= Russian destroyer Bespokoyny =

Bespokoyny is the name of the following ships in the Russian Navy:

- Russian destroyer Bespokoyny (1913), a Derzky-class destroyer, scrapped in the 1930s
- Russian destroyer Bespokoyny (1990), a Sovremenny-class destroyer, decommissioned in 2018, now a museum ship on Kotlin Island

== See also ==
- Soviet destroyer Bespokoyny
