= Soviet destroyer Bespokoyny =

Bespokoyny is the name of the following ships in the Soviet Navy:

- Soviet destroyer Bespokoyny (1951), a Skory-class destroyer, decommissioned in 1959 and sold to Indonesia, for whom it served until 1971
- Soviet destroyer Bespokoyny (1990), a Sovremenny-class destroyer, decommissioned in 2018, now a museum ship on Kotlin Island

== See also ==
- Russian destroyer Bespokoyny
