= Soviet destroyer Stoyky =

Stoyky is the name of the following ships in the Soviet Navy:

- Soviet destroyer Stoyky (1938), a Storozhevoy-class destroyer, sank during a storm in 1961
- Soviet destroyer Stoyky (1985), a Sovremenny-class destroyer, decommissioned in 1998
