= Chinese destroyer Fuzhou =

Type 956E destroyer of the People's Liberation Army Navy

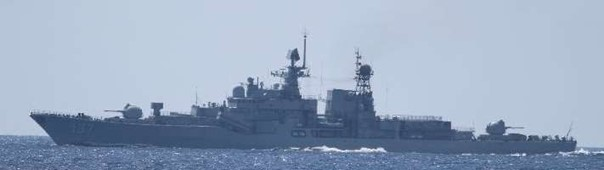
- Refitted and modernized Fuzhou underway in 2023

History

China
- Name: Fuzhou; (福州市)
- Namesake: Fuzhou; Vdumchivyy
- Builder: Severnaya Verf, Saint Petersburg
- Laid down: 22 April 1989
- Launched: 16 April 1999
- Commissioned: 20 November 2000
- Renamed: from Vdumchivyy; (Вдумчивый)
- Home port: Zhoushan
- Identification: Pennant number: 137
- Status: Active

General characteristics
- Class & type: Type 956E destroyer
- Displacement: 6,600 tons standard, 8,480 tons full load
- Length: 156 m (511 ft 10 in)
- Beam: 17.3 m (56 ft 9 in)
- Draught: 6.5 m (21 ft 4 in)
- Propulsion: 2 shaft steam turbines, 4 boilers, 75,000 kW (100,000 hp), 2 fixed propellers, 2 turbo generators, and 2 diesel generators
- Speed: 32.7 knots (60.6 km/h; 37.6 mph)
- Range: 3,920 nmi (7,260 km; 4,510 mi) at 18 knots (33 km/h; 21 mph); 1,345 nmi (2,491 km; 1,548 mi) at 33 knots (61 km/h; 38 mph)
- Complement: 350
- Sensors & processing systems: Radar: Air target acquisition radar, 3 × navigation radars, 130 mm gun fire-control radars, 30 mm air-defence gun fire control radar; Sonar: Active and passive under-keel sonar; ES: Tactical situation plotting board, anti-ship missile fire control system, air defence, missile fire-control system, and torpedo fire control system
- Electronic warfare & decoys: After modernization: 48 (2 × 24) H/RJZ-726-4A 24 barrel decoy dispenser; 72 (8 × 9) 9 barrel decoy dispenser; Replaced during modernization: 2 twin barrel PK-2 decoy dispensers (200 rocket decoys)
- Armament: After modernization: 2 dual AK-130 130 mm naval guns; 4 × 30 mm AK-630 gun-based CIWS (6 barreled rotary gun); 1 × HHQ-10 SAM-based CIWS (24-cell launcher); 8 (2 × 4) YJ-12 anti-ship missiles; 32 cell (2 x 16) vertical launching systems (VLS) for HQ-16 surface to air missiles (SAM) and Yu-8 anti-submarine missiles; 6 (2 × 3) 324 mm torpedo tubes; Weapens replaced during modernization: 8 (2 × 4) (SS-N-22 'Sunburn') anti-ship missiles; 2 single-arm launchers for 48 (2 × 24) SA-N-7 'Gadfly' (navalised Buk) surface-to-air missiles; 2 × 2 533 mm torpedo tubes; 2 × 6 RBU-1000 300 mm anti-submarine rocket launchers
- Aircraft carried: 1× Ka-27 series helicopter
- Aviation facilities: Helipad

Fuzhou (137) is a Type 956E destroyer of the People's Liberation Army Navy.

== Development and design ==
The project began in the late 1960s when it was becoming obvious to the Soviet Navy that naval guns still had an important role, particularly in support of amphibious landings, but existing gun cruisers and destroyers were showing their age. A new design was started, employing a new 130-millimetre (5.1 in) automatic gun turret.

The Type 956E destroyers were 156 metres (512 ft) in length, with a beam of 17.3 metres (56 ft 9 in) and a draught of 6.5 metres (21 ft 4 in).

The Chinese People's Liberation Army Navy Surface Force (PLAN) had two modified Sovremenny-class destroyers delivered in December 1999 and November 2000. In 2002, the PLAN ordered two improved versions designated 956-EM. The first vessel was launched in late 2005, while the second was launched in 2006. All four vessels were commissioned to the East Sea Fleet.

The project cost was 600 million US$ (mid-1990s price) for Project 956E (two ships), and 1.4 billion US$ (early-2000s price) for Project 956EM (two ships).

== Construction and career ==
Fuzhou was laid down on 22 April 1989 and launched on 16 April 1999 by Severnaya Verf in Saint Petersburg. She was commissioned on 20 November 2000.
