= Russian destroyer Bezuderzhny =

Sovremenny-class destroyer of the Russian Navy

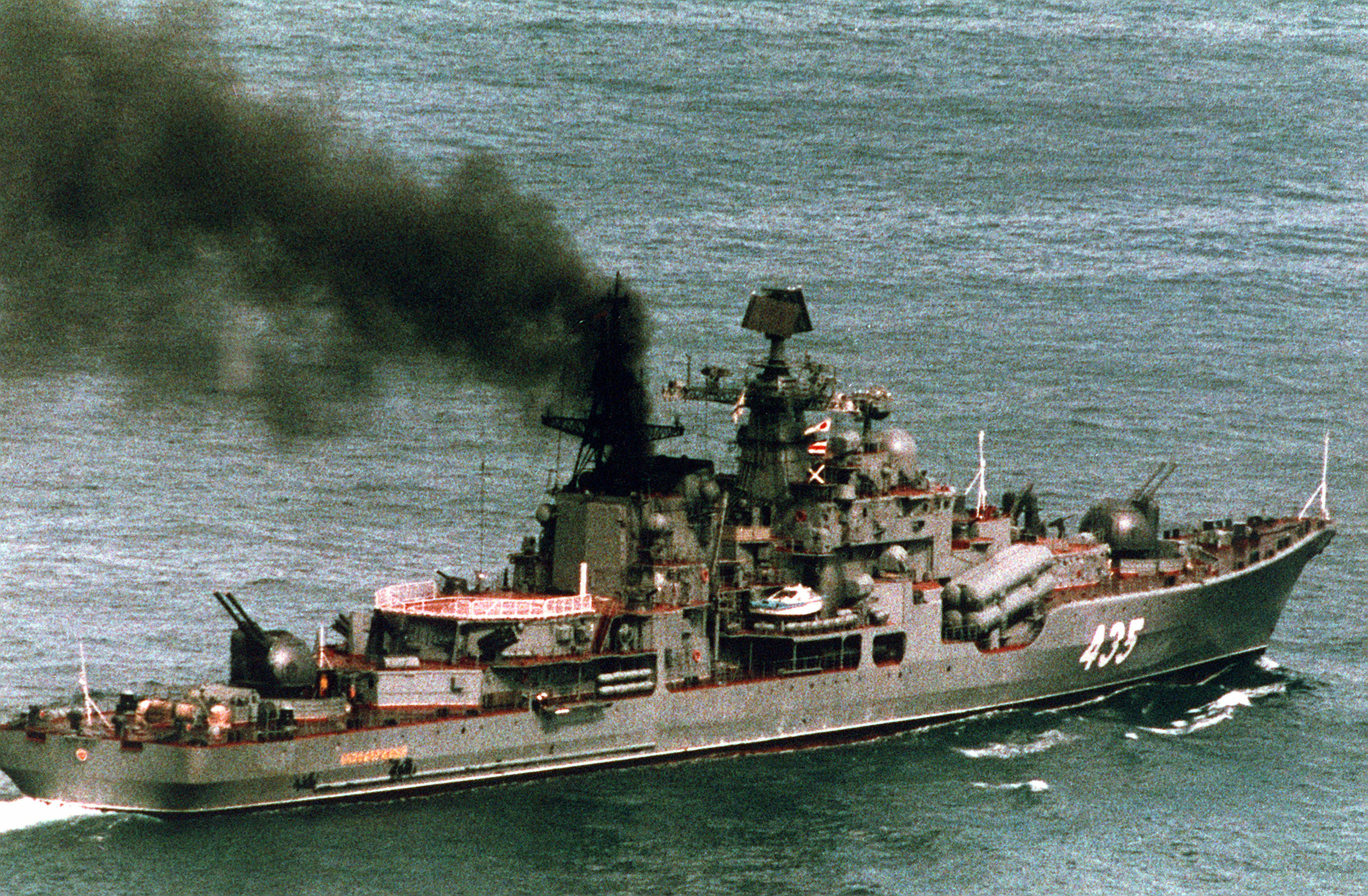
- Bezuderzhny underway on 1 June 1993

History

Soviet Union → Russia
- Name: Bezuderzhny; (Безудержный / Rampant)
- Builder: Severnaya Verf, Leningrad
- Laid down: 24 February 1987
- Launched: 30 September 1989
- Commissioned: 25 June 1991
- Decommissioned: 1 December 2012
- Renamed: Gremyashchy; (Гремящий / Thundering)
- Home port: Kaliningrad
- Identification: Pennant number: 406, 435, 444, 682
- Status: Undergoing scrap

General characteristics
- Class & type: Sovremenny-class destroyer
- Displacement: 6,600 tons standard, 8,480 tons full load
- Length: 156 m (511 ft 10 in)
- Beam: 17.3 m (56 ft 9 in)
- Draught: 6.5 m (21 ft 4 in)
- Propulsion: 2 shaft steam turbines, 4 boilers, 75,000 kW (100,000 hp), 2 fixed propellers, 2 turbo generators, and 2 diesel generators
- Speed: 32.7 knots (60.6 km/h; 37.6 mph)
- Range: 3,920 nmi (7,260 km; 4,510 mi) at 18 knots (33 km/h; 21 mph); 1,345 nmi (2,491 km; 1,548 mi) at 33 knots (61 km/h; 38 mph)
- Complement: 350
- Sensors & processing systems: Radar: Air target acquisition radar, 3 × navigation radars, 130 mm gun fire-control radars, 30 mm air-defence gun fire control radar; Sonar: Active and passive under-keel sonar; ES: Tactical situation plotting board, anti-ship missile fire control system, air defence, missile fire-control system, and torpedo fire control system
- Electronic warfare & decoys: 2 PK-2 decoy dispensers (200 rockets)
- Armament: Guns: 4 (2 × 2) AK-130 130 mm naval guns; 4 × 30 mm AK-630 CIWS; Missiles; 8 (2 × 4) (SS-N-22 'Sunburn') anti-ship missiles; 48 (2 × 24) SA-N-7 'Gadfly' surface-to-air missiles; Anti-submarine: 2 × 2 533 mm torpedo tubes; 2 × 6 RBU-1000 300 mm anti-submarine rocket launchers
- Aircraft carried: 1 × Ka-27 helicopter
- Aviation facilities: Helipad

Bezuderzhny was a Sovremenny-class destroyer of the Soviet and later Russian navy. She was renamed to Gremyashchy in 2007.

== Development and design ==
The project began in the late 1960s when it was becoming obvious to the Soviet Navy that naval guns still had an important role particularly in support of amphibious landings, but existing gun cruisers and destroyers were showing their age. A new design was started, employing a new 130 mm automatic gun turret.

The ships were 156 metres (512 ft) in length, with a beam of 17.3 metres (56 ft 9 in) and a draught of 6.5 metres (21 ft 4 in).

== Construction and career ==
Bezuderzhny was laid down on 24 February 1987 and launched on 30 September 1989 by Severnaya Verf in Leningrad. She was commissioned on 25 June 1991. Bezuderzhny made a guest appearance at New York City's fleet week 1993 along with the oiler Sheksna. Bezuderzhny had been the first Russian naval vessel to visit New York harbor since 1917.

In 1998 the ship was put into reserve awaiting repairs, having last gone to sea in 1997.

She was renamed to Gremyashchy in 2007.

She was finally decommissioned on 1 December 2012, and the naval flag was lowered on her.

In April 2016, the Russian Ministry of Defence officially requested bids for a contract for the scrapping of Gremyashchy along with seven other naval vessels.
