= Soviet destroyer Bezuprechny (1983) =

Sovremenny-class destroyer of the Soviet Navy

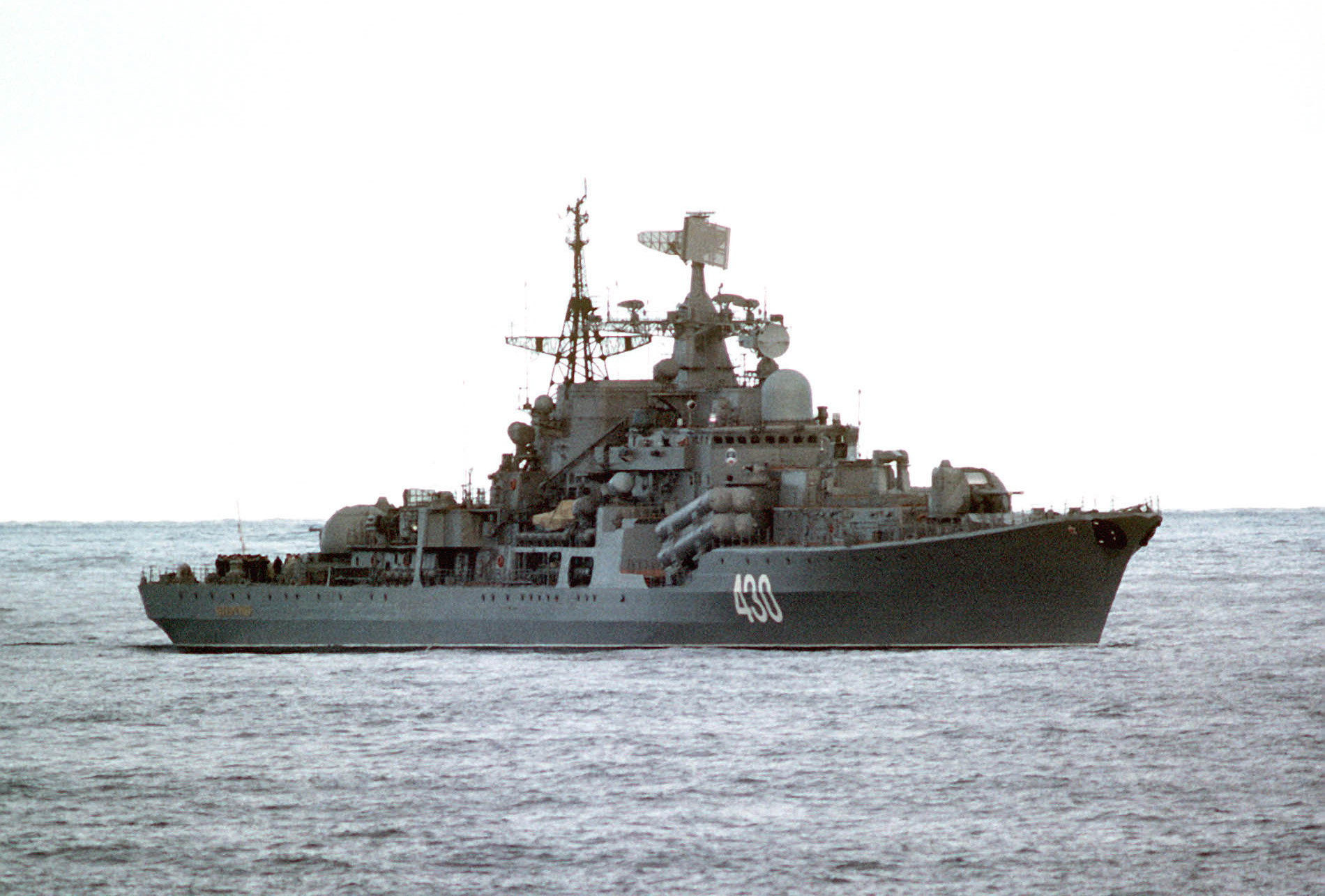
- Bezuprechny underway in August 1986

History

Soviet Union → Russia
- Name: Bezuprechny; (Безупречный)
- Namesake: Impeccable in Russian
- Builder: Zhdanov Shipyard, Leningrad
- Laid down: 29 January 1981
- Launched: 25 July 1983
- Commissioned: 6 November 1985
- Decommissioned: 4 August 1994
- Home port: Kaliningrad
- Identification: Pennant number: 413, 417, 430, 439, 455, 459, 681, 820
- Fate: Scrapped

General characteristics
- Class & type: Sovremenny-class destroyer
- Displacement: 6,600 tons standard, 8,480 tons full load
- Length: 156 m (511 ft 10 in)
- Beam: 17.3 m (56 ft 9 in)
- Draught: 6.5 m (21 ft 4 in)
- Propulsion: 2 shaft steam turbines, 4 boilers, 75,000 kW (100,000 hp), 2 fixed propellers, 2 turbo generators, and 2 diesel generators
- Speed: 32.7 knots (60.6 km/h; 37.6 mph)
- Range: 3,920 nmi (7,260 km; 4,510 mi) at 18 knots (33 km/h; 21 mph); 1,345 nmi (2,491 km; 1,548 mi) at 33 knots (61 km/h; 38 mph)
- Complement: 350
- Sensors & processing systems: Radar: Air target acquisition radar, 3 × navigation radars, 130 mm gun fire-control radars, 30 mm air-defence gun fire control radar; Sonar: Active and passive under-keel sonar; ES: Tactical situation plotting board, anti-ship missile fire control system, air defence, missile fire-control system, and torpedo fire control system
- Electronic warfare & decoys: 2 PK-2 decoy dispensers (200 rockets)
- Armament: Guns: 2 × twin AK-130 130 mm (5 in) naval guns; 4 × 30 mm (1.2 in) AK-630 CIWS; Missiles; 2 × quad (SS-N-22 'Sunburn') anti-ship missiles; 2 × 24 SA-N-7 'Gadfly' surface-to-air missiles; Anti-submarine: 2 × twin 533 mm (21 in) torpedo tubes; 2 × 6 RBU-1000 300 mm (12 in) anti-submarine rocket launchers
- Aircraft carried: 1× Ka-27 helicopter
- Aviation facilities: Helipad

Bezuprechny was a Sovremenny-class destroyer of the Soviet and later Russian navy.

== Development and design ==
The project began in the late 1960s when it was becoming obvious to the Soviet Navy that naval guns still had an important role particularly in support of amphibious landings, but existing gun cruisers and destroyers were showing their age. A new design was started, employing a new 130-millimetre (5 in) automatic gun turret.

The Sovremenny-class ships are 156 metres (512 ft) in length, with a beam of 17.3 metres (56 ft 9 in) and a draught of 6.5 metres (21 ft 4 in).

== Construction and career ==
Bezuprechny was laid down on 29 January 1981 and launched on 25 July 1983 by Zhdanov Shipyard in Leningrad. She was commissioned on 6 November 1985.

From 5 January 1987, alongside the aircraft carrier Kiev and the cruiser Admiral Isachenkov, she saw service in the Mediterranean Sea, tracking the aircraft carrier USS Nimitz. From 2 to 5 June, Bezuprechny visited the port of Tripoli in Libya. On 23 June 1987, the destroyer returned to Severomorsk, having covered 20,197 nautical miles (37,405 km; 23,242 mi) in 168 sailing days.

From 4 to 17 March 1989, together with the destroyer Okrylyonny, she shadowed the NATO exercise Nord Star and monitored the aircraft carrier USS America.

On 26 May 1993, Bezuprechny represented the Soviet Union, at the British and Allied Fleets Review, at Moelfre Anchorage off Anglesey, in commemoration of the 50th anniversary of the turning point in the World War II Battle of the Atlantic, in presence of HRH the Duke of Edinburgh, who reviewed the assembled fleets in HMY Britannia, in terrible weather conditions. Subsequently, Bezuprechny visited Liverpool, along with all the other Allied ships.

On 4 August 1994, by order of the Northern Fleet (No. 02868), Bezuprechny was put into reserve. Commencing on 3 November 1994, the vessel underwent repairs and modernization at Severnaya Verf. Due to a lack of funding, the destroyer was later designated for decommissioning.

== Gallery ==
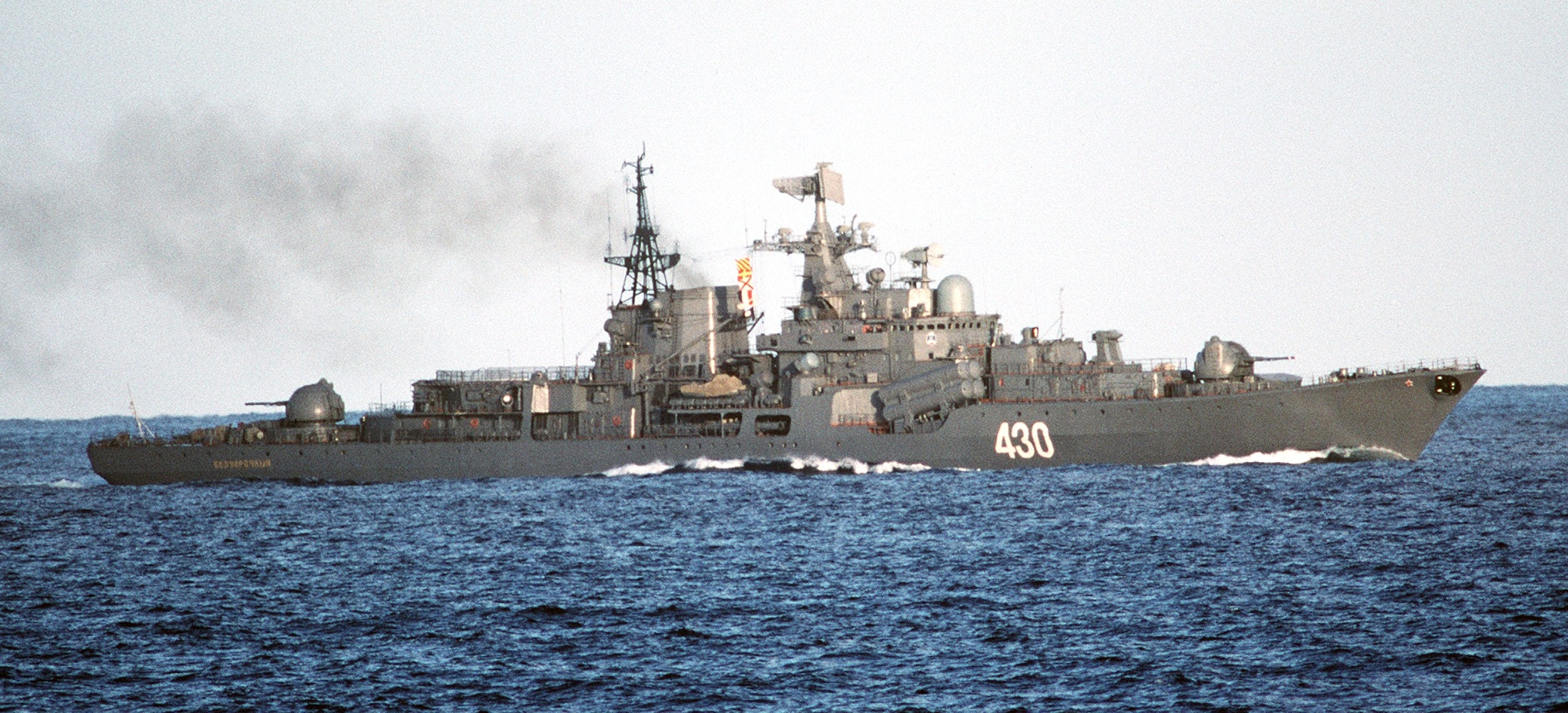
Bezuprechny underway in August 1986

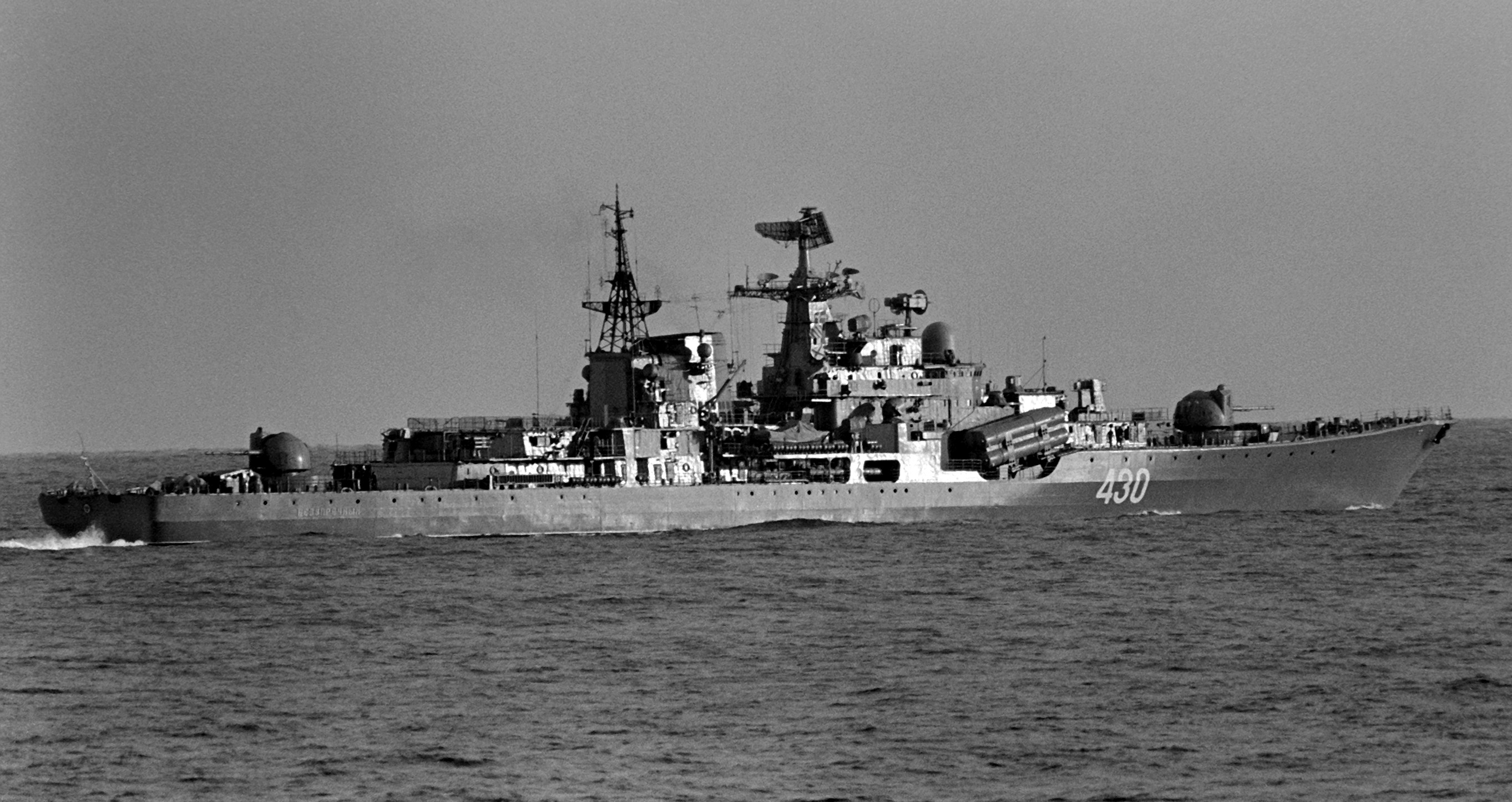
Bezuprechny underway on 30 August 1986
