= Russian destroyer Burny =

Sovremenny-class destroyer of the Russian Navy

Coordinates: 43.1107416°N 131.9079957°E

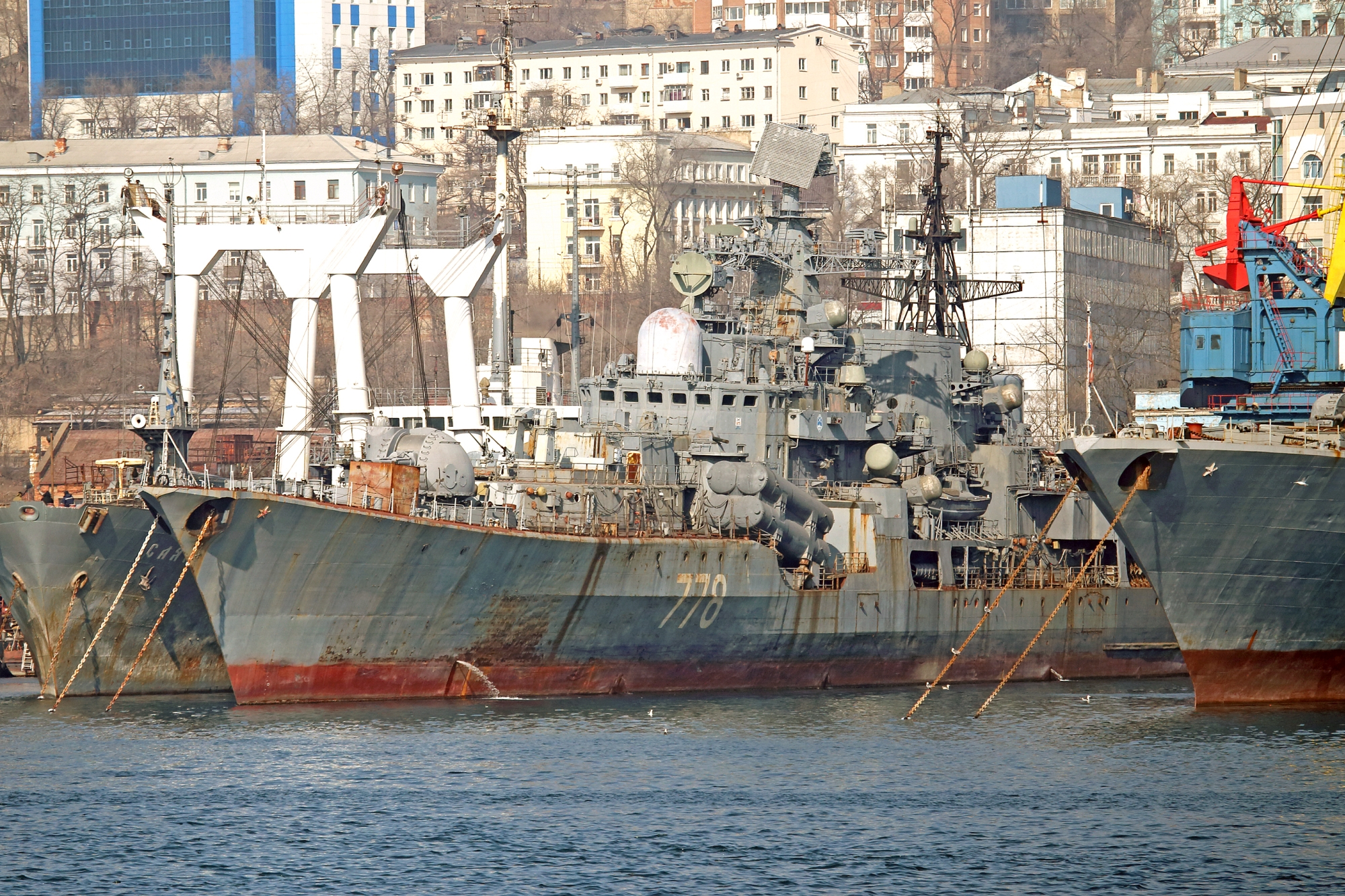
- Burny on 5 February 2015

History

Soviet Union → Russia
- Name: Burny; (Бурный)
- Namesake: Impetuous in Russian
- Builder: Zhdanov Shipyard, Leningrad
- Laid down: 4 November 1983
- Launched: 30 December 1986
- Commissioned: 30 September 1988
- Decommissioned: 2019
- Home port: Vladivostok
- Identification: Pennant number: 677, 778, 795
- Status: Decommissioned in 2019, Laid up awaiting disposal

General characteristics
- Class & type: Sovremenny-class destroyer
- Displacement: 6,600 tons standard, 8,480 tons full load
- Length: 156 m (511 ft 10 in)
- Beam: 17.3 m (56 ft 9 in)
- Draught: 6.5 m (21 ft 4 in)
- Propulsion: 2 shaft steam turbines, 4 boilers, 75,000 kW (100,000 hp), 2 fixed propellers, 2 turbo generators, and 2 diesel generators
- Speed: 32.7 knots (60.6 km/h; 37.6 mph)
- Range: 3,920 nmi (7,260 km; 4,510 mi) at 18 knots (33 km/h; 21 mph); 1,345 nmi (2,491 km; 1,548 mi) at 33 knots (61 km/h; 38 mph)
- Complement: 350
- Sensors & processing systems: Radar: Air target acquisition radar, 3 × navigation radars, 130 mm gun fire-control radars, 30 mm air-defence gun fire control radar; Sonar: Active and passive under-keel sonar; ES: Tactical situation plotting board, anti-ship missile fire control system, air defence, missile fire-control system, and torpedo fire control system
- Electronic warfare & decoys: 2 PK-2 decoy dispensers (200 rockets)
- Armament: Guns: 4 (2 × 2) AK-130 130 mm naval guns; 4 × 30 mm AK-630 CIWS; Missiles; 8 (2 × 4) (SS-N-22 'Sunburn') anti-ship missiles; 48 (2 × 24) SA-N-7 'Gadfly' surface-to-air missiles; Anti-submarine: 2 × 2 533 mm torpedo tubes; 2 × 6 RBU-1000 300 mm anti-submarine rocket launchers
- Aircraft carried: 1× Ka-27 series helicopter
- Aviation facilities: Helipad

Burny is a Sovremenny-class destroyer of the Soviet and later Russian navy.

== Development and design ==
The project began in the late 1960s when it was becoming obvious in the Soviet Navy that naval guns still had an important role particularly in support of amphibious landings, but existing gun Cruisers and destroyers were showing their age. A new design was started, employing a new 130 mm automatic gun turret.

The ships were 156 metres (512 ft) in length, with a beam of 17.3 metres (56 ft 9 in) and a draught of 6.5 metres (21 ft 4 in).

== Construction and career ==
Burny was laid down on 4 November 1983 and launched on 30 December 1983 by Zhdanov Shipyard in Leningrad.

From October 14 to November 14, 1990, the destroyer underwent dock repairs at Dalzavod in PD-77. In 1990, Burny covered 5738 miles.

From January 3 to July 20, 1991, the ship carried out combat service in the South China Sea, based in Cam Ranh, during its combat service it covered 6554.5 nautical miles. In total, in 1991, the ship covered 8222.3 miles.

On April 28, 1994, the destroyer was assigned to the 36th division of missile ships of the 10th operational squadron. During 1996, the ship covered 1125 miles in 27 sailing days.

In August 1998 it took part in the Russian-American emergency response exercises.

From April 19 to April 23, 1999, she took part in the collection-cruise of the Pacific Fleet with the launch of missiles. In June 1999, the ship was sent for repairs to Dalzavod. On September 26, 1999, under the flag of Vice-Admiral M. G. Zakharenko, the ship together with the cruiser Varyag made an exit to the sea; in October, during the celebration of the 50th anniversary of the PRC, it paid a visit to Shanghai; returned to base on October 10.

On April 10, 2000, at 10 o'clock in the morning, an unauthorized salvo from an AK-630 was fired on the ship while turning around at the side of the destroyer Admiral Vinogradov. In this regard, the planned visit to Busan on April 12 was postponed until autumn.

In 2005, the ship participated in the joint Russian-Chinese exercise Peace Mission 2005. In the same year, the ship was delivered for repairs at the Dalzavod.

According to the executive director of the enterprise, work on the ship began only in September 2007.

In February 2013, the St. Petersburg Kirov-Energomash plant started repairing Burny, but this type of repair proved difficult, since the plant had already ceased production of turbine blades, and no specialists remained. On October 24, 2013, the management of the Dalzavod CS announced the repair of the ship's electromechanical installation.

In the beginning of the modernization of weapons in 2014, after receiving a technical assignment from the command of the Navy.

It is known that until the end of 2015 the Kirov-Energomash plant did not perform the necessary repairs of the GTZA.

In 2016, a decision was made to continue the renovation.

While in 2019 it was reported that funds had been found to continue renovation work on the destroyer, as of 2025 the ship had been out of service for about 20 years and was laid up in Fokino Bay.

== Gallery ==
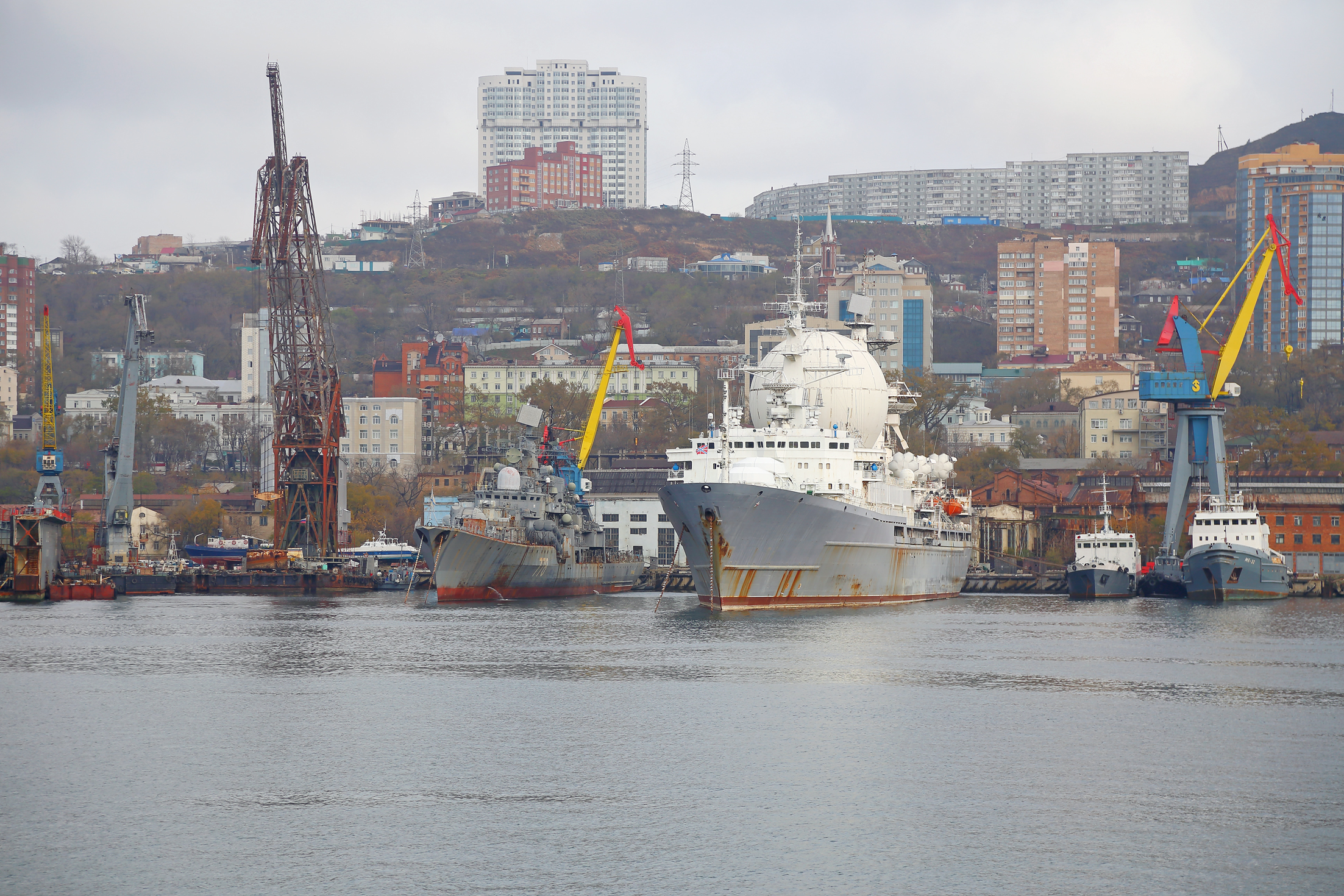
Burny undergoing overhaul on 24 October 2014.

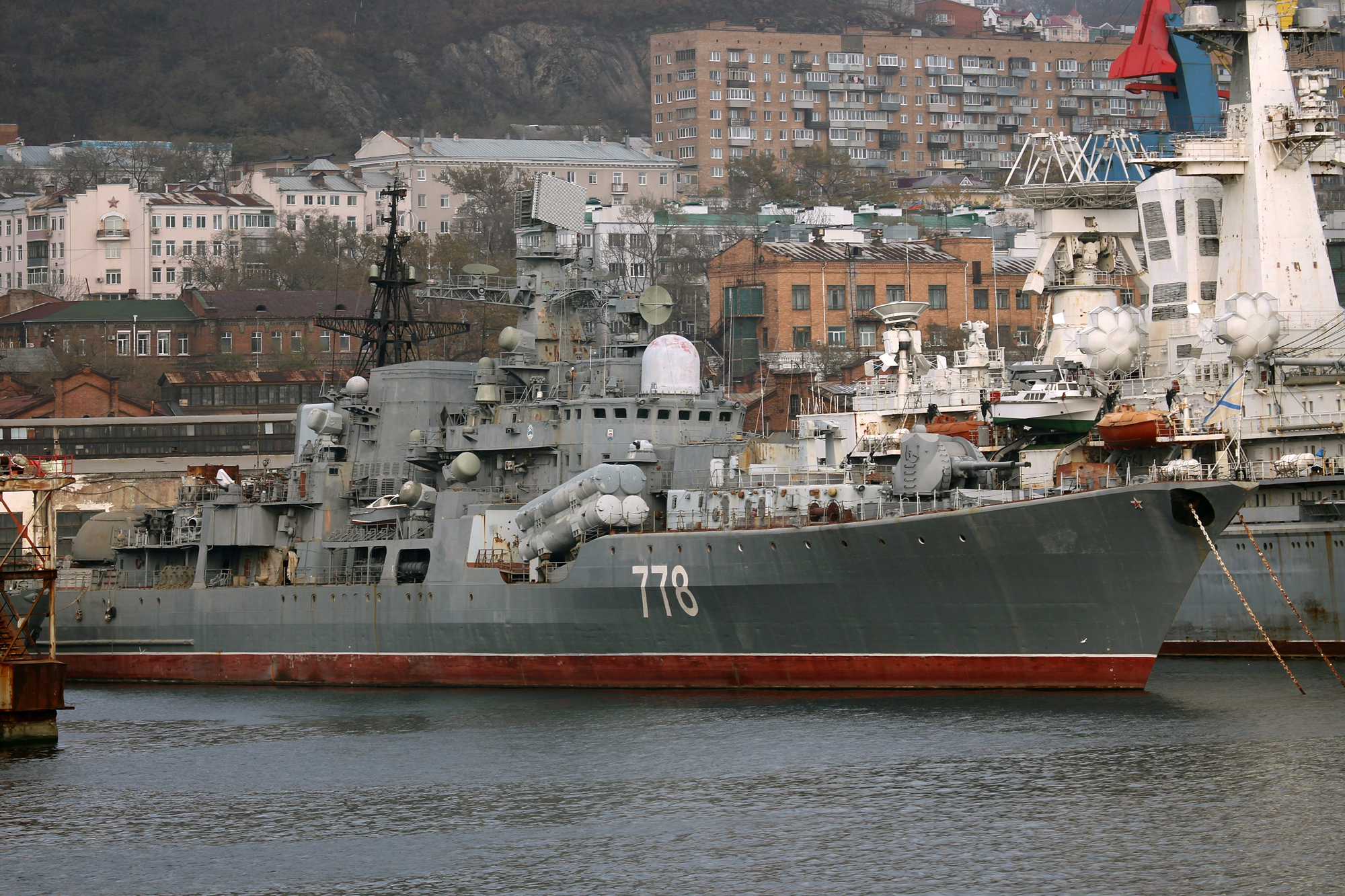
Burny undergoing overhaul on 24 October 2014.

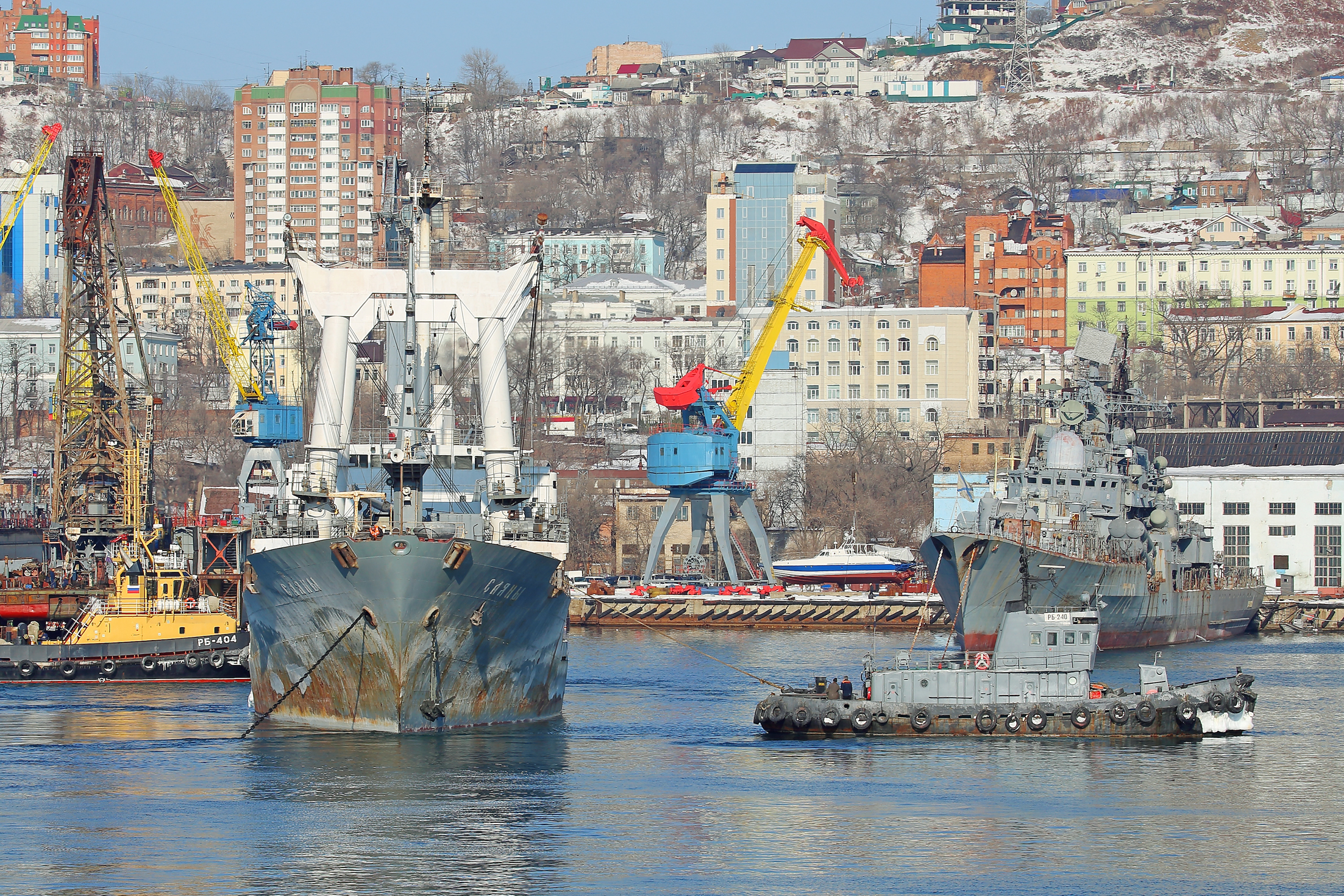
Burny undergoing overhaul on 24 October 2014.

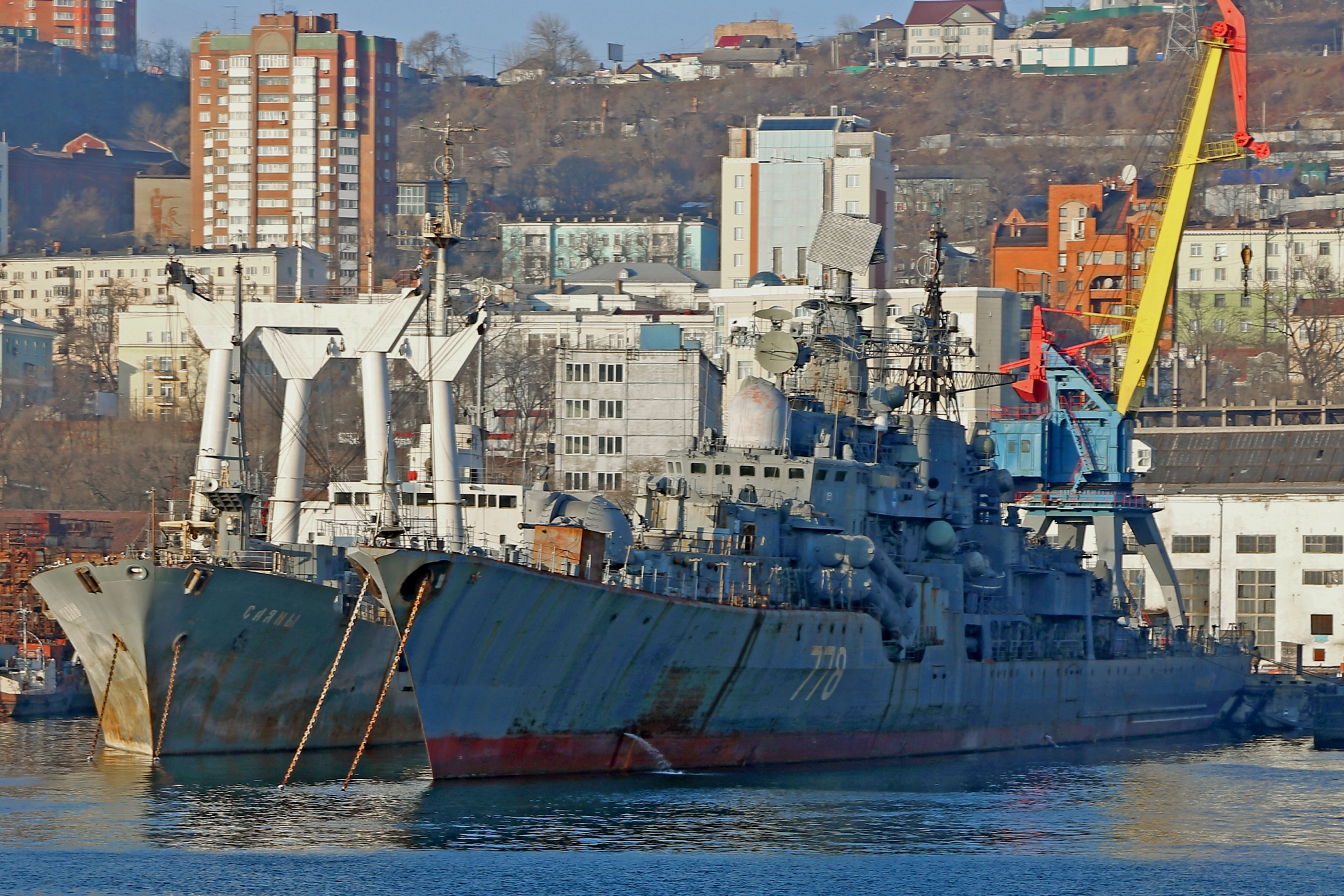
Burny undergoing overhaul on 5 February 2015.
