= Soviet destroyer Osmotritelny =

Sovremenny-class destroyer of the Soviet Navy

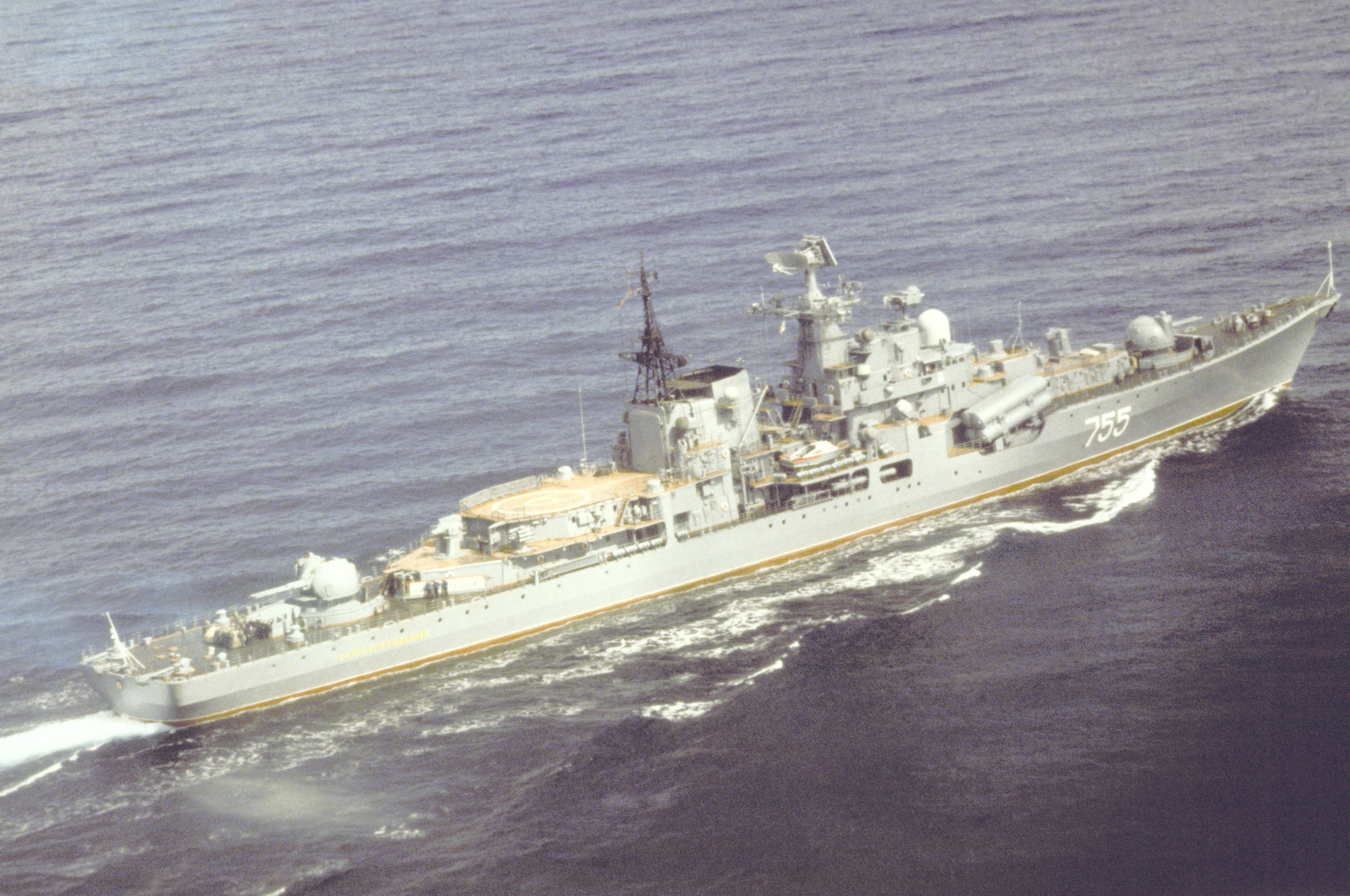
- Osmotritelny underway on 1 May 1989

History

Soviet Union → Russia
- Name: Osmotritelny; (Осмотрительный)
- Namesake: Circumspect in Russian
- Builder: Zhdanov Shipyard, Leningrad
- Laid down: 27 October 1978
- Launched: 24 April 1982
- Commissioned: 30 September 1984
- Decommissioned: 16 August 1997
- Home port: Vladivostok
- Identification: Pennant number: 672, 730, 735, 755, 780
- Fate: Scrapped

General characteristics
- Class & type: Sovremenny-class destroyer
- Displacement: 6,600 tons standard, 8,480 tons full load
- Length: 156 m (511 ft 10 in)
- Beam: 17.3 m (56 ft 9 in)
- Draught: 6.5 m (21 ft 4 in)
- Propulsion: 2 shaft steam turbines, 4 boilers, 75,000 kW (100,000 hp), 2 fixed propellers, 2 turbo generators, and 2 diesel generators
- Speed: 32.7 knots (60.6 km/h; 37.6 mph)
- Range: 3,920 nmi (7,260 km; 4,510 mi) at 18 knots (33 km/h; 21 mph); 1,345 nmi (2,491 km; 1,548 mi) at 33 knots (61 km/h; 38 mph)
- Complement: 350
- Sensors & processing systems: Radar: Air target acquisition radar, 3 × navigation radars, 130 mm gun fire-control radars, 30 mm air-defence gun fire control radar; Sonar: Active and passive under-keel sonar; ES: Tactical situation plotting board, anti-ship missile fire control system, air defence, missile fire-control system, and torpedo fire control system
- Electronic warfare & decoys: 2 PK-2 decoy dispensers (200 rockets)
- Armament: Guns: 4 (2 × 2) AK-130 130 mm naval guns; 4 × 30 mm AK-630 CIWS; Missiles; 8 (2 × 4) (SS-N-22 'Sunburn') anti-ship missiles; 48 (2 × 24) SA-N-7 'Gadfly' surface-to-air missiles; Anti-submarine: 2 × 2 533 mm torpedo tubes; 2 × 6 RBU-1000 300 mm anti-submarine rocket launchers
- Aircraft carried: 1× Ka-27 series helicopter
- Aviation facilities: Helipad

Osmotritelny was a Sovremenny-class destroyer of the Soviet and later Russian navy.

== Development and design ==
The project began in the late 1960s when it was becoming obvious to the Soviet Navy that naval guns still had an important role particularly in support of amphibious landings, but existing gun cruisers and destroyers were showing their age. A new design was started, employing a new 130 mm automatic gun turret.

The ships were 156 metres (512 ft) in length, with a beam of 17.3 metres (56 ft 9 in) and a draught of 6.5 metres (21 ft 4 in).

== Construction and career ==
Osmotritelny was laid down on 22 April 1978 and launched on 21 March 1981 by Zhdanov Shipyard in Leningrad. She was commissioned on 30 September 1983.

On 14 August 1991 she was delivered for repairs to Dalzavod, part of the 79th Brigade of Ships under construction and being repaired, but almost no repairs were carried out.

As a result, on 16 August 1997, the ship was excluded from the lists of the fleet.

On 18 July 1998 she was taken to Strelok Bay for dismantling.
