= Soviet destroyer Otlichny =

Sovremenny-class destroyer of the Soviet Navy

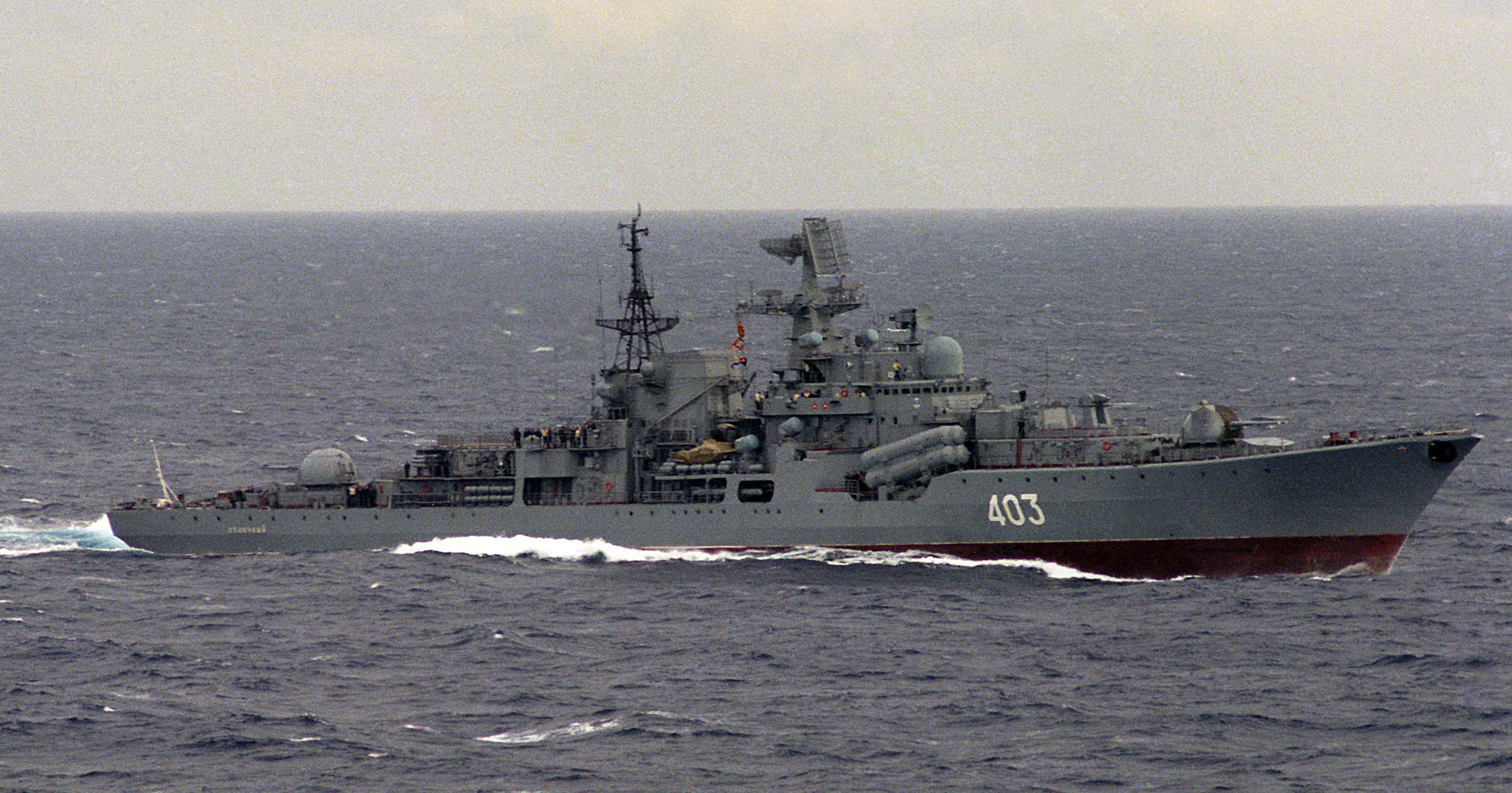
- Otlichny underway on 24 March 1986

History

Soviet Union → Russia
- Name: Otlichny; (Отличный)
- Namesake: Excellent in Russian
- Builder: Zhdanov Shipyard, Leningrad
- Laid down: 22 April 1978
- Launched: 21 March 1981
- Commissioned: 30 September 1983
- Decommissioned: 22 November 1998
- Stricken: 30 December 1998
- Home port: Kaliningrad
- Identification: Pennant number: 151, 403, 434, 474, 671
- Fate: Scrapped

General characteristics
- Class & type: Sovremenny-class destroyer
- Displacement: 6,600 tons standard, 8,480 tons full load
- Length: 156 m (511 ft 10 in)
- Beam: 17.3 m (56 ft 9 in)
- Draught: 6.5 m (21 ft 4 in)
- Propulsion: 2 shaft steam turbines, 4 boilers, 75,000 kW (100,000 hp), 2 fixed propellers, 2 turbo generators, and 2 diesel generators
- Speed: 32.7 knots (60.6 km/h; 37.6 mph)
- Range: 3,920 nmi (7,260 km; 4,510 mi) at 18 knots (33 km/h; 21 mph); 1,345 nmi (2,491 km; 1,548 mi) at 33 knots (61 km/h; 38 mph)
- Complement: 350
- Sensors & processing systems: Radar: Air target acquisition radar, 3 × navigation radars, 130 mm gun fire-control radars, 30 mm air-defence gun fire control radar; Sonar: Active and passive under-keel sonar; ES: Tactical situation plotting board, anti-ship missile fire control system, air defence, missile fire-control system, and torpedo fire control system
- Electronic warfare & decoys: 2 PK-2 decoy dispensers (200 rockets)
- Armament: Guns: 4 (2 × 2) AK-130 130 mm naval guns; 4 × 30 mm AK-630 CIWS; Missiles; 8 (2 × 4) (SS-N-22 'Sunburn') anti-ship missiles; 48 (2 × 24) SA-N-7 'Gadfly' surface-to-air missiles; Anti-submarine: 2 × 2 533 mm torpedo tubes; 2 × 6 RBU-1000 300 mm anti-submarine rocket launchers
- Aircraft carried: 1× Ka-27 series helicopter
- Aviation facilities: Helipad

Otlichny was a Sovremenny-class destroyer of the Soviet and later Russian navy.

== Development and design ==
The project began in the late 1960s when it was becoming obvious to the Soviet Navy that naval guns still had an important role particularly in support of amphibious landings, but existing gun cruisers and destroyers were showing their age. A new design was started, employing a new 130 mm automatic gun turret.

The ships were 156 metres (512 ft) in length, with a beam of 17.3 metres (56 ft 9 in) and a draught of 6.5 metres (21 ft 4 in).

== Construction and career ==
Otlichny was laid down on 22 April 1978 and launched on 21 March 1981 by Zhdanov Shipyard in Leningrad. She was commissioned on 30 September 1983.

On 1 October 1991 she was transferred to the 43rd Division of Missile Ships (43 DRK) of the 7th Operational Squadron (7 OPSK), was preparing to go to Sevastopol for repairs, but was transferred to the reserve of the 1st category.

In August 1993, she was preparing for repairs in Leningrad, from 4 January 1994 he was preparing for repairs in Murmansk, but did not go anywhere and was put into the 2nd category reserve.

On 20 November 1994 she returned to the 56 Bram lineup.

Excluded from the lists of the fleet on 22 November 1998 the flag was lowered on the ship. Disbanded on 30 December 1998.

== Gallery ==
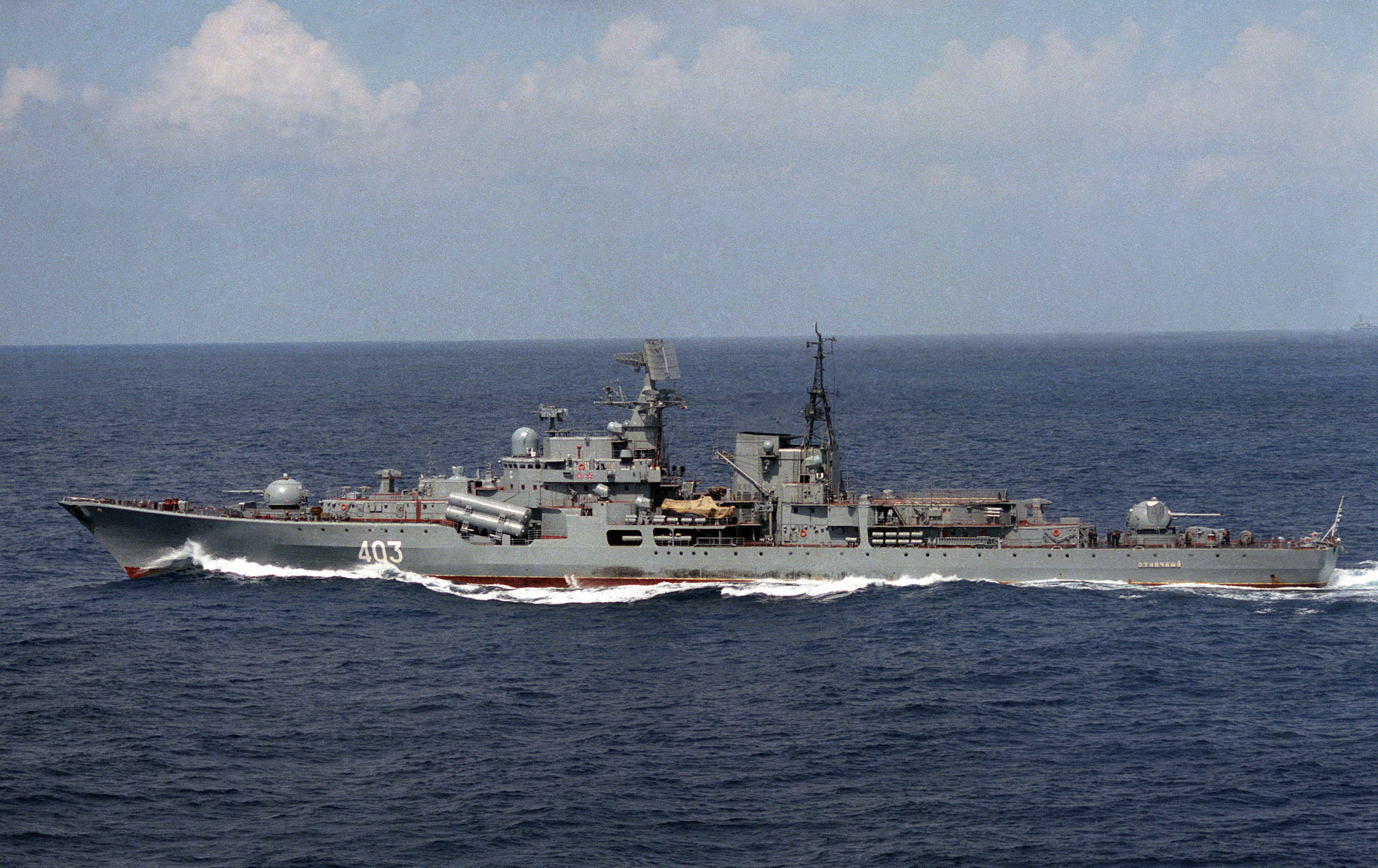
Otlichny underway off Libya on 24 March 1986.

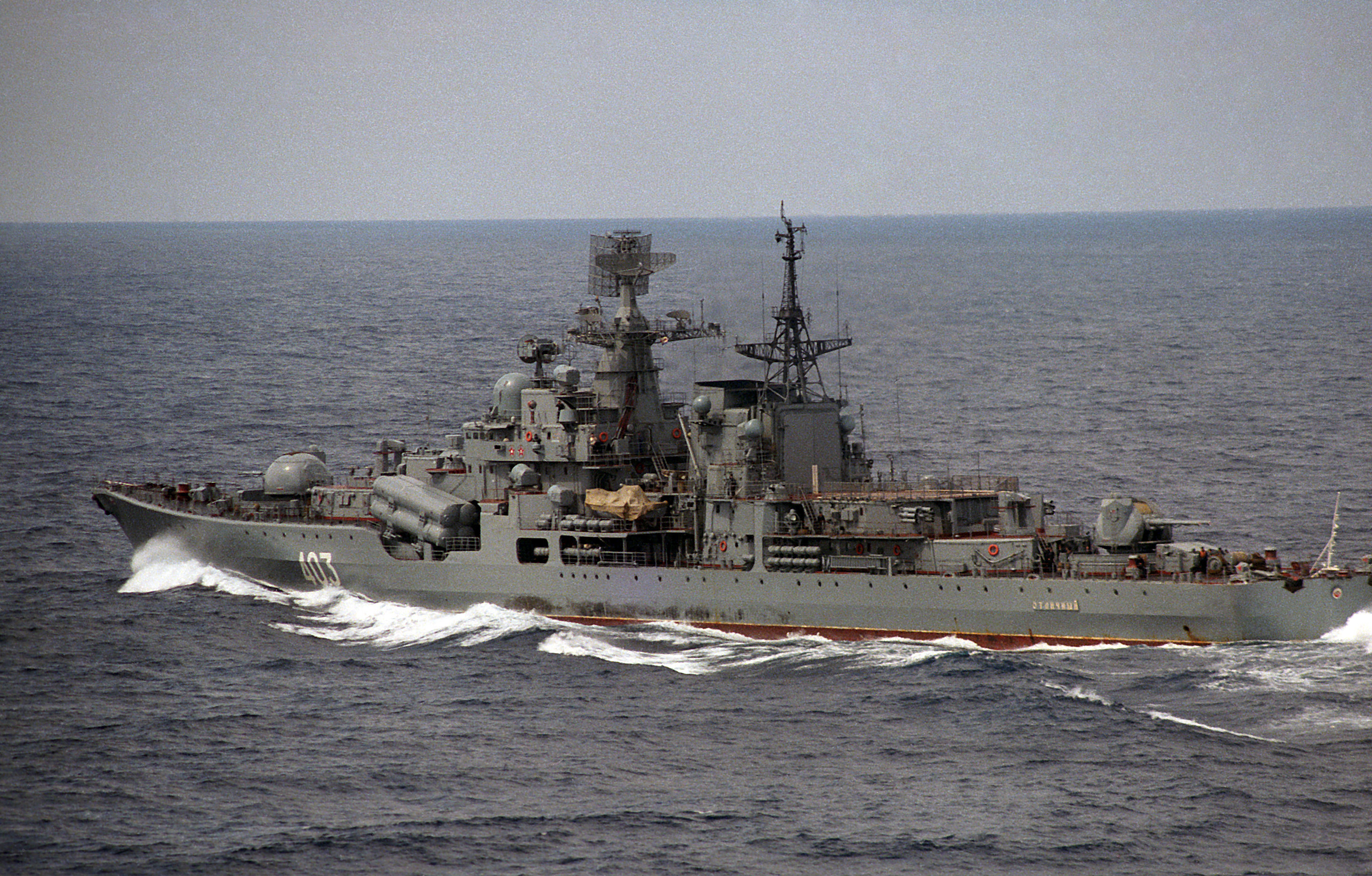
Otlichny underway off Libya on 24 March 1986.

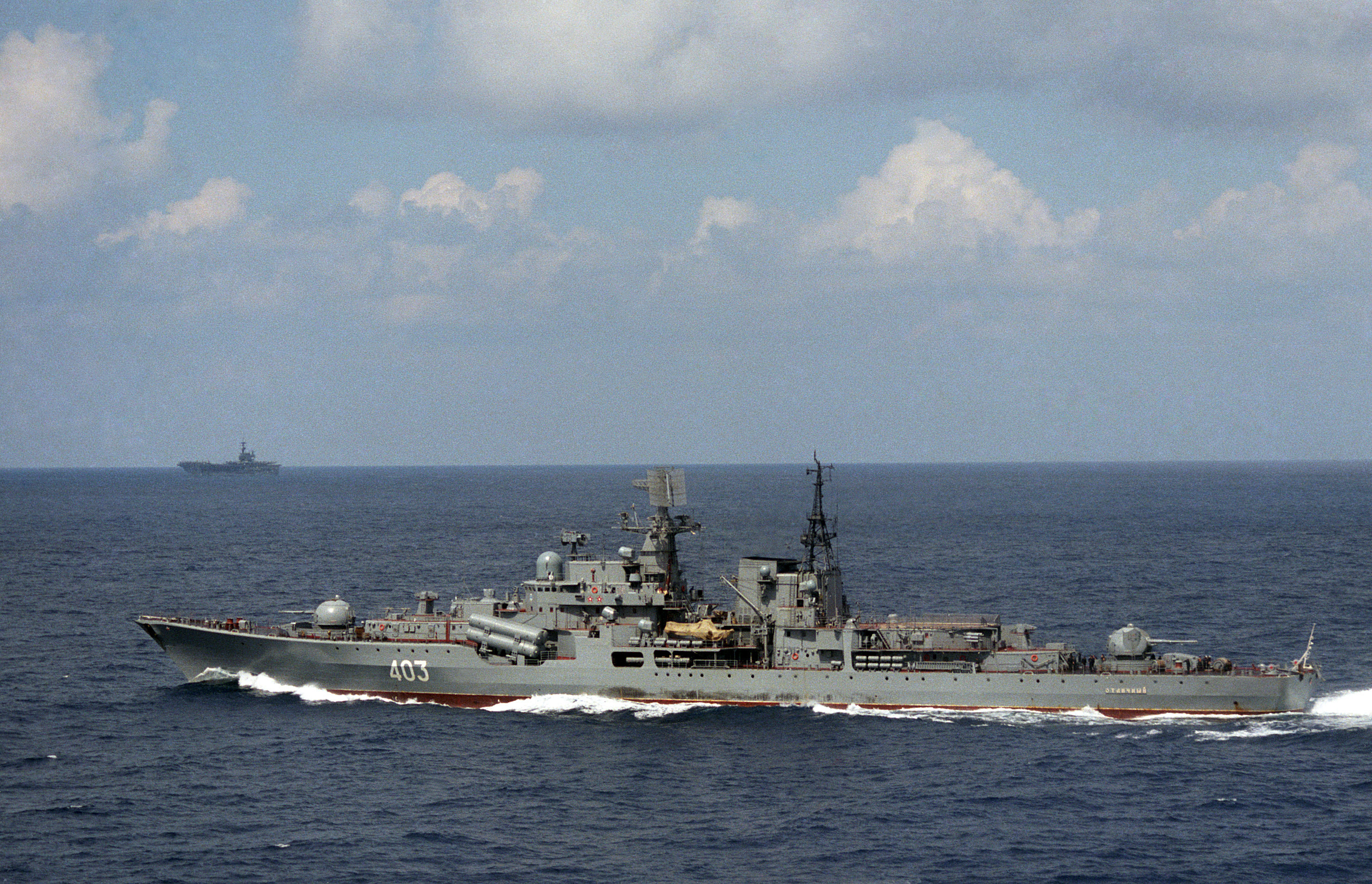
Otlichny underway off Libya on 24 March 1986.

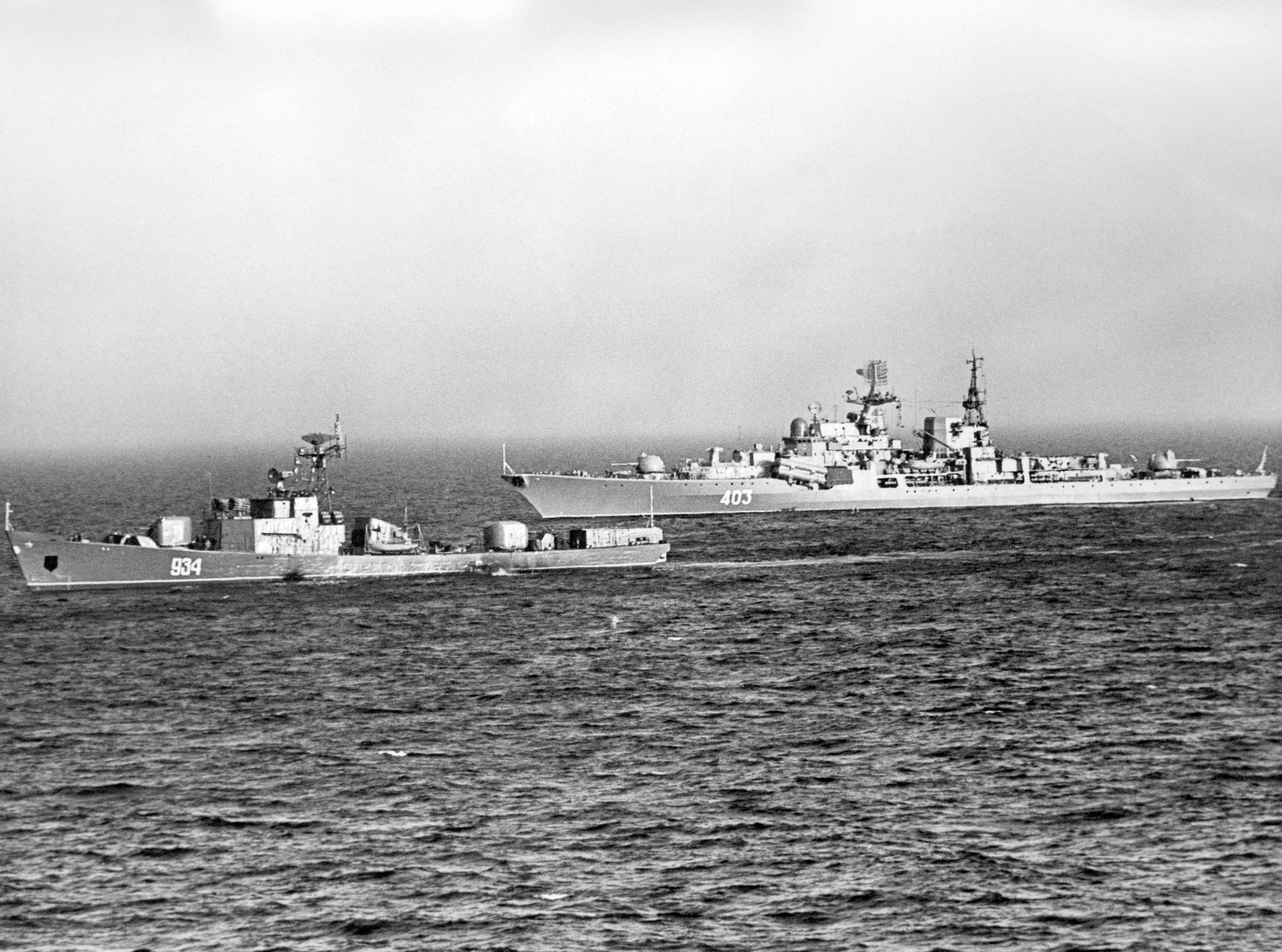
Otlichny underway on 29 April 1986.
