= Soviet destroyer Stoyky (1985) =

Sovremenny-class destroyer of the Soviet & Russian Navy

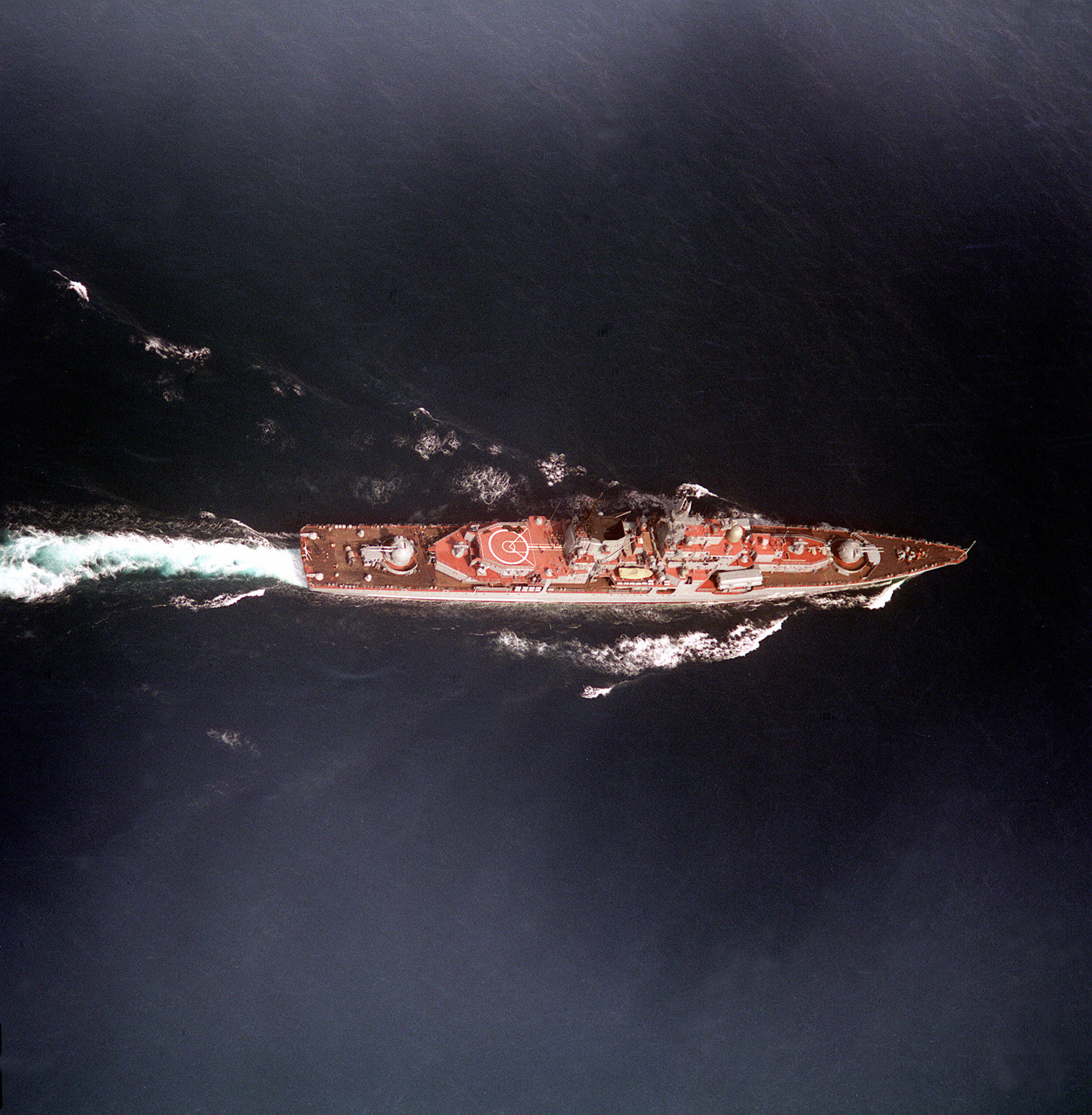
- Stoyky underway on 1 January 1987

History

Soviet Union → Russia
- Name: Stoyky; (Стойкий)
- Namesake: Steadfast in Russian
- Builder: Zhdanov Shipyard, Leningrad
- Laid down: 28 September 1982
- Launched: 27 July 1985
- Commissioned: 24 February 1987
- Decommissioned: 30 May 1998
- Home port: Vladivostok
- Identification: Pennant number: 645, 679, 719, 727, 743
- Fate: Scrapped

General characteristics
- Class & type: Sovremenny-class destroyer
- Displacement: 6,600 tons standard, 8,480 tons full load
- Length: 156 m (511 ft 10 in)
- Beam: 17.3 m (56 ft 9 in)
- Draught: 6.5 m (21 ft 4 in)
- Propulsion: 2 shaft steam turbines, 4 boilers, 75,000 kW (100,000 hp), 2 fixed propellers, 2 turbo generators, and 2 diesel generators
- Speed: 32.7 knots (60.6 km/h; 37.6 mph)
- Range: 3,920 nmi (7,260 km; 4,510 mi) at 18 knots (33 km/h; 21 mph); 1,345 nmi (2,491 km; 1,548 mi) at 33 knots (61 km/h; 38 mph)
- Complement: 350
- Sensors & processing systems: Radar: Air target acquisition radar, 3 × navigation radars, 130 mm gun fire-control radars, 30 mm air-defence gun fire control radar; Sonar: Active and passive under-keel sonar; ES: Tactical situation plotting board, anti-ship missile fire control system, air defence, missile fire-control system, and torpedo fire control system
- Electronic warfare & decoys: 2 PK-2 decoy dispensers (200 rockets)
- Armament: Guns: 2 × twin AK-130 130 mm (5 in) naval guns; 4 × 30 mm (1.2 in) AK-630 CIWS; Missiles; 2 × quad (SS-N-22 'Sunburn') anti-ship missiles; 2 × 24 SA-N-7 'Gadfly' surface-to-air missiles; Anti-submarine: 2 × twin 533 mm (21 in) torpedo tubes; 2 × 6 RBU-1000 300 mm (12 in) anti-submarine rocket launchers
- Aircraft carried: 1× Ka-27 helicopter
- Aviation facilities: Helipad

Stoyky was a Sovremenny-class destroyer of the Soviet and later Russian navy.

== Development and design ==
The project began in the late 1960s when it was becoming obvious in the Soviet Navy that naval guns still had an important role particularly in support of amphibious landings, but existing gun cruisers and destroyers were showing their age. A new design was started, employing a new 130-millimetre (5 in) automatic gun turret.

The Sovremenny-class ships were 156 metres (512 ft) in length, with a beam of 17.3 metres (56 ft 9 in) and a draught of 6.5 metres (21 ft 4 in).

== Construction and career ==
Stoyky was laid down on 28 September 1982 and launched on 27 July 1985 by Zhdanov Shipyard in Leningrad. She was commissioned on 24 February 1987.

From October 1 to October 19, 1988, the USSR Ministry of Defense inspected the ship and assessed its condition as unsatisfactory.

In 1989, the destroyer underwent repairs. The repeat of the firing test carried out in November 1989 was rated as excellent.

On January 15, 1990, she entered combat service in the South China Sea, crossed the Indian Ocean and was on combat duty in the Gulf of Oman. In July 1990, she returned to Vladivostok for repairs.

On April 1, 1991, Stoyky was transferred to the 193rd Brigade of anti-submarine ships of the Soviet-Gavan naval base.

From March 20, 1992, the ship was assigned for repairs at SRZ-178, but the repair was not carried out.

On October 22, 1993, the ship was transferred to Dalzavod.

On April 28, 1994, the destroyer was transferred to the 36th division of missile ships 10 OPESK.

In September 1996, the repairs were stopped, and on September 14, the Stoyky was towed to Strelok Bay for mothballing.

On May 30, 1998, by order of the Ministry of Defense No. 034, the ship was excluded from the Russian Navy.

On April 6, 1999, Stoyky tilted to the port side at pier No. 1 due to the plundering of outboard fittings. Later the ship was raised.

She was sold to China for scrap in 2001.
