= Russian destroyer Bespokoyny (1990) =

Sovremenny-class destroyer of the Russian Navy

Coordinates: 59.9838108°N 29.7609141°E

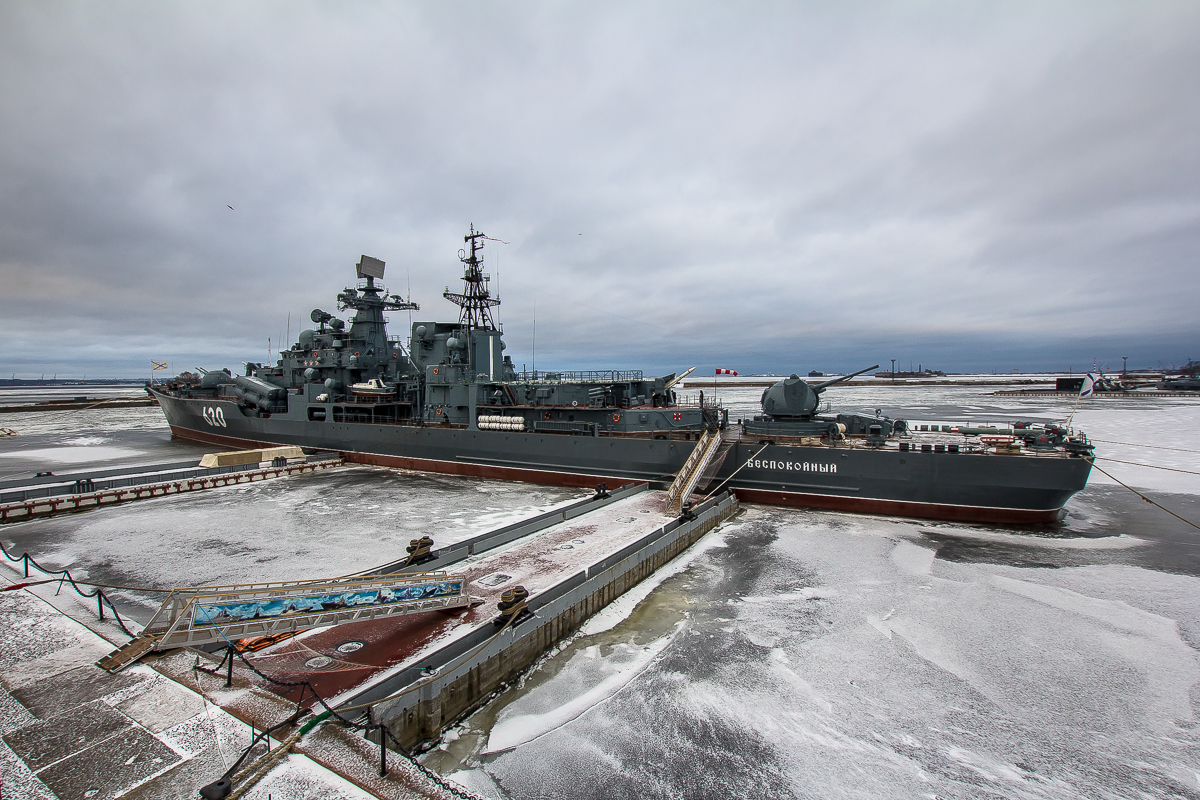
- Bespokoyny on 8 December 2018

History

Soviet Union → Russia
- Name: Bespokoyny; (Беспокойный)
- Namesake: Restless in Russian
- Builder: Severnaya Verf, Leningrad
- Laid down: 18 April 1987
- Launched: 9 June 1990
- Commissioned: 28 December 1991
- Decommissioned: 2018
- Home port: Kaliningrad
- Identification: Pennant number: 620, 678
- Status: Museum ship at Kotlin Island, Russia

General characteristics
- Class & type: Sovremenny-class destroyer
- Displacement: 6,600 tons standard, 8,480 tons full load
- Length: 156 m (511 ft 10 in)
- Beam: 17.3 m (56 ft 9 in)
- Draught: 6.5 m (21 ft 4 in)
- Propulsion: 2 shaft steam turbines, 4 boilers, 75,000 kW (100,000 hp), 2 fixed propellers, 2 turbo generators, and 2 diesel generators
- Speed: 32.7 knots (60.6 km/h; 37.6 mph)
- Range: 3,920 nmi (7,260 km; 4,510 mi) at 18 knots (33 km/h; 21 mph); 1,345 nmi (2,491 km; 1,548 mi) at 33 knots (61 km/h; 38 mph)
- Complement: 350
- Sensors & processing systems: Radar: Air target acquisition radar, 3 × navigation radars, 130 mm gun fire-control radars, 30 mm air-defence gun fire control radar; Sonar: Active and passive under-keel sonar; ES: Tactical situation plotting board, anti-ship missile fire control system, air defence, missile fire-control system, and torpedo fire control system
- Electronic warfare & decoys: 2 PK-2 decoy dispensers (200 rockets)
- Armament: Guns: 4 (2 × 2) AK-130 130 mm naval guns; 4 × 30 mm AK-630 CIWS; Missiles; 8 (2 × 4) (SS-N-22 'Sunburn') anti-ship missiles; 48 (2 × 24) SA-N-7 'Gadfly' surface-to-air missiles; Anti-submarine: 2 × 2 533 mm torpedo tubes; 2 × 6 RBU-1000 300 mm anti-submarine rocket launchers
- Aircraft carried: 1× Ka-27 series helicopter
- Aviation facilities: Helipad

Bespokoyny is a decommissioned Sovremenny-class destroyer of the Russian Navy preserved as museum ship.

== Development and design ==
The project began in the late 1960s when it was becoming obvious to the Soviet Navy that naval guns still had an important role particularly in support of amphibious landings, but existing gun cruisers and destroyers were showing their age. A new design was started, employing a new 130 mm automatic gun turret.

The ships were 156 metres (512 ft) in length, with a beam of 17.3 metres (56 ft 9 in) and a draught of 6.5 metres (21 ft 4 in).

== Construction and career ==
Bespokoyny was laid down on 18 April 1987 and launched on 9 June 1990 by Severnaya Verf in Leningrad. She was commissioned on 28 December 1991.

In September 2016, the ship was docked at the Yantar Baltic Shipyard for conversion. The ship's hull was sealed so that it could be afloat without maintenance by a permanent crew. On September 28, the press service of the enterprise reported that the destroyer would stay at the plant for about a month. During this time, the plant's specialists would carry out the full scope of work on its conversion. In particular, the screws and shafts would be removed, and the destroyer's hull preserved and painted.

On May 13, 2018, Bespokoyny arrived at a permanent anchorage at the base of the Baltic Fleet. It was turned into an exhibit of the military-historical complex of the Western Military District, and for the students of the Saint Petersburg regional branch of the Yunarmiya, the destroyer became a place for educational excursions.

In 2020, it was reported that Bespokoyny's two propellers had been stolen and sold for profit by a group that included the ship's former commanding officer.
