= Sovremenny-class destroyer =

Class of destroyer built for the Soviet Navy

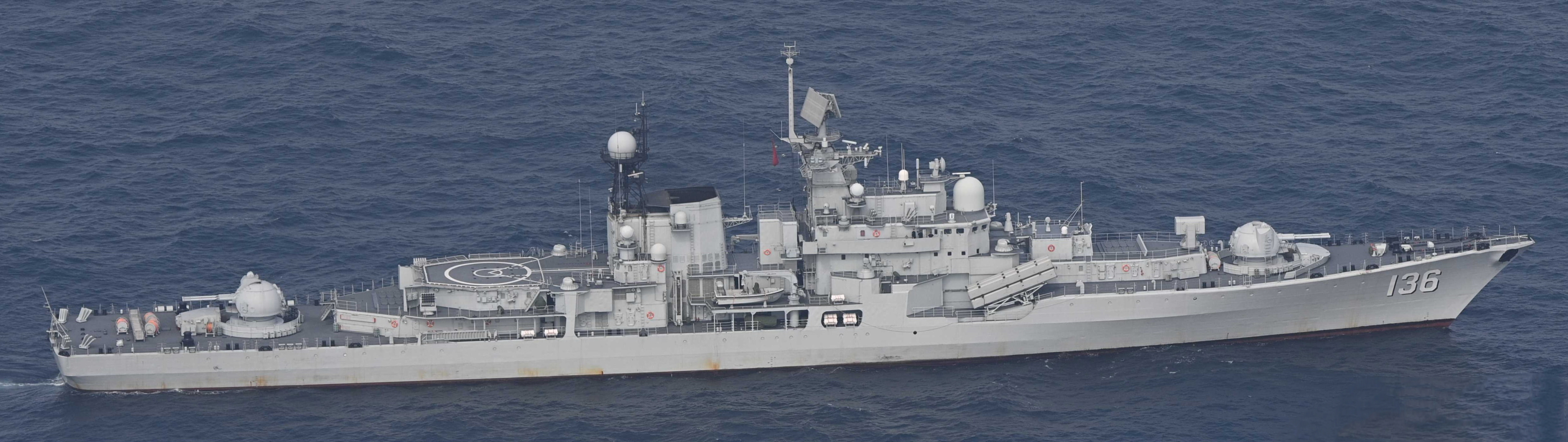
- Chinese refitted and modernized Project 956E PLAN destroyer Hangzhou equipped with vertical launching system (VLS)

Class overview
- Name: Sovremenny class
- Builders: Zhdanov Shipyard
- Operators: People's Liberation Army Navy (active); Russian Navy (retired); Soviet Navy (retired)
- Preceded by: Kashin class (Russia); Type 051B "Luhai" class (China)
- Succeeded by: Udaloy class (Russia); Type 052B "Luyang I" class (China)
- Subclasses: Project 956E; Project 956EM
- Built: 1976–2004
- In commission: 1981–present
- Planned: 25
- Completed: 21
- Canceled: 4
- Active: 4 (Chinese PLAN)
- Retired: 17
- Preserved: 1

General characteristics
- Type: Guided-missile destroyer
- Displacement: 6,600 tons standard, 7,940 tons full load
- Length: 156.5 m (513 ft 5 in)
- Beam: 17.2 m (56 ft 5 in)
- Draught: Main draught: 5.2 m (17 ft 1 in)
- Propulsion: 2 shaft steam turbines, 4 boilers, 75,000 kW (100,000 hp), 2 4-bladed fixed propellers, 2 turbo generators, and 2 diesel generators
- Speed: 32 knots (59 km/h; 37 mph)
- Range: 4,344.88 nmi (8,046.72 km; 5,000.00 mi) at 18 knots (33 km/h; 21 mph); 1,345 nmi (2,491 km; 1,548 mi) at 33 knots (61 km/h; 38 mph)
- Complement: 350
- Sensors & processing systems: Radar: Air/Surface Search radar MR-710 / MR-760 Fregat-MP (Type 382 radar variant for upgraded PLAN versions); Over-the-horizon (OTP) radar Mineral-ME (Type 366 radar for upgraded PLAN versions) used for surveillance and fire-control; P-80/P-270 fire control radar Ehkran 1; Smerch fire control radar Orekh; 130 mm gun fire control radar MR-184 Uragan; 30 mm CIWS fire control radar MR-105 Turem; Navigation radar MR-212 Volga; Sonar: Active and passive under-keel sonar; ES: Tactical situation plotting board, anti-ship missile fire control system, air defence, missile fire-control system, and torpedo fire control system
- Electronic warfare & decoys: All versions: Various electronic warfare (EW) systems including jammers; Chinese refitted versions: Project 956EM: 96 (4 × 24) H/RJZ-726-4A 24 barrel decoy dispenser; Project 956E: 48 (2 × 24) H/RJZ-726-4A 24 barrel decoy dispenser; 72 (8 × 9) 9 barrel decoy dispenser; Russian version and Chinese versions before modernization: 2 twin barrel PK-2 decoy dispensers (200 rocket decoys); RK-10 chaff/flares
- Armament: Chinese refitted Project 956EM version: 1 dual AK-130 130 mm naval guns; 2 × 30 mm Type 1130 gun-based CIWS (11 barreled rotary gun); 1 × HHQ-10 SAM-based CIWS (24-cell launcher); 8 (2 × 4) YJ-12 or YJ-15 anti-ship missiles; 48 cell (32 + 16) vertical launching systems (VLS) for HQ-16 surface to air missiles (SAM) and Yu-8 anti-submarine missiles; 6 (2 × 3) 324 mm torpedo tubes; Chinese refitted Project 956E version: 2 dual AK-130 130 mm naval guns; 4 × 30 mm AK-630 gun-based CIWS (6 barreled rotary gun); 1 × HHQ-10 SAM-based CIWS (24-cell launcher); 8 (2 × 4) YJ-12 anti-ship missiles; 32 cell (2 x 16) vertical launching systems (VLS) for HQ-16 surface to air missiles (SAM) and Yu-8 anti-submarine missiles; 6 (2 × 3) 324 mm torpedo tubes; Russian version: 2 dual AK-130 130 mm naval guns; 4 × 30 mm AK-630 CIWS (6 barreled rotary gun); 2 × 45 mm 21-K anti-aircraft gun (used as salute cannon); 8 (2 × 4) (SS-N-22 'Sunburn') anti-ship missiles; 2 single-arm launchers for 48 (2 × 24) SA-N-7 'Gadfly' (navalised Buk) surface-to-air missiles; 4 (2 × 2) 533 mm torpedo tubes for TEST-96 anti-submarine torpedoes or TEST-71ME anti-ship torpedoes; 2 × 6 RBU-1000 300 mm anti-submarine rocket launchers
- Aircraft carried: 1 × Ka-27 series or Ka-25 series helicopter
- Aviation facilities: One helipad and a hanger

The Sovremenny class, Soviet designation Project 956 Sarych (buzzard), is a class of anti-ship and anti-aircraft guided-missile destroyers of the Soviet and later Russian Navy. The ships are named after qualities, with "Sovremenny" translating as "modern" or "contemporary". All of the Russian ships have been retired from active service and one converted into a museum ship in 2018. Four modified ships (two Project 956E and two Project 956EM) were delivered to the People's Liberation Army Navy, and remain in service. Those four ships were also refitted as multipurpose destroyers with more modern Chinese-made sensors and vertical launching system (VLS) along with the latest generation of Chinese-made weaponry during their midlife modernization.

The Sovremenny class are guided-missile destroyers, primarily tasked with anti-ship warfare, while also providing sea and air defense for warships and transports under escort. The class was designed to be complemented by the Udaloy-class destroyers, which were fitted primarily for anti-submarine operations.

== History ==
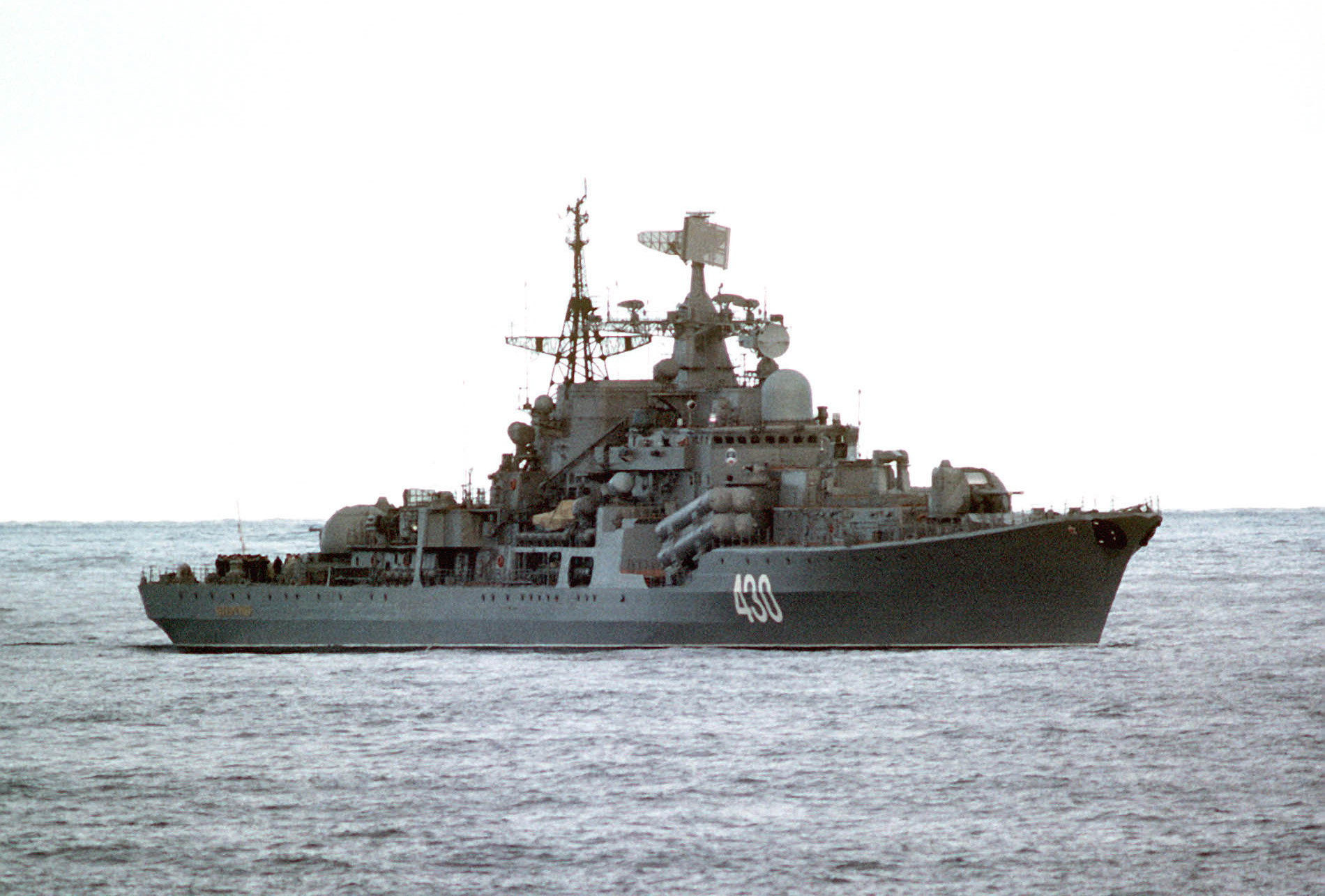
Bezuprechny in August 1986

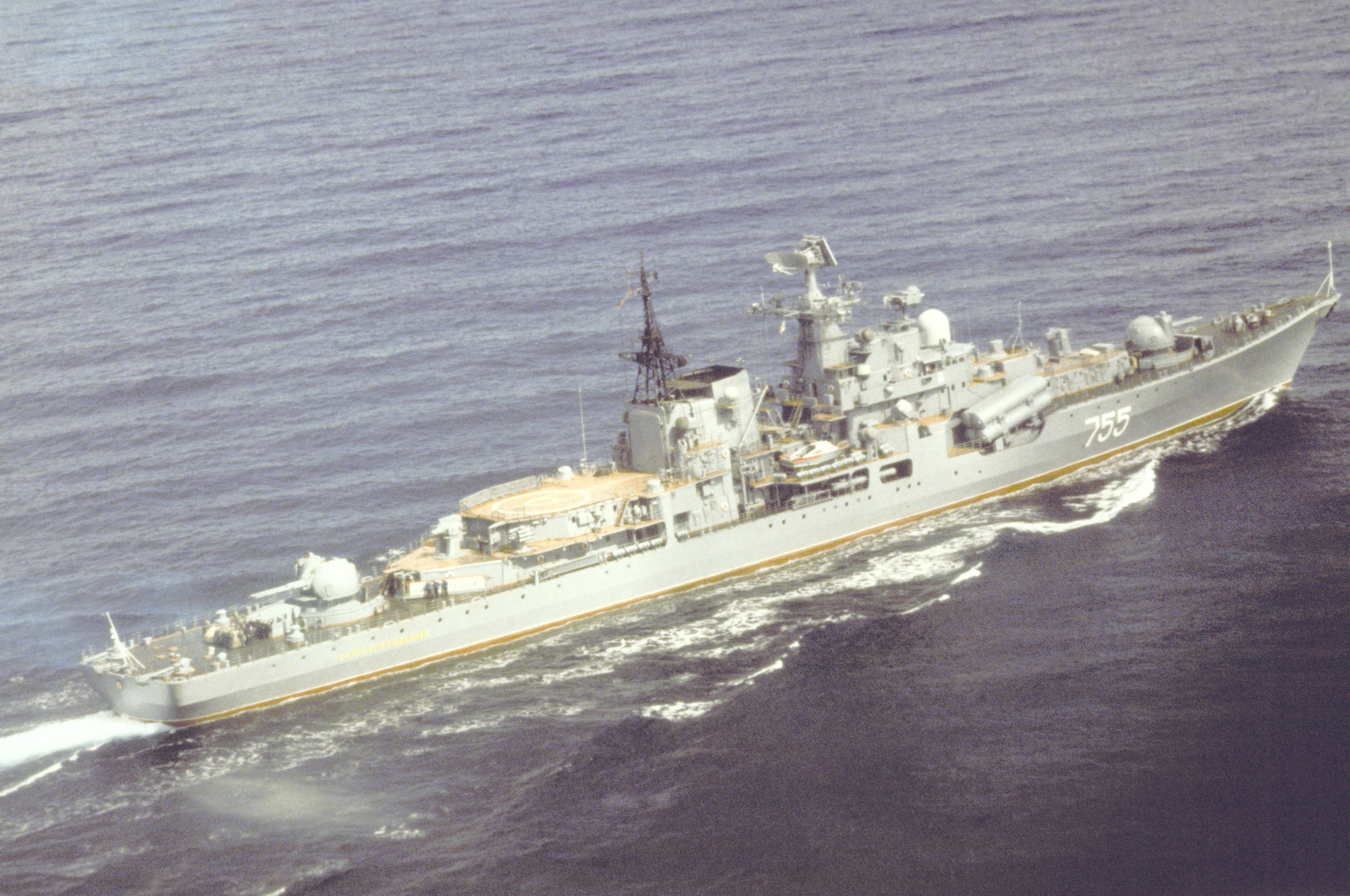
Sovremenny-class destroyer Osmotritelny

The project began in the late 1960s when it was becoming obvious in the Soviet Navy that naval guns still had an important role, particularly in support of amphibious landings, but existing gun cruisers and destroyers were showing their age. A new design was started, employing a new 130 mm automatic gun turret. Single and twin mounts were developed, and the twin mount was chosen for its superior rate of fire. In 1971 a go-ahead was given for the Severnaya design bureau to design "a ship capable of supporting amphibious landings". At the same time, the United States Navy was constructing new large Spruance-class multi-role destroyers. To respond to this new threat, Project 956 was updated with a new air defence suite and new, powerful 3M80 anti-ship missiles. Although the Soviet Navy had largely moved to gas turbine propulsion for its new warships, steam turbines were selected instead for Project 956: partly because production of naval gas turbines would have been insufficient for the entire program. The lead ship of the class, Sovremenny was laid down in 1976 and commissioned in January, 1981. A total of 17 were built for the Russian Navy. All the ships were built by Severnaya Verf 190 in St. Petersburg.

These ships have a maximum displacement of 7,940 tons. The ships are 156.5 metres (513 ft 5 in) in length, with a beam of 17.2 metres (56 ft 5 in) and a draught of 5.2 metres (17 ft 1 in). They are armed with an anti-submarine helicopter, 48 air defence missiles, eight anti-ship missiles, torpedoes, mines, long-range guns and a sophisticated electronic warfare system.

There are a total of four versions of this class: the original Project 956 armed with the 3M80 version of the Moskit anti-ship missile, and its successor, the Project 956A, which is armed with the improved 3M80M version of the Moskit with longer range. The main difference between the two is that the missile launching tubes on Project 956A are longer than that of Project 956 to accommodate the increased size of the newer missile, and these launching tubes can be used to fire/store the original 3M80 as well. A third and fourth version, Project 956E and Project 956EM, later developed for the People's Liberation Army Navy Surface Force was the latest development of this class. Chinese media called the ship a "carrier killer".

== Design of the PLAN Project 956E and Project 956EM ==
The Chinese People's Liberation Army Navy Surface Force (PLAN) had two modified Sovremenny-class destroyers delivered in December 1999 and November 2000, designated as Project 956E, with improved electronic gears. In 2002, the PLAN ordered two improved versions designated Project 956EM. The first vessel was launched in St Petersburg on 23 July 2004, while the second was launched in 2006. All four vessels were commissioned to the East Sea Fleet.

On the improved Project Project 956EM, the aft AK-130 main gun was removed. The four AK-630 CIWS were replaced by two sets of Kashtan CIWS (later replaced by two Type 1130 gun-based CIWS and one HHQ-10 missile-based CIWS) short-range air defence gun/missile systems. Each Kashtan system comprises a 3R86E1 command module and two 3R87E combat modules. Each 3R87E combat module has two 30 mm GSh-30k six-barrel automatic guns (range 0.5–4 km (0.31–2.49 mi)) and two SA-N-11 air defence missiles. The missile is armed with a 9 kg (20 lb) warhead and has a range of 1.5–8 km (0.93–4.97 mi). This improved 956EM version is also the first to be armed with the newer version of SS-N-22, the P-270 Moskit (later replaced by YJ-12A), which is reported to have a designation of 3-M80MBE and possibly funded by China (according to Russian sources), and the new missile differs from the older ones mainly in that the range is increased from 120 km (75 mi) to 200 km (120 mi). The air defense software is upgraded to accommodate the newer SA-N-12/SA-17 SAM system (later replaced by VLS launched HHQ-16), but since China had already joined Russia in developing an even newer successor, it is not clear if SA-N-12/SA-17 has entered Chinese service in large numbers.

In 2006, the extra spheres (painted white in the mid-2006) added atop of the superstructures of the Chinese ships appearing in the latest photographs of the Chinese units have shown that these Chinese ships had been upgraded with the domestic HN-900 Data link (the Chinese equivalent of Link 11A/B, to be upgraded) and SATCOM (probably the SNTI-240).

From mid-2014, all four Chinese Sovremenny-class destroyers are planned to undergo a midlife upgrade program. The refit replaced original components with domestic systems. In addition to the replacement of electronics and sensors, armament upgrades include replacing 2x4 3M80E Moskit anti-ship missiles with 2x4 YJ-12A supersonic missiles and swapping two launchers for 48 SA-N-12 SAMs with sets of 8-cell vertical launch systems totaling 48 or 32 cells for HQ-16C or Yu-8 anti-submarine missiles.

- Project cost: 600 million US$ (mid-1990s price) was the price paid for Project 956A (two ships), and 1.4 billion US$ (early-2000s price) for Project 956EM (two ships).
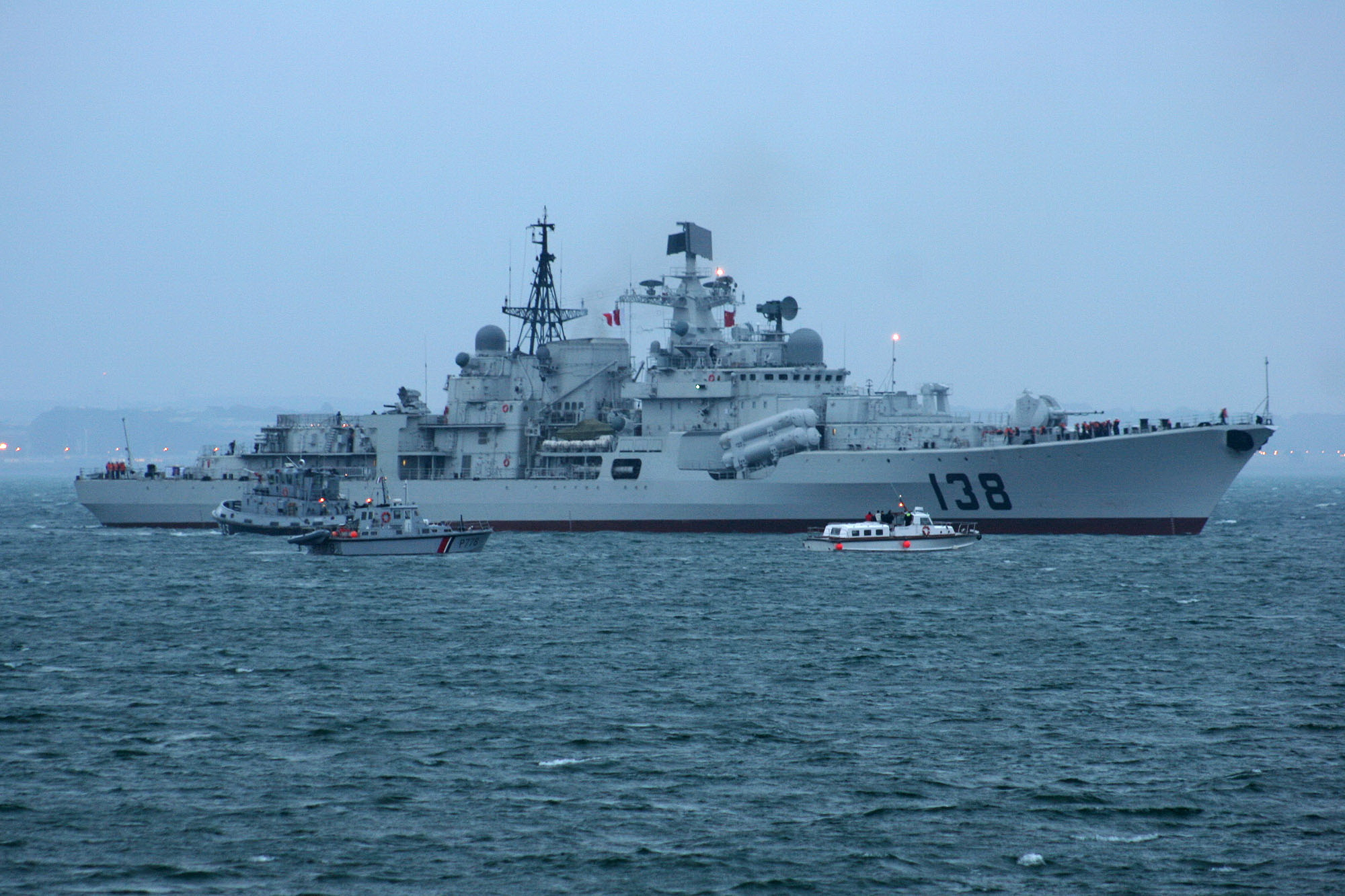
The third Sovremenny-class (first Project 956EM) destroyer sold to China was delivered in December 2005.

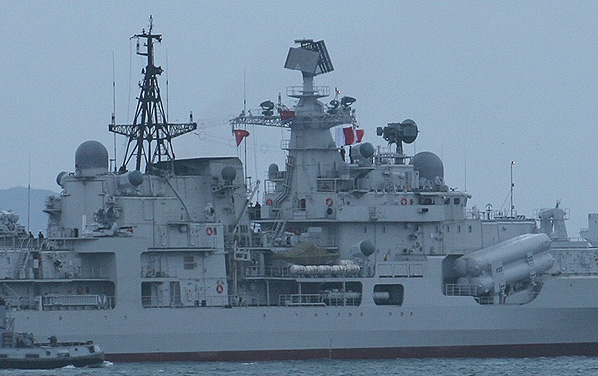
Project 956EM version equipped with more capable two Close-In Weapon System (CIWS) instead of four

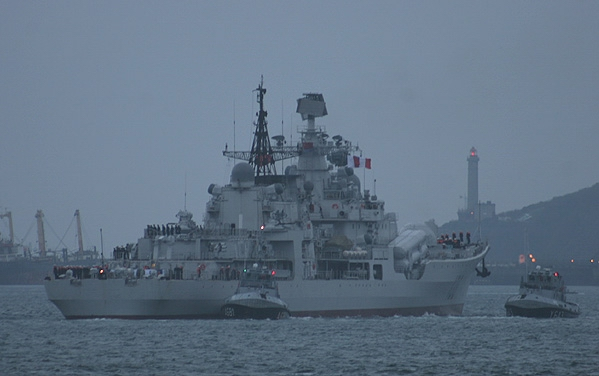
The rear main gun has been removed from the Project 956EM.

== Design of the Soviet / Russian Project 956 and Project 956A ==
=== Command and control ===
The ship's combat systems can use target designation data from the ship's active and passive sensors, from other ships in the fleet, from surveillance aircraft or via a communications link from the ship's helicopter. The multi-channel defence suite is capable of striking several targets simultaneously.

=== Missiles ===
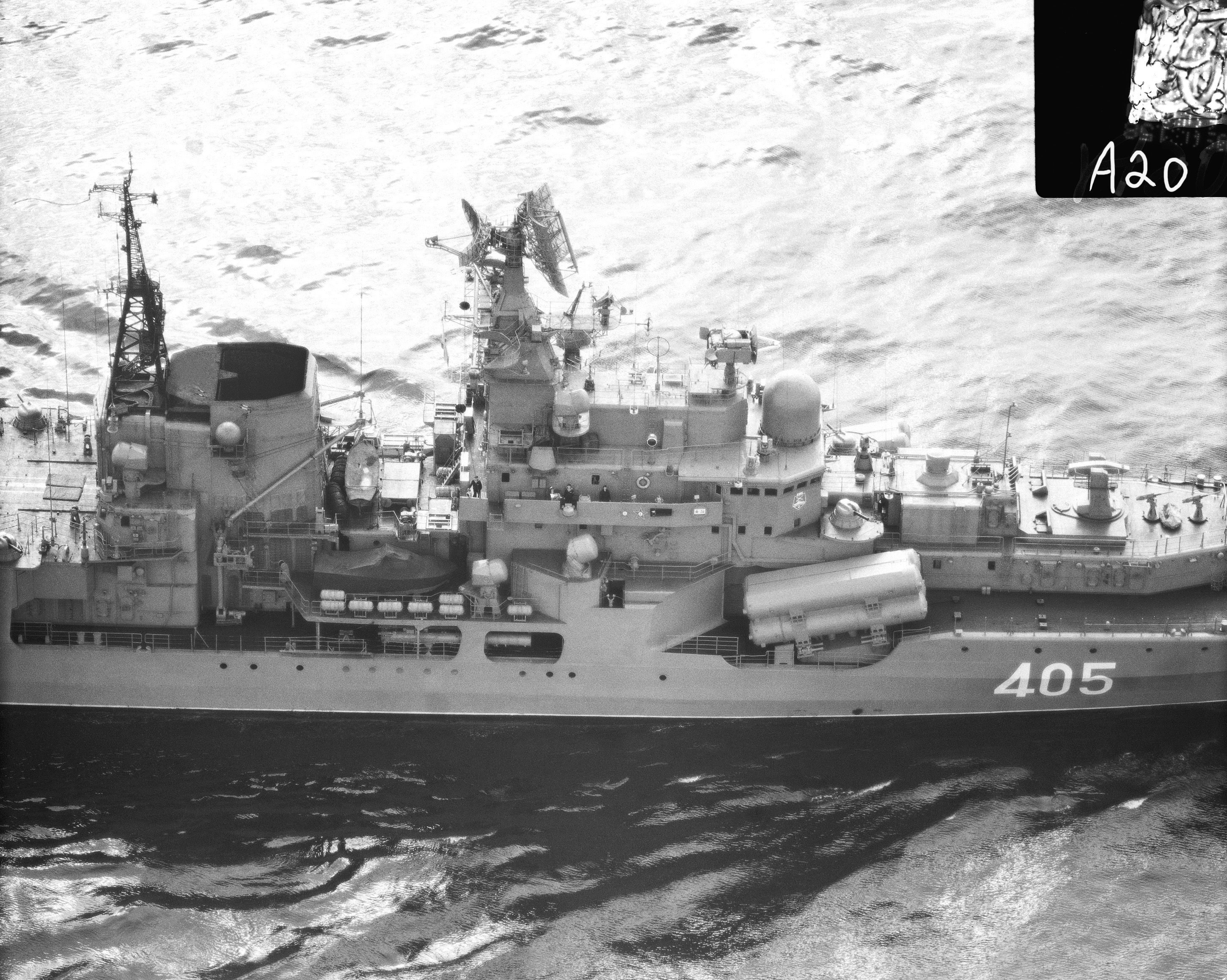
Midships view

The ship is outfitted with the Raduga Moskit anti-ship missile system with two four-cell launchers installed port and starboard of the forward island and set at an angle of about 15°. The ship carries a total of eight Moskit 3M80E missiles, NATO designation SS-N-22 Sunburn. The missile is sea-skimming with a velocity of Mach 2.5, armed with a 300-kilogram (660 lb) high-explosive or a nuclear 200 kt warhead. The range is from 10 to 120 kilometres (6.2 to 74.6 mi). The launch weight is 4,000 kg (8,800 lb).

Two Shtil surface-to-air missile systems are installed, each on the raised deck behind the twin-barrelled 130 mm guns. Shtil is the export name of the SA-N-7, NATO reporting name Gadfly. (From the 9th ship onwards, the same launcher is used for SA-17 Grizzly/SA-N-12 Yezh.) The system uses the ship's three-dimensional circular scan radar for target tracking. Up to three missiles can be aimed simultaneously. The range is up to 25 km (16 mi) against targets with speeds up to 830 metres per second (2,700 ft/s). The ship carries 48 Shtil missiles.

=== Guns ===
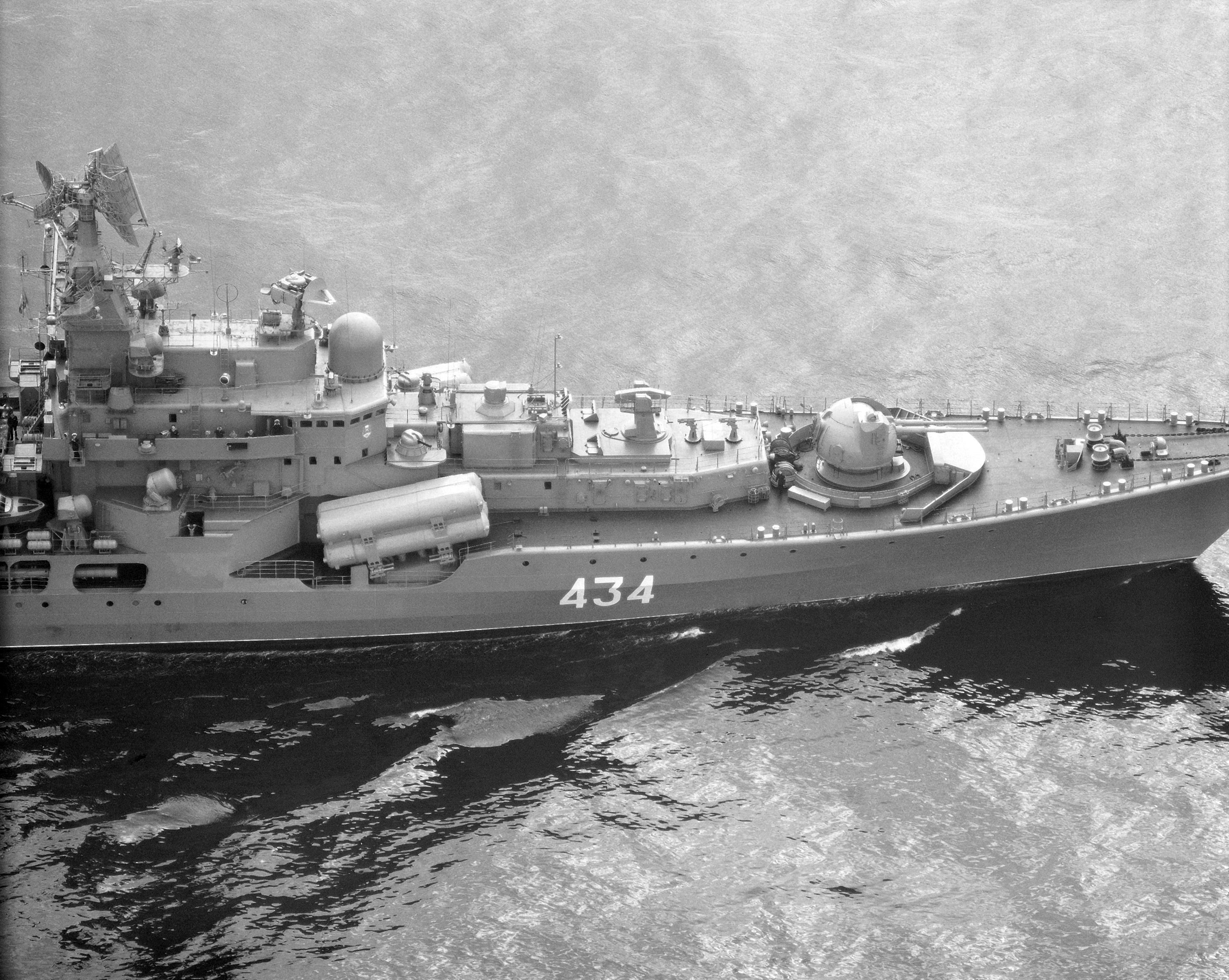
Bow view

The ship's 130-millimetre (5.1 in) guns are the AK-130-MR-184. The system includes a computer control system with electronic and television sighting. The gun can be operated in fully automatic mode from the radar control system, under autonomous control using the turret-mounted Kondensor optical sighting system, and can also be laid manually. The rate of fire is disputed, but various Russian sources credit the weapon with a cyclic rate of 30–40 rounds per minute per barrel, in line with the French Creusot-Loire 100 mm or the Italian OTO Melara 127 mm/54, but faster than the US Mark 45.

The ship has four six-barreled 30 mm AK-630 auto-cannon systems. The maximum rate of fire is 5,000 rounds/min. Range is up to 4,000 m for low flying anti-ship missiles and 5,000 m for light surface targets. The gun is outfitted with radar and television detection and tracking. The latest Sovremennys carry the Kashtan CIWS system instead of AK-630.

=== Anti-submarine systems ===
The destroyers have two double 533 mm (21 in) torpedo tubes and two six-barrel RBU-1000 anti-submarine rocket launchers, with 48 rockets. Range is 1,000 metres (1,100 yd). The rocket is armed with a 55 kg (121 lb) warhead.

=== Helicopter ===
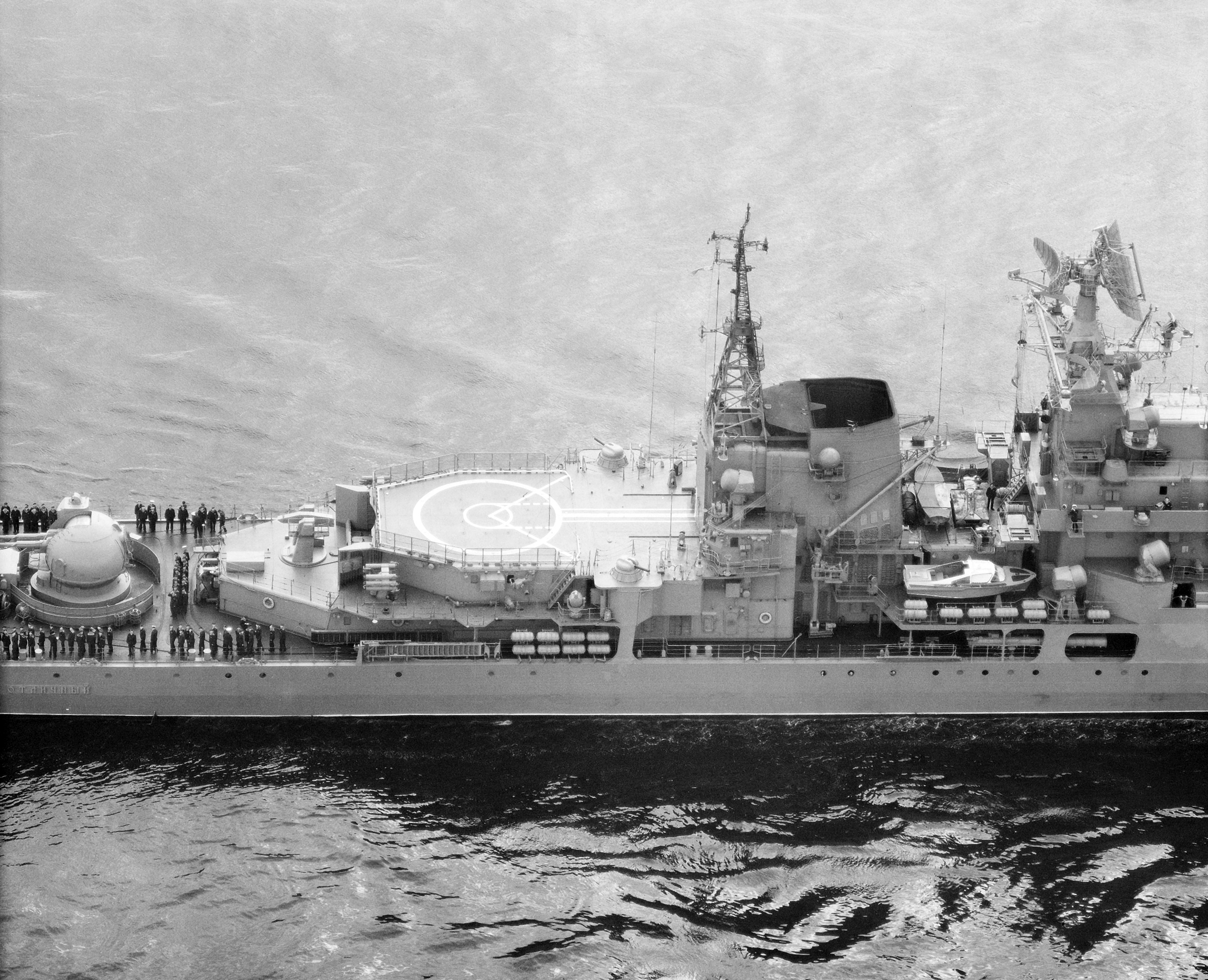
Helicopter pad

The ship's helicopter pad and telescopic hangar accommodate one Kamov Ka-27 anti-submarine warfare helicopter, NATO codename Helix. The helicopter can operate in conditions up to Sea State 5 and up to 200 km (120 mi) from the host ship.

=== Countermeasures ===
The Project 956 destroyer is fitted with an electronic countermeasures system and carries a store of 200 rockets for the two decoy dispensers, model PK-2.

=== Sensors ===
==== Radar ====
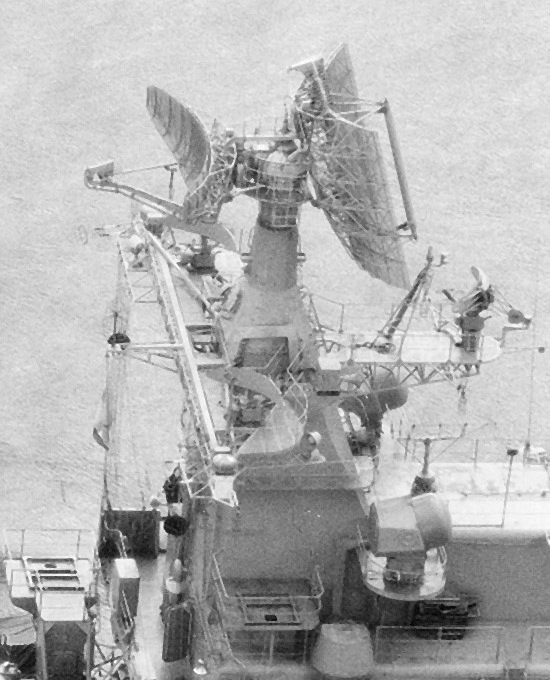
MR-710 radar on destroyer Otlichny

The complete sensor suite and ECM comprises: 3D radar 'Top Steer' (MR-710), replaced later with 'Top Plate' (MR-760), 230 km range vs fighters and 50 km vs missiles and a total of 40 targets can be simultaneously tracked; Mineral system ('Band Stand') to allow the SS-N 22 guidance; 3 navigation and surface control radar MR-201 e 212; 2 'Bass Tilt' (MR-123) for CIWS; 6 'Front Dome'(MR-90) radar for SA-N-7 guidance (a very large arrangement to assure an effective defense against saturation attacks), linked with 3D radar and two SAM launcher (5 missile min each); 1 'Kite Screech' radar for 130 mm (MR-184 Lev). ECM and ESM are many: 2 ESM MR-410 or MP-405; 2 ECM MRP-11M or 12M ('Bell Shroud'), 2 'Bell Squat', 4 'Football B' and one MR-407; 2 PK-2M rocket launchers (140 mm), and 8 PK-10 (120 mm), 2–8 laser warning receiver systems Spektr-E, one Squeeze Box (TV, laser and IR system).

==== Sonar ====
Medium and high frequencies (M/HF) MGK-355 Platina integrated sonar system with NATO reporting name Bull Horn, including the MG-335 hull-mounted array. Type 956 originally only carries the hull-mounted array because the ASW gear of this class is primarily for self-defence. For Type 956A, an improved MGK-355MS Platina is carried, which includes hull-mounted array, VDS, and towed array, with NATO reporting names Bull Nose / Mare Tail / Steer Hide respectively. It is reported that Type 956EM is equipped with the successor of MGK-355/355MS, the MGK-355TA integrated sonar system, which includes both the hull-mounted and towed arrays (with NATO reporting name Horse Jaw & Horse Tail respectively).

=== Propulsion ===
The ship's propulsion system is based on two steam turbine engines each producing 37,000 kW (50,000 hp) together with four high-pressure boilers. There are two fixed-pitch propellers. The ship's maximum speed is just under 32 knots (59 km/h; 37 mph). At a fuel-economic speed of 18 knots (33 km/h; 21 mph) the range is 5,000 nautical miles (9,300 km; 5,800 mi). Several ships of this class suffered from problems regarding their propulsion system that were so severe that they had to be retired.

== Ships ==
=== Active ships ===
Name	Namesake	Project	Laid down	Launched	Commissioned	Fleet	Status
People's Liberation Army Navy
Hangzhou (ex-Vazhny)	City of Hangzhou	956E	4 November 1988	27 May 1994	25 December 1999	East Sea	Active
Fuzhou (ex-Vdumchivy)	City of Fuzhou	956E	22 April 1989	16 April 1999	20 November 2000	East Sea	Active
Taizhou (ex-Vnushitelny)	City of Taizhou, Jiangsu	956EM	3 July 2002	27 April 2004	28 December 2005	East Sea	Active
Ningbo (ex-Vechny)	City of Ningbo	956EM	15 November 2002	23 July 2004	27 September 2006	East Sea	Active

=== Decommissioned ships ===
Name	Namesake	Project	Laid down	Launched	Commissioned	Fleet	Status
Russian Navy
Sovremenny	Modern	956	3 March 1976	18 November 1978	25 December 1980	Northern	Decommissioned in 1998
Otchayanny	Reckless	956	1 March 1977	29 March 1980	30 September 1982	Northern	Decommissioned in 1998
Otlichny	Excellent	956	22 April 1978	21 March 1981	30 September 1983	Northern	Decommissioned in 1998
Osmotritelny	Circumspect	956	27 October 1978	24 April 1982	30 September 1984	Pacific	Decommissioned in 1998
Bezuprechny	Impeccable	956	29 January 1981	25 July 1983	6 November 1985	Northern	Decommissioned in 2001
Boyevoy	Militant	956	26 March 1982	4 August 1984	28 September 1986	Pacific	Decommissioned in 2010
Stoyky	Steadfast	956	28 September 1982	27 July 1985	31 December 1986	Pacific	Decommissioned in 1998
Okrylyonny	Winged	956	16 April 1983	31 May 1986	30 December 1987	Northern	Decommissioned in 1998
Burny	Impetuous	956	4 November 1983	30 December 1986	30 September 1988	Pacific	Out of service since 2005
Gremyashchy (ex-Veduschy)	Thunderous	956	23 November 1984	30 May 1987	30 December 1988	Northern	Decommissioned in 2006
Bystry	Quick	956	29 October 1985	28 November 1987	30 September 1989	Pacific	Decommissioned in 2022
Rastoropny	Prompt	956	15 August 1986	4 June 1988	30 December 1989	Northern	Decommissioned in 2012
Bezboyaznenny	Fearless	956	8 January 1987	18 February 1989	28 December 1990	Pacific	Decommissioned in 2016
Gremyashchy (ex-Bezuderzhny)	Thunderous	956	24 February 1987	30 September 1989	25 June 1991	Northern	Decommissioned in 2013
Bespokoyny	Restless	956A	18 April 1987	9 June 1990	28 December 1991	Baltic	Decommissioned in 2018, museum ship in Kronstadt
Nastoychivy (ex-Moskovsky Komsomolets)	Persistent	956A	7 April 1988	19 January 1991	30 December 1992	Baltic	Decommissioned
Admiral Ushakov (ex-Besstrashny)	Fyodor Ushakov (ex-Fearless)	956A	6 May 1988	28 December 1991	30 December 1993	Northern	Decommissioned in 2025

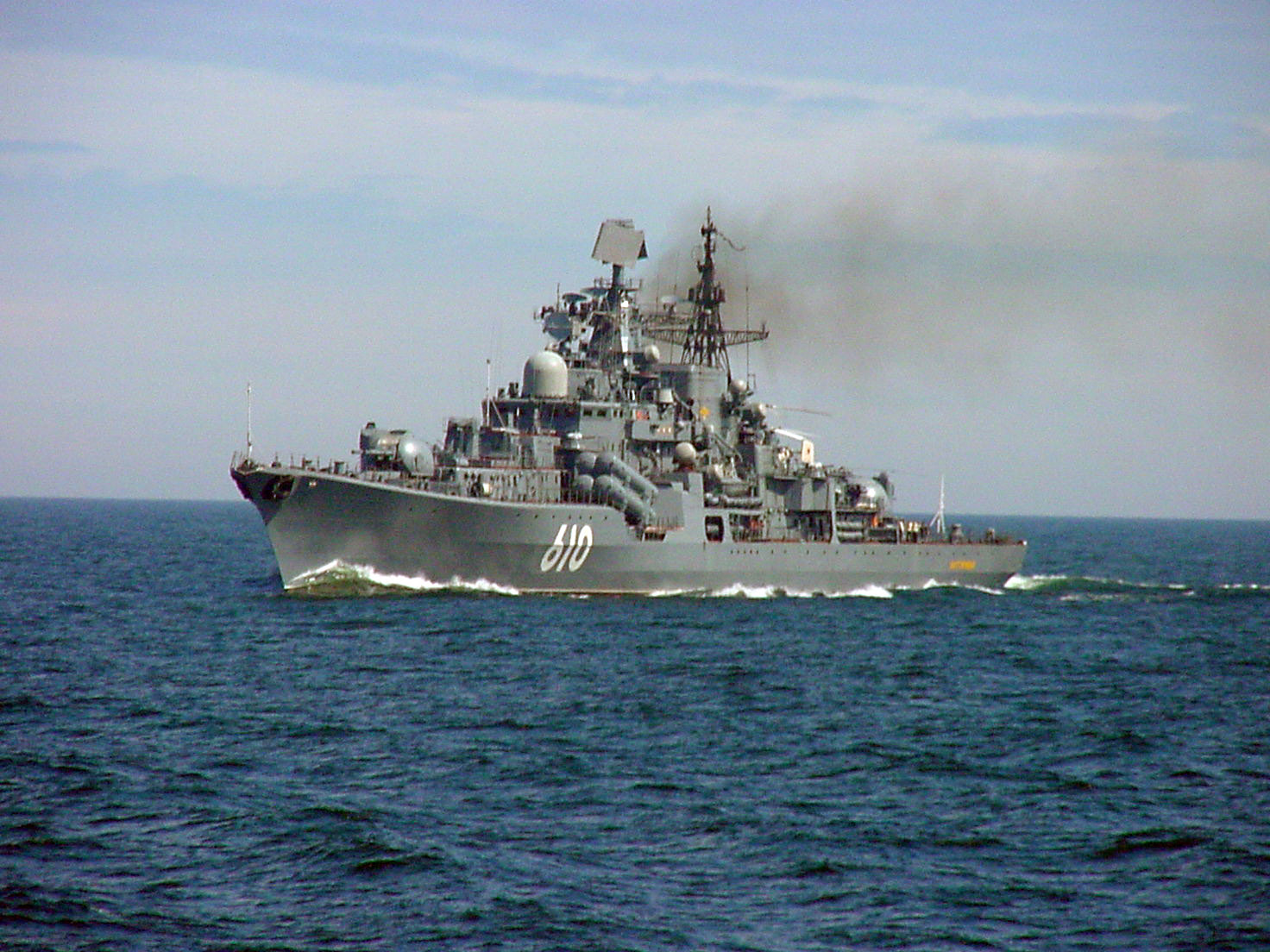
Nastoychivy underway in the Baltic Sea off the coast of Ventspils, Latvia (2005)

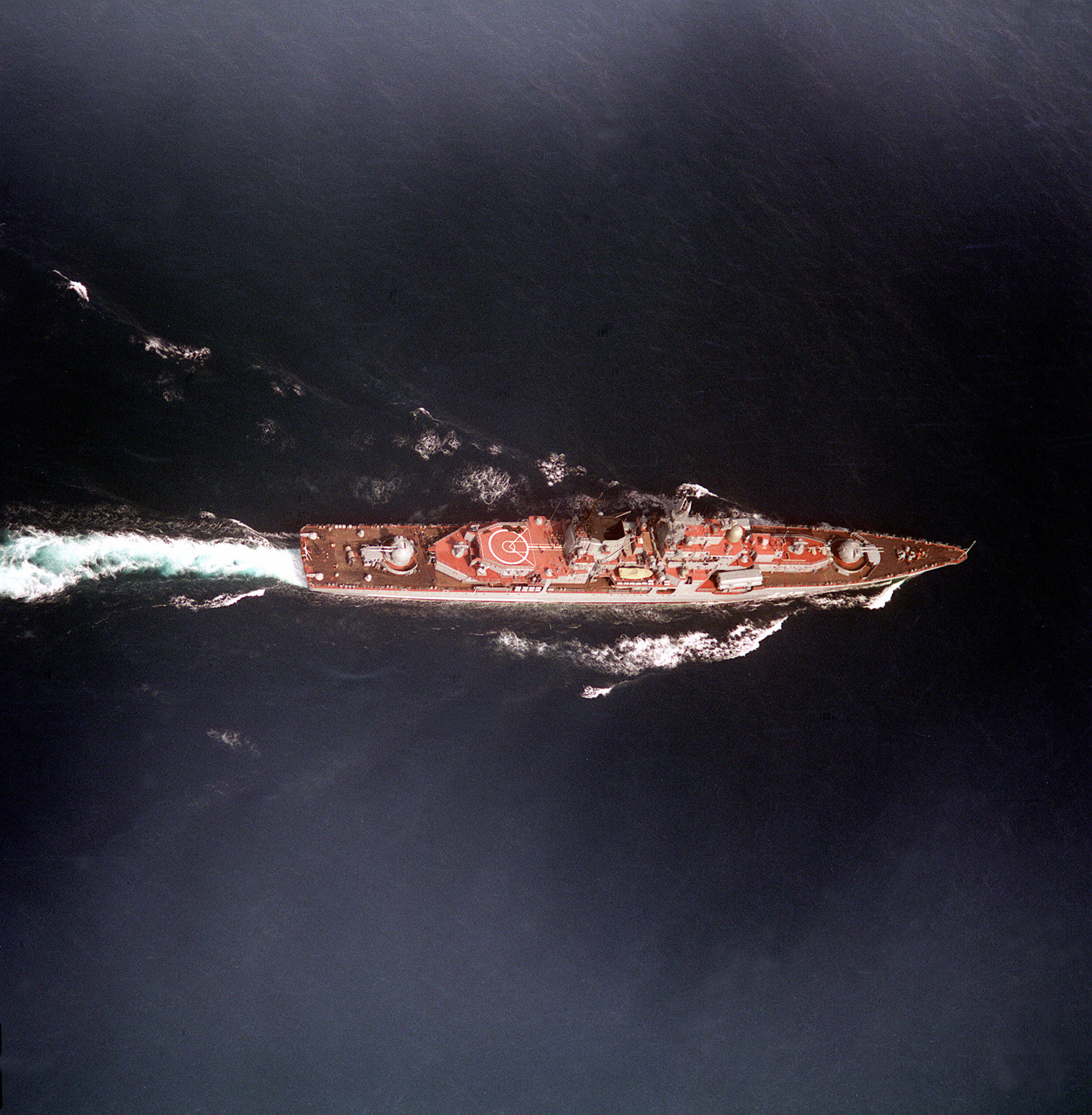
Overhead view of Stoyky

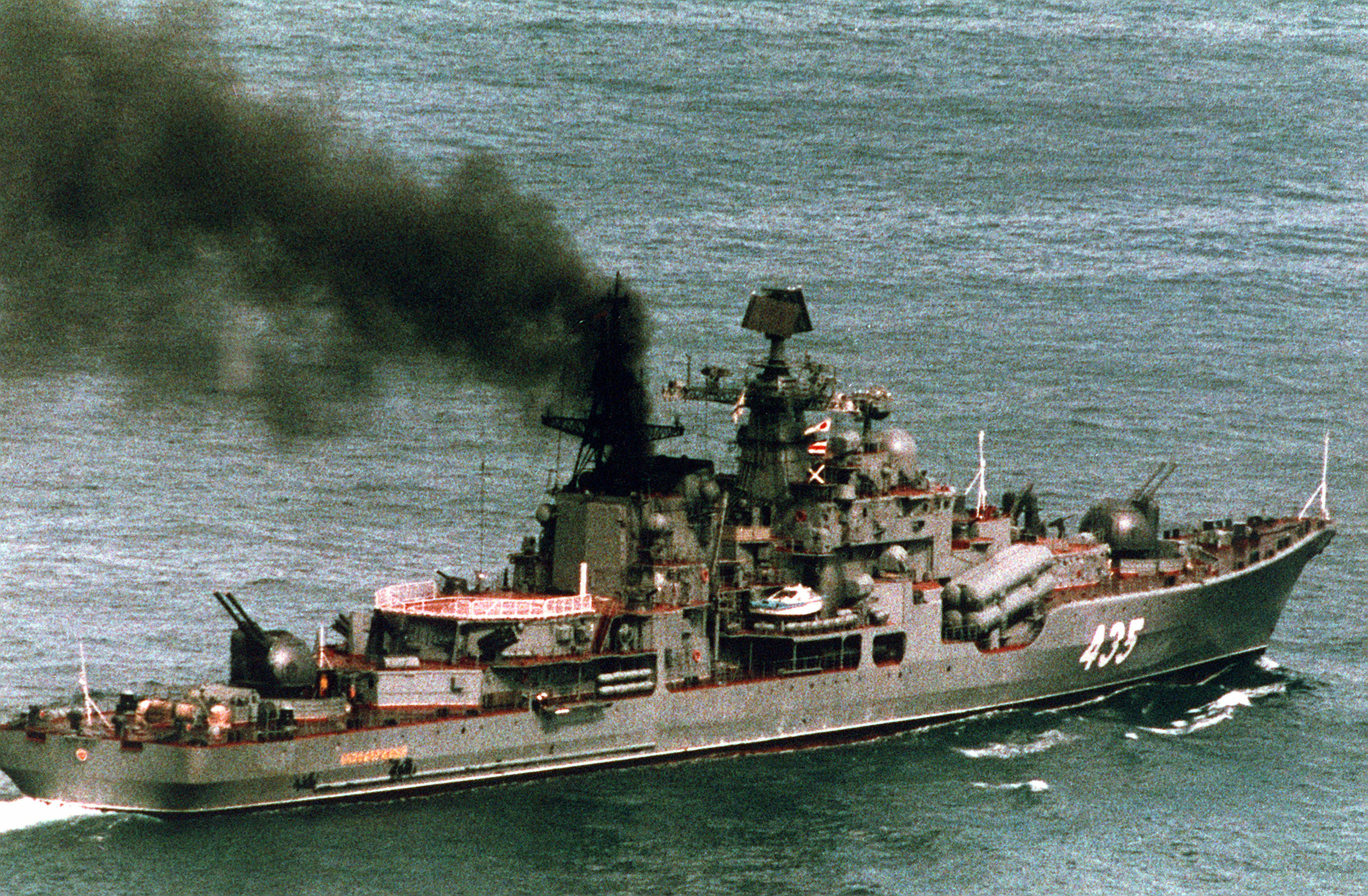
Sovremenny-class destroyer Bezuderzhny underway

== See also ==
- List of destroyer classes in service
- List of active Russian Navy ships
- List of ships of Russia by project number

Equivalent destroyers of the same era

- Type 42
- Spruance class
- Tachikaze class
- Iroquois class
- Audace class
- Gangwon class
- Type 051

== Bibliography ==
- Friedman, Norman (1995). "Soviet Union 1947–1991: Russian Federation and Successor States 1991–". In Chumbley, Stephen (ed.). Conway's All the World's Fighting Ships, 1947–1995. Naval Institute Press. pp. 337–426. ISBN 1-55750-132-7.
- Dahm, J. Michael (2020). Air and Surface Radar (PDF) (Report). South China Sea Military Capabilities Series. Johns Hopkins University Applied Physics Laboratory.
- Pavlov, A. S. (1997). Warships of the USSR and Russia 1945–1995. Naval Institute Press. ISBN 1-55750-671-X.
- Radziemski, Jan (2026). Soviet Cold War Destroyers. Osprey Publishing. ISBN 978-1-4728-7489-4.
