= Soviet cruiser Admiral Oktyabrsky =

Soviet Kresta II-class cruiser

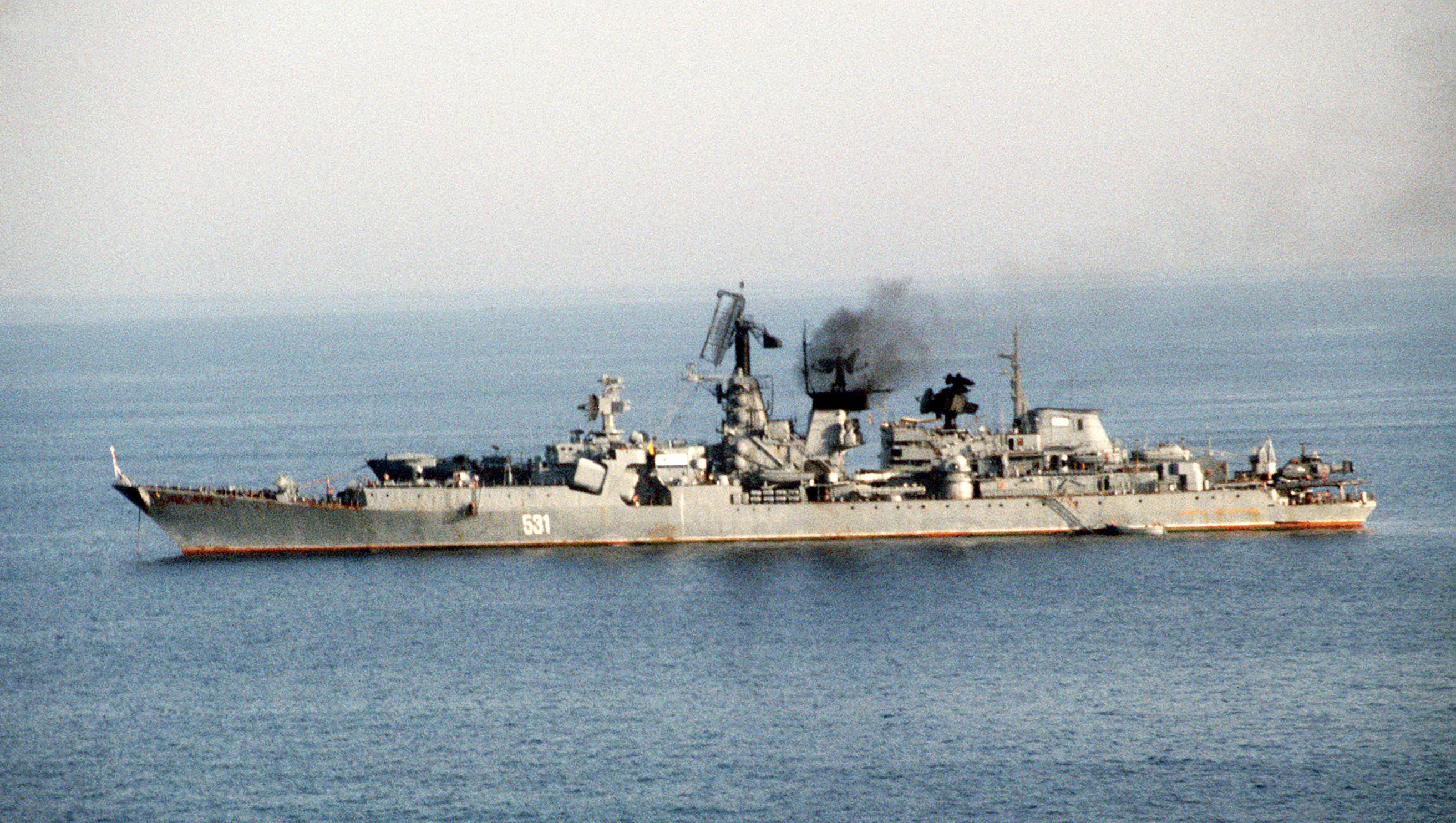
- Admiral Oktyabrsky at anchor in the Strait of Hormuz, October 1990

History

→ Soviet Union → Russia
- Name: Admiral Oktyabrsky
- Namesake: Filipp Oktyabrsky
- Builder: Zhdanov Shipyard
- Laid down: 2 June 1969
- Launched: 21 May 1971
- Commissioned: 28 December 1973
- Decommissioned: 30 June 1993
- Fate: Sold for scrap, 1993

General characteristics
- Class & type: Kresta II-class cruiser
- Displacement: 5,640 t (5,551 long tons) (standard); 7,575 t (7,455 long tons) (full load)
- Length: 156.5 m (513.5 ft) (o/a)
- Beam: 17.2 m (56.4 ft)
- Draught: 5.96 m (19.6 ft)
- Installed power: 4 × boilers; 91,000 shp (68,000 kW)
- Propulsion: 2 × shafts; 2 x steam turbines
- Speed: 34 kn (63 km/h; 39 mph)
- Range: 5,200 nmi (9,600 km; 6,000 mi) at 18 knots (33 km/h; 21 mph)
- Complement: 343
- Sensors & processing systems: Radar; Volga; MR-600 Voskhod; MR-310U Angara M; 2 x 4R60 Grom; 2 x MR-103 Bars; 2 x MR-123 Vympel; Sonar; MG-332T Titan-2T
- Armament: 2 × quadruple Metel Anti-Ship Complex anti-submarine missiles; 2 × twin M-11 Shtorm surface-to-air missile launchers (48 missiles); 2 × twin 57 mm (2.2 in) AK-725 dual purpose guns; 4 × sextuple 30 mm (1.2 in) AK-630 CIWS; 2 × quintuple 533 mm (21.0 in) torpedo tubes
- Aircraft carried: 1 Kamov Ka-25 'Hormone-A'
- Aviation facilities: Helicopter deck and hangar

Admiral Oktyabrsky (Russian: Адмирал Октябрьский) was a Project 1134A Berkut A (NATO reporting name Kresta II)-class cruiser of the Soviet Navy, which briefly became part of the Russian Navy. The sixth ship of her class, the ship served mostly during the Cold War, from 1973 to 1993.

She served with the Pacific Fleet for the duration of her career, often operating in the Indian Ocean and the Pacific in order to show the flag. Admiral Oktyabrsky cruised in the Indian and the Pacific Oceans during 1974, 1977, and 1978, spending a year in refit until late 1979. She returned to the Indian Ocean in 1980 and underwent a lengthy refit between 1982 and 1986, before being sent to the Persian Gulf in 1990. Due to reduced naval funding, the cruiser was decommissioned in 1993 before being sold for scrap.

== Design ==
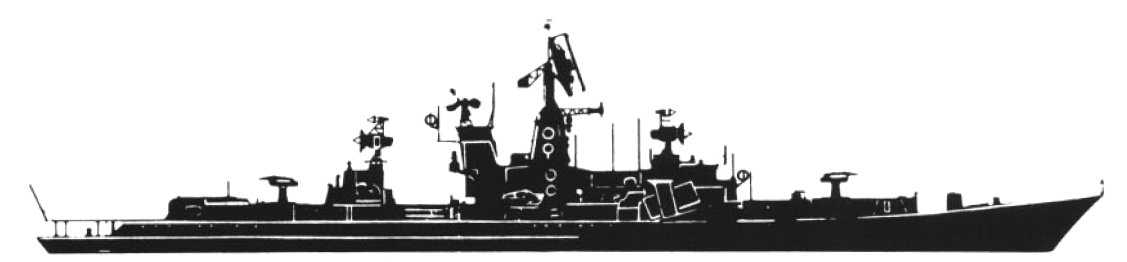
A United States Navy-produced profile drawing of a Kresta II-class cruiser

Admiral Oktyabrsky was the sixth ship of her class of ten Soviet Designation Project 1134A Berkut A (NATO reporting name Kresta II-class) cruisers, designed by Vasily Anikeyev. The vessels were designated as Large Anti-Submarine Ships and were initially designed with a primary mission of countering NATO ballistic missile submarines, particularly the United States Navy fleet of Polaris-equipped submarines. However, before the ships began to be built, Admiral Sergey Gorshkov, commander-in-chief of the Soviet Navy, changed the role of the ships to that of destroying NATO attack submarines to allow Soviet Yankee-class ballistic missile submarines to reach the central Atlantic and Pacific, from which the latter could launch their comparatively short-ranged ballistic missiles against targets in the United States.

The Kresta II-class cruisers were 156.5 metres (513.5 ft) long with a beam of 17.2 m (56.4 ft) and a draught of 5.96 m (19.6 ft). She displaced 5,640 tonnes (5,551 long tons) standard and 7,575 tonnes (7,455 long tons) full load, and had a complement of 343. The ship was equipped with a hangar aft to carry a single Kamov Ka-25 Hormone-A helicopter.

Admiral Oktyabrsky was propelled by two TV-12 steam geared turbines powered by four high-pressure boilers, which created 91,000 shaft horsepower (68,000 kilowatts), giving her a maximum speed of 34 knots (63 km/h; 39 mph). She had a range of 5,200 nautical miles (9,600 kilometres; 6,000 miles) at 18 kn (33 km/h; 21 mph) and 1,755 nmi (3,250 km; 2,020 mi) at 32 kn (59 km/h; 37 mph).

=== Armament ===
For her primary role as an anti-submarine cruiser, Admiral Oktyabrsky mounted two quadruple launchers for eight anti-submarine missiles in the Metel anti-ship complex (NATO reporting name SS-N-14 Silex). She was also equipped with two 12-barrel RBU-6000 and two 6-barrel RBU-1000 anti-submarine rocket launchers. The Ka-25 helicopter embarked on the cruiser was also capable of aiding in the search for and destruction of submarines.

Admiral Oktyabrsky was armed with a total of four AK-725 57-millimeter (2.2 in) dual-purpose guns in two twin mountings to protect against surface and aerial threats. She also had four 30-millimeter (1.2 in) AK-630 close-in weapon system mountings, and was armed with two twin launchers for the 48 V-611 surface-to-air missiles carried in the M-11 Shtorm system (NATO reporting name SA-N-3 Goblet). She had two quintuple mountings for 533-millimeter (21.0 in) dual-role torpedoes.

=== Sensors and electronic warfare ===
Admiral Oktyabrsky was equipped with the MR-600 Voskhod (NATO code name Top Sail) early-warning radar, the MR-310U Angara-M (NATO code name Head Net C) search radar, and the Volga (NATO code names Don Kay and Don-2) navigational radar. For anti-submarine warfare she had an improved MG-332T Titan-2T hull-mounted sonar. She mounted two Grom fire-control systems for the Shtorm and two MR-103 Bars systems for the AK-725s. Admiral Oktyabrsky also had a MG-26 communications outfit. Admiral Oktyabrsky was the second ship of her class completed with the MR-123 Vympel fire control radar for the AK-630, as the first four ships had not received it.

Her electronic warfare equipment included the MRP-15-16 Zaliv and two sets each of the MRP-11-12 and MRP-13-14 direction finding systems, as well as the MRP-150 Gurzuf A and MRP-152 Gurzuf B radar jamming devices.

== Construction and service ==
On 14 September 1969, Admiral Oktyabrsky, named for the Soviet World War II naval commander Filipp Oktyabrsky, was added to the list of ships of the Soviet Navy. Built in the Zhdanov Shipyard with the serial number 726, the cruiser was laid down on 2 June of that year and launched on 21 May 1971. She was commissioned on 28 December 1973, under the command of Captain 2nd rank Vladimir Yerisov.

=== 1970s ===
The ship was assigned to the 201st Anti-Submarine Warfare Brigade of the Pacific Fleet's 10th (Pacific) Operational Squadron on 7 February 1974, and began the voyage from Baltiysk to the fleet at Vladivostok after the completion of sea trials in the Baltic. During the voyage, Admiral Oktyabrsky visited Berbera, Somalia between 17 and 30 June before rendezvousing with the Black Sea Fleet helicopter carrier Leningrad and the destroyer Skory at Cape Guardafui, then went on to visit Aden, Yemen, between 6 and 23 August and Colombo, Sri Lanka, between 3 and 10 October. In April 1975 it became the first ship in the Pacific Fleet to test fire the Metel anti-ship complex.

Admiral Oktyabrsky operated in the Indian Ocean with her sister ship Vasily Chapayev in 1977. As part of a search group with the destroyers Gordyy and Strogy, she participated in the Piton anti-submarine exercise in the Philippine Sea between 14 April and 15 May 1977, during which she was claimed to have detected seven United States nuclear submarines, following one to the territorial waters of Guam. The cruiser returned to the Indian Ocean in 1978, and on 7 April participated in Pacific Fleet exercises with her sister Marshal Voroshilov, the destroyer Sposobny, the frigate Razyashchiy, and the missile cruiser Vladivostok, observed by General Secretary of the Communist Party of the Soviet Union Leonid Brezhnev and Defense Minister Dmitry Ustinov from the cruiser Admiral Senyavin. Admiral Oktyabrsky was in Dalzavod shipyard for routine repairs between 15 August 1978 and 17 December 1979.

=== 1980s and end of service ===
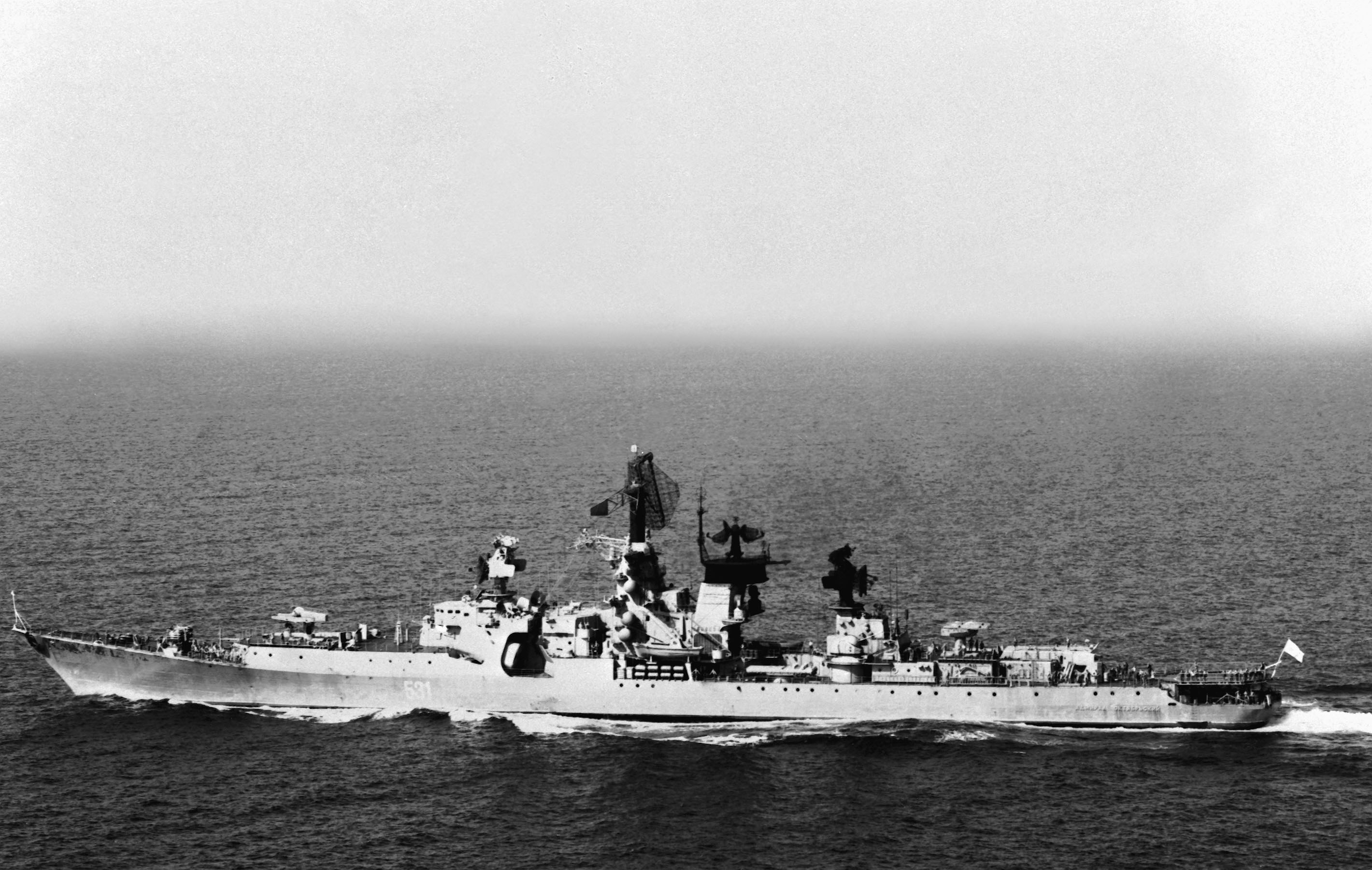
Admiral Oktyabrsky underway, September 1990

She operated in the Indian Ocean during 1980, visiting Tamrida, on Socotra Island, as part of a detachment of the 8th (Indian Ocean) Operational Squadron with the missile cruiser Admiral Fokin, and the frigate Storozhevoy under the flag of Kontr-Admiral Mikhail Khronopulo between 10 and 11 May. Between 20 and 30 May she visited Dahlak off the coast of Eritrea and Aden. After returning to Vladivostok, Admiral Oktyabrsky was refitted at Dalzavod between 19 December 1982 and 10 October 1986, receiving replacement turbines and boilers, updated Rastrub-B missiles for her Metel, the Shlyuz satellite navigation system and the Tsunami-BM satellite communications system. Between August 1990 and February 1991 she operated in the Persian Gulf during the Gulf War, as part of efforts to protect merchant ships that began following Iranian attacks on Soviet merchant vessels towards the end of the Iran–Iraq War.

After the dissolution of the Soviet Union at the end of 1991 the cruiser was transferred to the Russian Navy. Her career in the latter was brief, as she was decommissioned on 30 June 1993 due to the deterioration of the ship and lack of funds for repair, and the hull was transferred to an underwater engineering detachment, to be sold for scrap. The crew of the ship was disbanded on 10 March 1994.

During her career, Admiral Oktyabrsky was assigned the temporary tactical numbers 585, 225 (in 1975), 283, 138 (in 1976), 561, 564, 595, and 531.
