= Voroshilov (disambiguation) =

Kliment Voroshilov (1881–1969) was a prominent Soviet military officer and politician.

Voroshilov may also refer to:

- Voroshilov (surname)
- Voroshilov, former name of Ussuriysk, Primorsky Krai, Russia
- Kliment Voroshilov tank, a Soviet tank series
- Soviet cruiser Voroshilov, a Kirov class cruiser
- Soviet cruiser Marshal Voroshilov, a Kresta II-class cruiser

== See also ==
- Voroshilovsky (disambiguation)
