= Soviet cruiser Marshal Voroshilov =

Soviet Kresta II-class cruiser

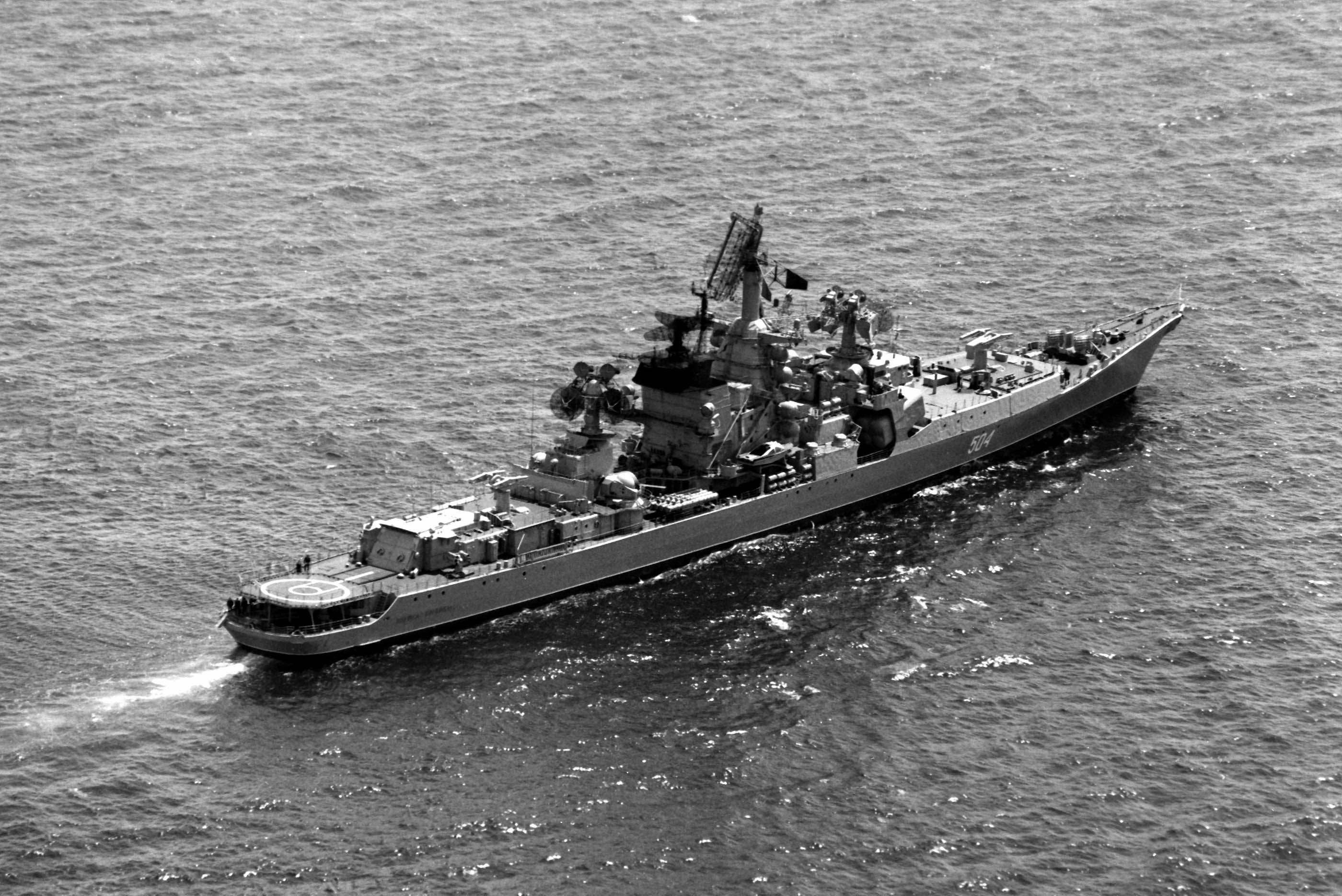
- Marshal Voroshilov, c. 1990

History

→ Soviet Union → Russia
- Name: Marshal Voroshilov
- Namesake: Kliment Voroshilov
- Builder: Zhdanov Shipyard
- Laid down: 20 March 1970
- Launched: 8 October 1970
- Commissioned: 15 September 1973
- Decommissioned: 29 October 1992
- Renamed: Khabarovsk, 1991
- Fate: Scrapped, after August 1994

General characteristics
- Class & type: Kresta II-class cruiser
- Displacement: 5,640 t (5,551 long tons) (standard); 7,575 t (7,455 long tons) (full load)
- Length: 156.5 m (513 ft 5 in) (o/a)
- Beam: 17.2 m (56 ft 5 in)
- Draught: 5.96 m (19 ft 7 in)
- Installed power: 4 × boilers; 91,000 shp (68,000 kW)
- Propulsion: 2 × shafts; 2 x steam turbines
- Speed: 34 kn (63 km/h; 39 mph)
- Range: 5,200 nmi (9,600 km; 6,000 mi) at 18 knots (33 km/h; 21 mph)
- Complement: 343
- Sensors & processing systems: Radar; Volga; MR-600 Voskhod; MR-310U Angara M; 2 x 4R60 Grom; 2 x MR-103 Bars; 2 x MR-123 Vympel; Sonar; MG-332T Titan-2T
- Armament: 2 × quadruple Metel Anti-Ship Complex anti-submarine missiles; 2 × twin M-11 Shtorm surface-to-air missile launchers (48 missiles); 2 × twin 57 mm (2.2 in) AK-725 dual purpose guns; 4 × sextuple 30 mm (1.2 in) AK-630 CIWS; 2 × quintuple 533 mm (21.0 in) torpedo tubes
- Aircraft carried: 1 Kamov Ka-25 'Hormone-A'
- Aviation facilities: Helicopter deck and hangar

Marshal Voroshilov (Russian: Маршал Ворошилов) was a Project 1134A Berkut A (NATO reporting name Kresta II) class cruiser of the Soviet Navy, which briefly became part of the Russian Navy after being renamed Khabarovsk in 1991. The fifth ship of her class, the ship served mostly during the Cold War, from 1973 to 1992.

She served with the Pacific Fleet for the duration of her career, often operating in the Indian Ocean and the Pacific in order to show the flag. Marshal Voroshilov cruised in the Indian and Pacific Oceans during 1974, 1975, and 1976, spending several months under refit in 1977 before undertaking another Indian Ocean cruise between 1979 and 1980. Again refitted between 1980 and 1986, she operated in the South China Sea in 1989. She was decommissioned in 1992 due to deteriorating conditions which reduced naval funding prevented from being addressed before being scrapped in 1994 after a fire broke out.

== Design ==
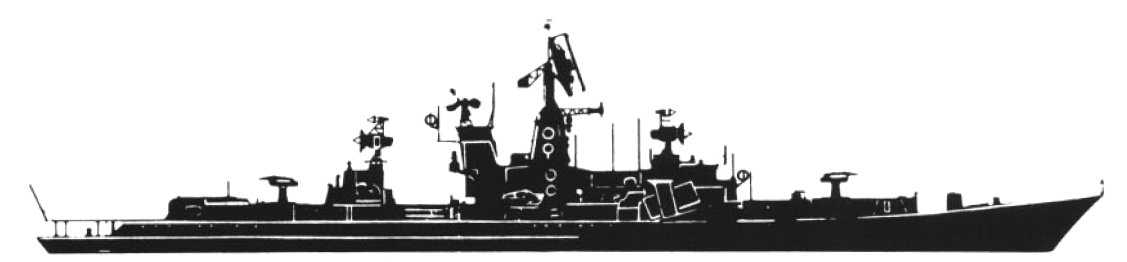
A United States Navy-produced profile drawing of a Kresta II-class cruiser

Marshal Voroshilov was the fifth ship of her class of ten Project 1134A Berkut A (NATO reporting name Kresta II-class) cruisers, designed by Vasily Anikeyev during the Cold War. The vessels were designated as Large Anti-Submarine Ships and were initially designed with a primary mission of countering NATO ballistic missile submarines, particularly the United States Navy's fleet of Polaris-equipped submarines. Before construction began, Admiral Sergey Gorshkov, commander-in-chief of the Soviet Navy, changed the role of the ships to that of destroying NATO attack submarines to allow Soviet Yankee-class ballistic missile submarines to reach the central Atlantic and Pacific, from which the latter could launch their comparatively short-ranged missiles against targets in the United States.

The Kresta II-class cruisers were 156.5 metres (513 ft 5 in) long with a beam of 17.2 m (56 ft 5 in) and a draught of 5.96 m (19 ft 7 in). She displaced 5,640 tonnes (5,551 long tons) standard and 7,575 tonnes (7,455 long tons) full load, and had a complement of 343 officers and men. The ship was equipped with a hangar aft to carry a single Kamov Ka-25 Hormone-A helicopter.

Marshal Voroshilov was propelled by two TV-12 geared steam turbines, each driving one propeller, powered by four high-pressure boilers, which created 91,000 shaft horsepower (68,000 kilowatts), giving her a maximum speed of 34 knots (63 km/h; 39 mph). She had a range of 5,200 nautical miles (9,600 kilometres; 6,000 miles) at 18 kn (33 km/h; 21 mph) and 1,755 nmi (3,250 km; 2,020 mi) at 32 kn (59 km/h; 37 mph).

=== Armament ===
For her primary role as an anti-submarine cruiser, Marshal Voroshilov mounted two quadruple launchers, one on each side of the bridge, for eight anti-submarine missiles in the Metel anti-ship complex (NATO reporting name SS-N-14 Silex). She was also equipped with two stern 12-barrel RBU-6000 and two forward 6-barrel RBU-1000 anti-submarine rocket launchers. The Ka-25 helicopter embarked on the cruiser was also capable of aiding in the search for and destruction of submarines.

Marshal Voroshilov was armed with a total of four AK-725 57-millimetre (2.2 in) dual-purpose guns in two twin mountings (one on either side aft of the funnel), to protect against surface and aerial threats. She also had four 30-millimetre (1.2 in) AK-630 close-in weapon system mountings (two each on a deckhouse between bridge and foremast on either side of the ship), and was armed with two twin launchers – one forward of the bridge and the other forward of the hangar – for the 48 V-611 surface-to-air missiles carried in the M-11 Shtorm system (NATO reporting name SA-N-3 Goblet). She had two quintuple mountings for 533-millimetre (21.0 in) dual-role torpedoes aft of the funnel.

=== Electronics warfare ===
Marshal Voroshilov was equipped with the MR-600 Voskhod (NATO code name Top Sail) early-warning radar, the MR-310U Angara-M (NATO code name Head Net C) search radar, and the Volga (NATO code names Don Kay and Don-2) navigational radar. For anti-submarine warfare she had an improved MG-332T Titan-2T hull-mounted sonar. She mounted two Grom fire-control systems for the Shtorm and two MR-103 Bars systems for the AK-725s. Marshal Voroshilov also had a MG-26 communications outfit. Marshal Voroshilov was the first ship of her class completed with the MR-123 Vympel fire control radar for the AK-630, as the first four ships had not received it.

Her electronic warfare equipment included the MRP-15-16 Zaliv and two sets each of the MRP-11-12 and MRP-13-14 direction finding systems, as well as the MRP-150 Gurzuf A and MRP-152 Gurzuf B radar jamming devices.

== Construction and service ==
On 7 March 1970, Marshal Voroshilov, named for Soviet military commander Kliment Voroshilov, was added to the list of ships of the Soviet Navy. Built-in the Zhdanov Shipyard, Leningrad with the serial number 725, the cruiser was laid down on 20 March of that year and launched on 8 October. The new ship was given the Red Banner naval flag flown by the World War II cruiser Voroshilov on 3 October 1972. She was commissioned on 15 September 1973, under the command of Captain 2nd rank Alexander Kosov.

=== 1970s ===
Marshal Voroshilov was relocated to Baltiysk in preparation for its voyage to the Pacific Fleet at Vladivostok after the completion of sea trials in the Baltic during late 1973. While passing through the English Channel, it was shadowed by Royal Navy ships and extensively photographed; the first time a Kresta II-class cruiser had been spotted in Western waters. During the voyage, it visited Port Louis, Mauritius with the tanker Grozny between 2 and 8 March 1974, then Malabo, Equatorial Guinea and Berbera, Somalia between 3 and 17 April. Following the ship's arrival in the Far East, it was assigned to the 201st Anti-Submarine Warfare Brigade of the fleet's 10th Operational Squadron on 11 June, based at Zolotoy Rog on the Sea of Japan. She operated in the Indian Ocean in 1975 and 1976 and was under routine repair at the Dalzavod shipyard in Vladivostok between 30 March and 25 December 1977. During the winter of 1977–1978, the cruiser participated in a rescue operation for three Riga-class frigates of the Sakhalin Flotilla during severe storms in the northern Sea of Japan, which damaged the stern Shtorm launcher and forward Volga navigational radar. With sister Kresta II-class cruiser Admiral Oktyabrsky, destroyer Sposobny, frigate Razyashchiy, and the missile cruiser Vladivostok, she was involved in Pacific Fleet maneuvers on 7 April 1978, observed by General Secretary of the Communist Party of the Soviet Union Leonid Brezhnev and Defense Minister Dmitry Ustinov from the cruiser Admiral Senyavin.

Under the command of Captain 2nd rank Georgy Ilyin, Marshal Voroshilov began an Indian Ocean cruise on 7 July 1979, and rendezvoused with Vladivostok on 25 July at Socotra, Yemen. She visited Victoria, Seychelles on 25 August, Massawa, Eritrea on 30 September, and Maputo, Mozambique on 28 October. Captain 3rd rank Vasily Floryak took command on 7 November after Ilyin was injured in a car accident in Maputo and evacuated by plane to the Soviet Union. Continuing her cruise with another visit to Victoria on 8 December, she shadowed a United States Navy carrier group led by USS Nimitz in the Strait of Hormuz between 27 December and 28 January 1980. Marshal Voroshilov visited Colombo, Sri Lanka on 20 February before returning to Vladivostok on 14 March.

=== 1980s and end of service ===
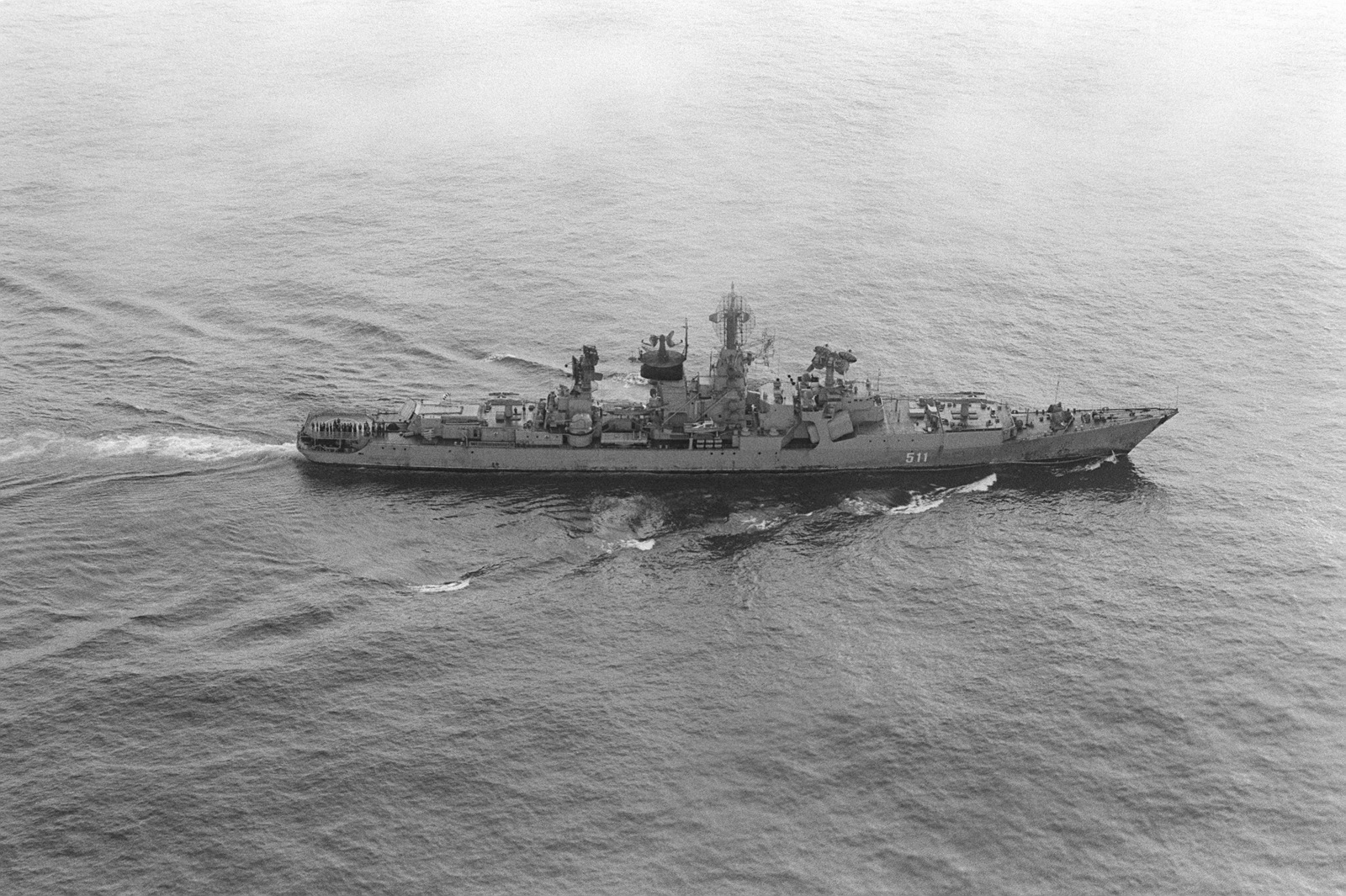
Marshal Voroshilov operating in the Central Pacific, 1980s

The cruiser was refitted at Dalzavod between November 1980 and March 1986, and won the Commander-in-Chief of the Navy's prize for anti-submarine training results in 1986 and 1989. In April 1988, as part of a search group with the missile cruiser Tallinn, and the frigates Ryavnyy and Gordelivyy, in cooperation with the submarine K-436 and aircraft, she tracked a United States submarine and forced it to move away from the patrol area of the ballistic missile submarine K-479 in the Sea of Okhotsk as part of an anti-submarine exercise. The search group then carried out a search for Western submarines along the Kuril Ridge, discovering and tracking a foreign submarine on 21 April for eight hours and 37 minutes. Between August 1988 and April 1989, she operated in the South China Sea and the Indian Ocean, temporarily based at Cam Ranh, Vietnam. Marshal Voroshilov collided with the refrigerated cargo ship Gorets at the entrance to the Eastern Bosphorus on 20 November 1990.

The cruiser was renamed Khabarovsk after the city on 24 January 1991 as a result of declining Communist ideological influence. After the dissolution of the Soviet Union, the cruiser was transferred to the Russian Navy, though her career in the latter was brief, as she was placed in reserve on 3 July 1992. Khabarovsk was decommissioned on 29 October due to the deterioration of the ship and lack of funds for repair, and the hull was transferred to an underwater engineering detachment, intended to be sold for scrap. A large fire broke out aboard the ship on 23 August 1994, while it was moored at the Kalinin ferry, and continued until the next day, burning out much of the interior spaces of the ship and leaving it with a pronounced list to port due to the amount of firefighting water pumped in; the hull was subsequently scrapped there.

During her career, Marshal Voroshilov was assigned the temporary tactical numbers 597, 511, 555, 561, 563 (in 1982), 137, and 504 (in 1990).
