= Soviet destroyer Sposobny (1970) =

Soviet destroyer

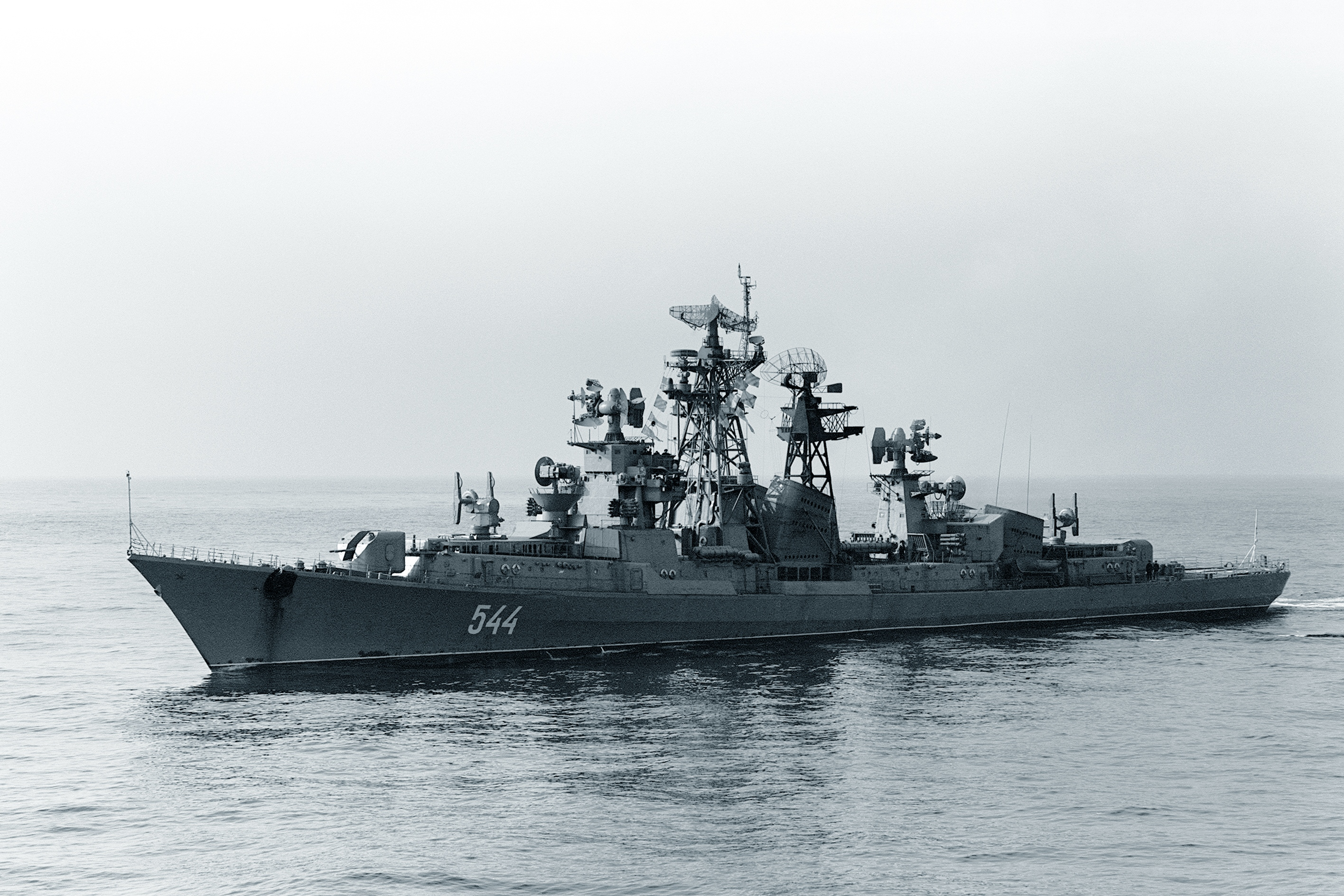
- Sposobny underway in the Sea of Japan, early 1982

History

→ Soviet Union → Russia
- Name: Sposobny
- Builder: 61 Communards Shipyard
- Laid down: 10 March 1969
- Launched: 11 April 1970
- Commissioned: 25 September 1971
- Decommissioned: 6 January 1993
- Fate: Scrapped in 1995

General characteristics
- Class & type: Kashin-class destroyer
- Displacement: 3,440 t (3,386 long tons) (standard); 4,290 t (4,222 long tons) (full load)
- Length: 144 m (472 ft) (o/a)
- Beam: 15.8 m (52 ft)
- Draught: 4.46 m (14.6 ft)
- Installed power: 4 × M8E gas turbines M3 unit aggregate; 72,000 hp (54,000 kW)
- Propulsion: 2 x shaft CODAG
- Speed: 34 kn (63 km/h; 39 mph)
- Range: 3,500 nmi (6,500 km; 4,000 mi) at 18 knots (33 km/h; 21 mph)
- Complement: 266
- Sensors & processing systems: Radar; Volga; MR-600 Voskhod; MR-310 Angara; MR-500U Kliver; 2 x Yatagan; 2 x MR-105 Turel; Groza; Sonar; MG-312 Titan; MG-311 Vychegda
- Armament: 2 × twin 76 mm (3 in) AK-726 guns; 2 × twin launchers for SA-N-1 'Goa' SAM (32 missiles); 1 × 5 533 mm (21 in) torpedo tubes; 2 × twelve barrel RBU-6000 ASW rocket launchers; 2 × six barrel RBU-1000 ASW rocket launchers

Sposobny (Russian: Способный, "Capable") was a Project 61 (NATO reporting name Kashin-class) destroyer of the Soviet Navy, which briefly became part of the Russian Navy. The ship served during the Cold War from 1971 to 1989.

She served with the Pacific Fleet for the duration of her career, often operating in the Indian Ocean and the Pacific in order to show the flag. Sposobny cruised in the Indian and the Pacific Oceans during 1973–1974, 1983, and 1985, punctuated by a 1976 goodwill visit to Vancouver, Canada, and active support to Vietnam during the 1979 Sino-Vietnamese War. A planned modernization in 1987 at the Sevastopol Marine Plant in Ukraine was never completed due to the fall of the Soviet Union and she was transferred to the Russian Navy despite a failed Ukrainian attempt to take control. Sold to the shipyard to pay off debts, the destroyer was decommissioned in 1993 before being sold for scrap two years later.

== Design ==
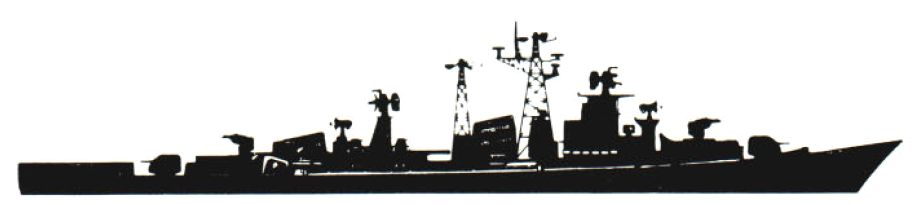
A United States Navy-produced profile drawing of a Kashin-class destroyer

Sposobny was one of the second series of her class of twenty Soviet Designation Project 61 Berkut A (NATO reporting name Kashin-class) destroyers. The vessels were initially designated as guard ships, but in 1966 were reclassified as Large Anti-Submarine Ships. All surviving ships, including Sposobny, were again reclassified as guard ships in January 1992. The class was built to replace the Kotlin-class destroyer and Riga-class frigate, which had been rendered obsolete by the advent of guided missiles. It was designed to defend larger warships and transports against low-flying aircraft, cruise missiles, and submarines, though the anti-submarine role ultimately became secondary to its air defense mission. They were the first class of Soviet warships designed to survive a nuclear explosion, and as a result had the main ship control station on the lower deck deep in the hull, separate from the enclosed bridge.

The Kashin-class destroyers were 144 meters (472 ft) long with a beam of 15.8 meters (52 ft) and a draught of 4.46 meters (14.6 ft). Sposobny displaced 3,440 tonnes (3,386 long tons) standard and 4,290 tonnes (4,222 long tons) full load, and had a complement of 266. The ship was equipped with a helicopter pad aft to carry a single Kamov Ka-25PL Hormone-A helicopter; the helicopter could only be temporarily aboard the ship due to the lack of a hangar.

Sposobny was propelled by two combined diesel and gas (CODAG) shafts powered by four M-3A gas turbines, which created 72,000 shp (54,000 kW), giving her a maximum speed of 34 knots (63 km/h; 39 mph); her class were the first Soviet warships equipped with gas turbines. She had a range of 3,500 nmi (6,500 km; 4,000 mi) at 18 kn (33 km/h; 21 mph) and 2,000 nmi (3,700 km; 2,300 mi) at 30 kn (56 km/h; 35 mph).

=== Armament ===
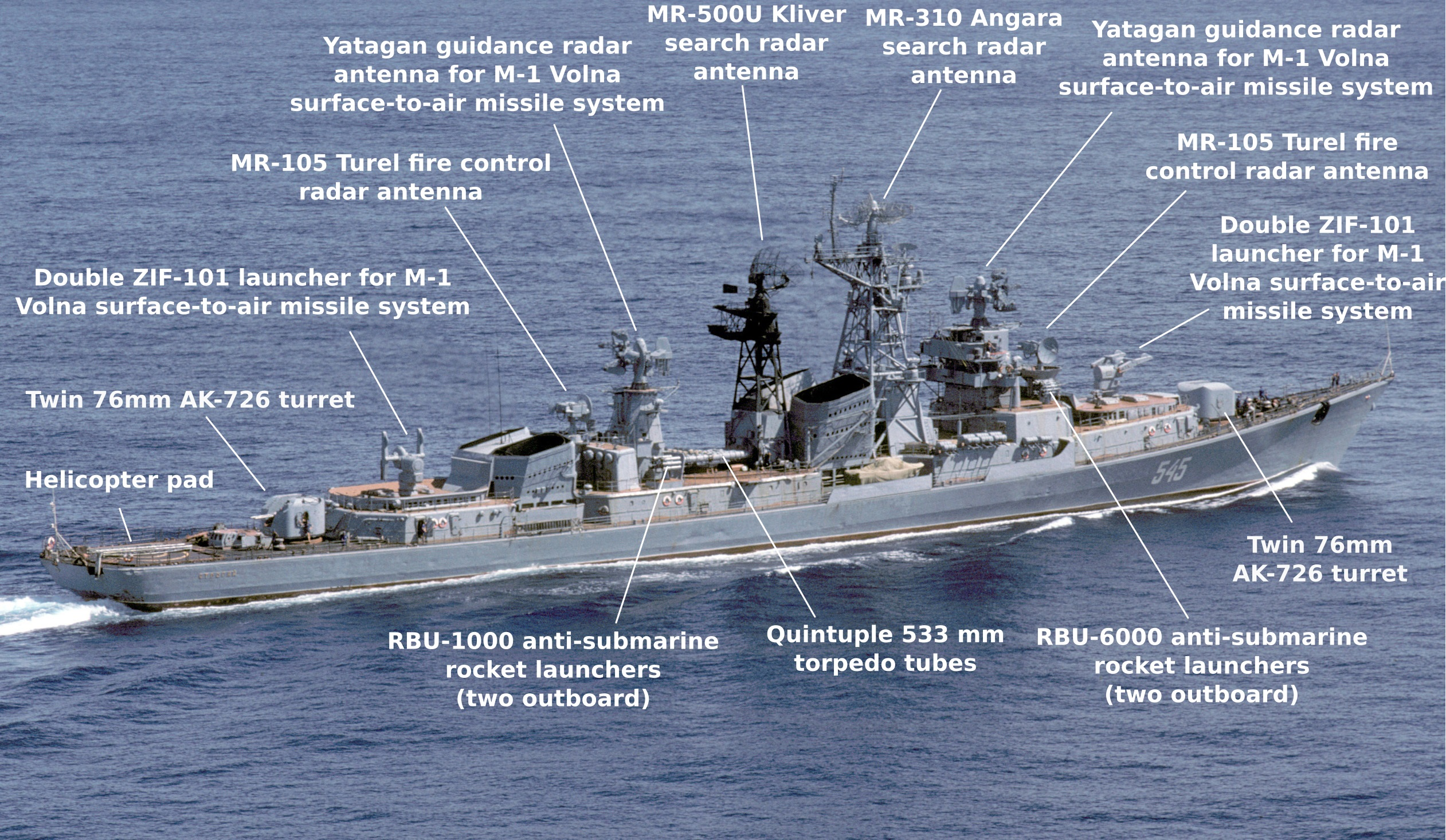
Location of fire control systems, search radars, and armament of sister ship Strogy

For her air defense role, she was equipped with two double ZIF-101 launchers with sixteen 4K90 missiles each for the M-1 Volna surface-to-air missile system (NATO reporting name SA-N-1 Goa), a navalised version of the S-125 Neva. Two double AK-726 76.2 mm guns protected against both aerial and surface threats. She was also equipped with two 12-barrel RBU-6000 and two 6-barrel RBU-1000 anti-submarine rocket launchers, and a quintuple mounting for 533-millimeter (21.0 in) dual-role torpedoes. The Ka-25 helicopter that could be landed on the destroyer was also capable of aiding in the search and destruction of submarines.

=== Sensors and electronic warfare ===
As a ship of the second series of her class, Sposobny was equipped with more advanced sensors. Instead of the two MR-300 search radars of the first series, she received an MR-310 Angara on her foremast and an MR-500U Kliver on the mainmast. She differed from the earlier members of her series in being equipped with two more advanced Volga navigational radars on the foremast instead of a single Don radar. The destroyer was equipped with MG-312 Titan and MG-311 Vychegda sonar.

For fire control, Sposobny received the Yatagan guidance radar for her Volna, the Turel for her AK-726, and the Groza for her torpedoes. Sposobny also had a MG-26 communications outfit, a Triton transceiver, the MPP-315 remote indicator for her Volga, and the Nikel-KM identification friend or foe system. For electronic warfare she was equipped with the MRP 13–14 direction finding system.

== Construction and service ==
Built in the 61 Communards Shipyard in Nikolayev with the serial number 1713, the destroyer was laid down on 10 March 1969, launched on 11 April 1970, and completed on 25 September 1971. Sposobny was added to the Navy List on 25 April 1970.

=== 1970s ===
Assigned to the Pacific Fleet on 27 October, she departed Sevastopol under the command of Captain 3rd rank G. Kudryavtsev on 15 February 1972. After passing the Cape of Good Hope she reached the Pacific Fleet base at Vladivostok on 26 August and joined the 175th Missile Ship Brigade of the fleet's 10th (Pacific) Operational Squadron. Between 17 and 24 December 1973, as part of a detachment of the fleet with command ship Admiral Senyavin and a Project 641 submarine, under the flag of First Deputy Commander of the Pacific Fleet Kontr-admiral Vladimir Maslov, the destroyer visited Port Louis, Mauritius. On the return voyage Admiral Senyavin and Sposobny visited Bombay between 9 and 15 February 1974.

As part of a fleet detachment with Udaloy-class destroyer Gnevny and the tanker Ilim under the flag of squadron commander Kontr-admiral Vladimir Varganov, she visited Vancouver, Canada from 25 to 30 August 1976, being open to public viewing. The visit was part of an exchange program that was reciprocated by the visit of Canadian warships to Leningrad later that year, although anti-whaling and anti-Soviet demonstrations were made against the ships; the visit was the first since 1944. With a detachment of warships and in cooperation with anti-submarine aircraft she participated in anti-submarine exercises on 26 August 1977. Alongside Admiral Senyavin, the cruisers Vasily Chapayev and Admiral Fokin, destroyers Strogy and Bozbuzhdenny, and the frigate Razyashchiy, she supported Vietnam during the Sino-Vietnamese War between February and March 1979. Operating in the South China Sea, the ships intercepted Chinese battlefield communications and passed them on to Vietnamese forces.

=== 1980s and end of service ===
Transferred to the 201st Anti-Submarine Warfare Brigade in 1982, Sposobny twice operated in the Sea of Japan that year, tracking American ships. Between 9 and 13 June 1983, with a fleet detachment of the 8th (Indian Ocean) Operational Squadron that also included the frigate Grozyashchiy and the tanker Pechenga under the flag of squadron commander Kontr-admiral Gennady Semyonov, she made an official visit to Colombo, Sri Lanka. The destroyer operated in the South China Sea and Indian Ocean in 1985, receiving an excellent rating for her performance.

On 16 July 1987, she was temporarily transferred to the Black Sea Fleet and on 30 July delivered to the Sevastopol Marine Plant for repairs and modernization as prototype for Project 01090 prior to transfer to the Northern Fleet. As the work began, the design for the modernization was changed to Project 01091. The modernization was to be completed by 30 September 1989, and differed only from the Project 01090 modernization of her sister ship Smetlivy in that she was to receive experimental nonacoustic submarine detection equipment instead of the Kaira sonar that Smetlivy was given. To provide space for the equipment the aft gun turret was to be removed and the complex was to be installed at the stern helicopter pad, with two sponsons for lowering towed antennas. The modernization was 70% complete by the fall of the Soviet Union.

Due to the fall of the Soviet Union, the modernization was not completed, and on 29 October 1992 the transfer to the Black Sea Fleet was made permanent. This followed an unsuccessful Ukrainian attempt to raise the Ukrainian flag over the ship on 3 July after the crew took the oath of allegiance to Ukraine; the ship remained under Russian control. She was removed from the Navy list on 6 January 1993, and to pay off the navy's debts to the shipyard she was transferred to the ownership of the Sevastopol Marine Plant. Relocated from the North Dock to Yuzhnaya Bay to remove weapons and equipment, she was stripped by 20 November, when the crew was disbanded and the ship became property of the plant. The hull was sold to an Indian company for scrapping and was towed away from Sevastopol on 2 April 1995.

During her career, Sposobny was assigned the temporary tactical numbers 522 (in 1971), 109 (in 1973), 547 (in 1982), 544 (in 1982), and 578 (in 1987).
