= Soviet frigate Razyashchiy =

Krivak-class frigate

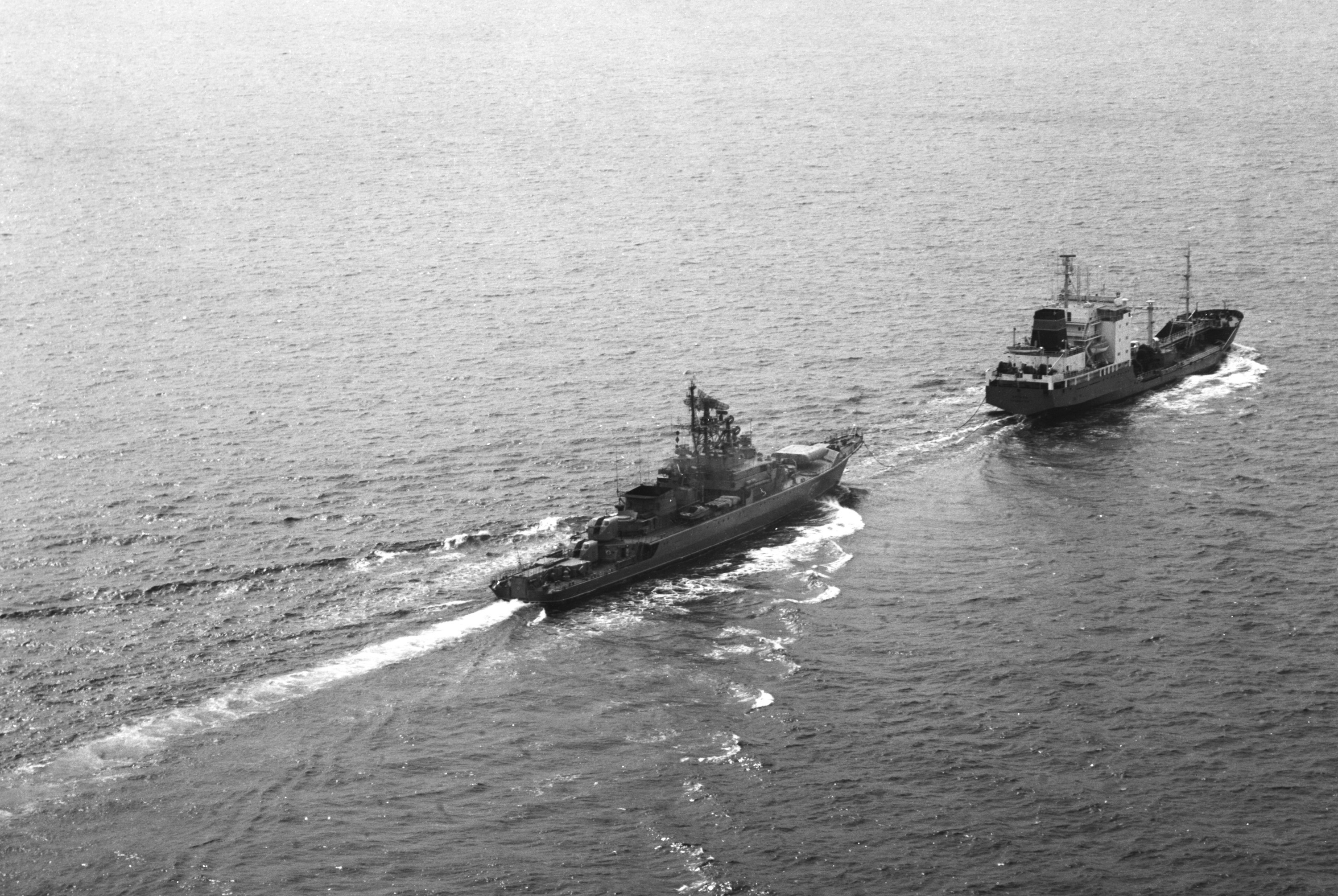
- Razyashchiy undergoing replenishment while at sea on 1 January 1985

History

Soviet Union
- Name: Razyashchiy
- Namesake: Russian for Striking
- Builder: Yantar Shipyard, Kaliningrad
- Yard number: 157
- Laid down: 28 September 1972
- Launched: 22 July 1974
- Commissioned: 30 December 1974
- Decommissioned: 29 October 1992
- Fate: Sold to a South Korean company to be Broken up

General characteristics
- Class & type: Project 1135 Burevestnik frigate
- Displacement: 2,810 t (2,770 long tons; 3,100 short tons) (standard); 3,200 t (3,100 long tons; 3,500 short tons) (full load)
- Length: 123 m (403 ft 7 in)
- Beam: 14.2 m (46 ft 7 in)
- Draft: 4.5 m (14 ft 9 in)
- Installed power: 48,000 shp (36,000 kW)
- Propulsion: 4 gas turbines; COGAG; 2 shafts
- Speed: 32 knots (59 km/h; 37 mph)
- Range: 3,950 nmi (7,315 km; 4,546 mi) at 14 knots (26 km/h; 16 mph)
- Complement: 23 officers, 174 ratings
- Sensors & processing systems: MR-310A Angara-A air/surface search radar; Volga and Don navigational radars; MG-332 Titan-2 and MG-325 Vega sonars
- Electronic warfare & decoys: PK-16 decoy-dispenser system
- Armament: 4 × URPK-3 Metel (SS-N-14 'Silex') anti-submarine missiles (1×4); 4 × ZIF-122 4K33 launchers (2×2) with 40 4K33 OSA-M (SA-N-4'Gecko') surface-to-air missiles; 4 × 76 mm (3 in) AK-726 guns (2×2); 2 × 45 mm (2 in) 21-KM guns (2×1); 2 × RBU-6000 Smerch-2 anti-submarine rockets; 8 × 533 mm (21 in) torpedo tubes (2×4); 18 mines

Razyashchiy (Russian: Разящий, "Striking") was a Project 1135 Burevestnik-class Large Anti-Submarine Ship (Большой Противолодочный Корабль, BPK) or Krivak-class frigate of the Soviet Navy. Displacing 3,200 tonnes (3,100 long tons; 3,500 short tons) full load, the vessel was built around the Metel anti-submarine missile system. Launched on 22 July 1974, Razyashchiy joined the Pacific Fleet of the Soviet Navy. While serving in the Arabian Sea, in 1983, Razyashchiy suffered minor hull damage from colliding with the destroyer USS Fife while approaching a US fleet. The ship also undertook visits to Port Louis, Mauritius, and Danang, Vietnam, to, among other objectives, enhance the relationships between these countries and the Soviet Union. In 1991, the vessel was transferred to the newly-formed Russian Navy. After nearly twenty years of service, however, Razyashchiy was in a poor state and so was decommissioned on 29 October 1992 and sold to be broken up on 6 October 1994.

== Design and development ==
Razyashchiy was one of twenty-one Project 1135 Burevestnik (Russian: Буревестник, "Petrel") class ships launched between 1970 and 1981. Project 1135 was envisaged by the Soviet Navy as a less expensive complement to the Project 1134A Berkut A (NATO reporting name 'Kresta II') and Project 1134B Berkut B (NATO reporting name 'Kara') classes of anti-submarine warfare ships, designated Large Anti-Submarine Ship (Большой Противолодочный Корабль, BPK). The design was originally given to the TsKB-340 design bureau of Zelenodolsk, which had created the earlier Project 159 (NATO reporting name 'Petya') and Project 35 (NATO reporting name 'Mirka') classes. However, the expansion in the United States Navy ballistic missile submarine fleet and the introduction of longer-ranged and more accurate submarine-launched ballistic missiles led to a review of the project to deal with this new threat. The work was transferred to TsKB-53, a design bureau in Leningrad that produced a substantially larger and more capable design created by N. P. Sobolov which combined a powerful missile armament with good seakeeping for a blue water role and shared the same BPK designation as the larger ships. This was amended to Guard Ship (Сторожевой Корабль, SKR) from 28 July 1977 to reflect the change in Soviet strategy of creating protected areas for friendly submarines close to the coast. NATO forces called the new class 'Krivak' class frigates.

Displacing 2,810 tonnes (2,770 long tons; 3,100 short tons) standard and 3,200 t (3,100 long tons; 3,500 short tons) full load, Razyashchiy was 123 m (404 ft) long overall, with a beam of 14.2 m (46 ft 7 in) and a draught of 4.5 m (14 ft 9 in). Power was provided by two 24,000 shp (18,000 kW) M7 power sets, each a combination of a 18,000-shaft-horsepower (13,000 kW) DK59 and a 6,000 shp (4,500 kW) M62 gas turbine linked in a COGAG arrangement and driving one fixed-pitch propeller. Design speed was 32 knots (59 km/h; 37 mph) and range was 3,950 nautical miles (7,315 km; 4,546 mi) at 14 knots (26 km/h; 16 mph). The ship’s complement was 197, including 23 officers.

Razyashchiy had a primary mission of anti-submarine warfare for which it was equipped with four URPK-3 Metel missiles (NATO reporting name SS-N-14 Silex), two quadruple torpedo tube mounts for 533 mm (21 in) torpedoes and a pair of 213 mm (8 in) RBU-6000 Smerch-2 anti-submarine rocket launchers. Defence against aircraft was provided by forty 4K33 OSA-M (SA-N-4 'Gecko') surface-to-air missiles which were launched from two sets of ZIF-122 launchers, each capable of launching two missiles. Two twin 76 mm (3 in) AK-726 guns were mounted aft and two single mounts for 45 mm (2 in) 21-KM guns were carried on the superstructure. Provision was made for carrying 18 mines.

Razyashchiy had a well-equipped sensor suite, including a single MR-310A Angara-A air/surface search radar, Volga and Don-2 navigation radars, MP-401S Start-S ESM radar system and Spectrum-F laser warning system. An extensive sonar complex was fitted, including MG-332 Titan-2, which was mounted in a bow radome, and MG-325 Vega. The latter was a towed-array sonar specifically developed for the class and had a range of up to 15 km (9.3 mi; 8.1 nmi). The ship was also equipped with the PK-16 decoy-dispenser system.

== Construction and career ==
Laid down at the Yantar Shipyard in Kaliningrad on 28 September 1972, Razyashchiy was the seventh of the class to be constructed by the shipbuilder, and was given the yard number 157. The vessel was named for a Russian word that can be translated to striking or smashing. Launched on 22 July 1974 and commissioned later the same year on 30 December, Razyashchiy joined the Pacific Fleet and was transferred to the naval base in Vladivostok. The ship undertook operations in the Indian and Pacific Oceans.

Between 10 and 17 November 1976, Razyashchiy visited Port Louis, Mauritius. On 7 April 1978, the ship participated in Pacific Fleet exercises with the missile cruisers, also known as BPK to the Soviet Navy, Admiral Oktyabrsky, Marshal Voroshilov and Vladivostok, and observed by General Secretary of the Communist Party of the Soviet Union Leonid Brezhnev and Defense Minister Dmitry Ustinov from the cruiser Admiral Senyavin. On 10 October 1981, the vessel arrived at the Vietnamese port of Danang, accompanying the cruiser Varyag. The sailors were greeted by members of the People's Army of Vietnam and local people. The ships stayed for four days, with the crews taking part in cultural activities. The aim of the visit was to foster better relationships between the two countries.

The ship returned to Vladivostok in November 1981 and docked at Dalzavod for repairs. When these were completed, in April 1983, Razyashchiy resumed service, travelling to the Arabian Sea. While operating there, on 17 November, the vessel approached a fleet of US Navy ships, led by the aircraft carrier USS Ranger. In response, the destroyer USS Fife manoeuvred to cut across the Soviet vessel's path and the two collided. Razyashchiy suffered minor hull damage.

Following the dissolution of the Soviet Union on 26 December 1991, the ship was to be transferred to the Russian Navy. However, service in this force was short-lived. Intensive operations over a prolonged duration had meant that much of the ship was in a poor state. Razyashchiy was decommissioned on 29 October 1992 and disarmed. On 6 October 1994, the vessel was sold to a South Korean business to be broken up.
