= Voroshilovsky (inhabited locality) =

Voroshilovsky (Russian: Вороши́ловский; masculine), Voroshilovskaya (Вороши́ловская; feminine), or Voroshilovskoye (Вороши́ловское; neuter) is the name of several rural localities in Russia:

- Voroshilovsky (rural locality), a settlement in Kopenkinskoye Rural Settlement of Rossoshansky District of Voronezh Oblast
- Voroshilovskoye, Russia, a village in Kaltovsky Selsoviet of Iglinsky District of the Republic of Bashkortostan
