= Voroshilovsky District, Russia =

Voroshilovsky District is the name of several districts in Russia. The districts are named for Kliment Voroshilov, a Soviet military commander and statesman.

== City divisions ==
- Voroshilovsky City District, Rostov-on-Don, a city district of Rostov-on-Don, the administrative center of Rostov Oblast
- Voroshilovsky City District, Volgograd, a city district of Volgograd, the administrative center of Volgograd Oblast
Cities in Russia with a city division called "Voroshilovsky"

== Renamed districts ==
- Voroshilovsky District, name of Usolsky District of Perm Oblast (now Perm Krai) in 1940–1957

== See also ==
- Voroshilovsky (disambiguation)
