= Soviet frigate Grozyashchiy =

Krivak-class frigate

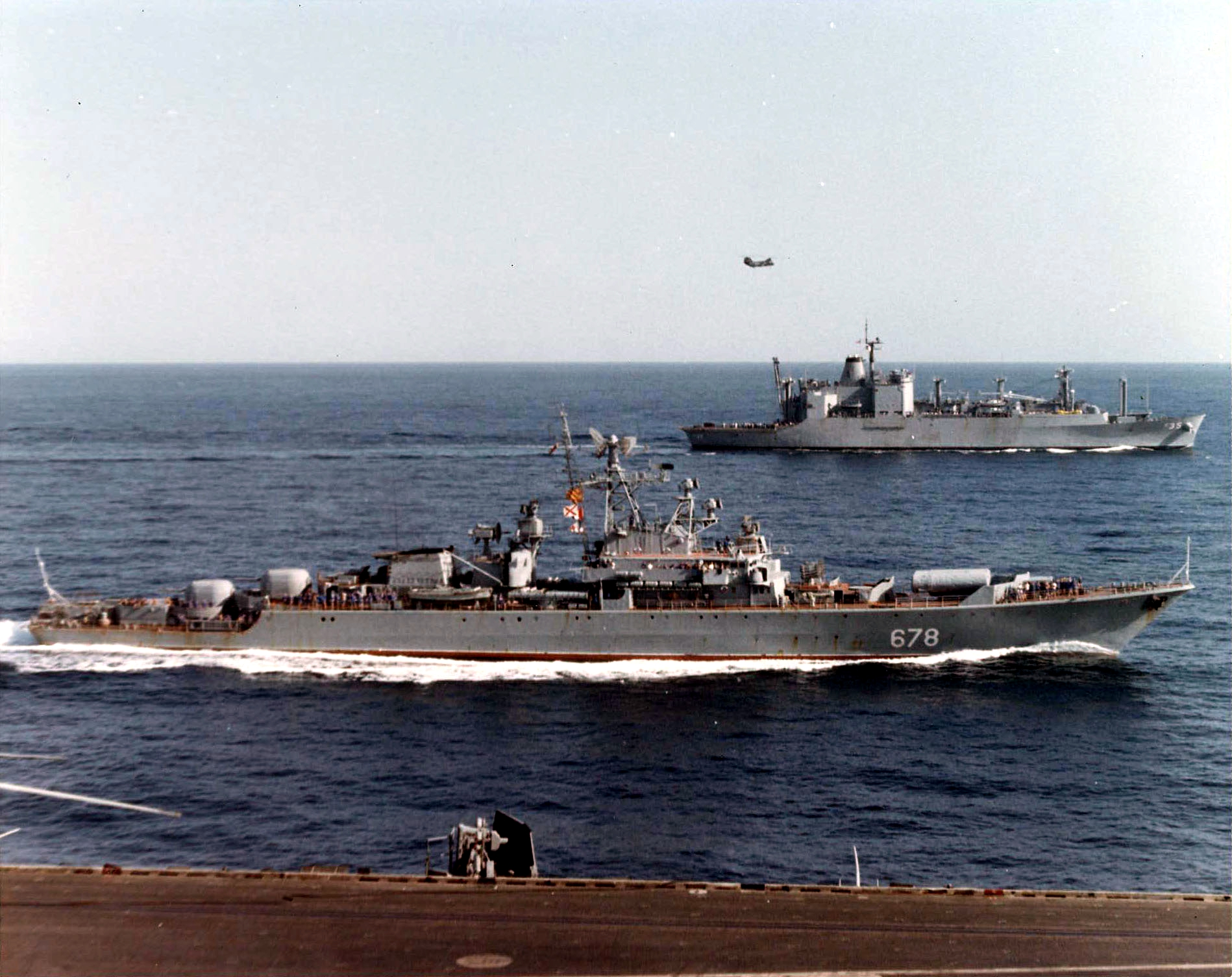
- Grozyashchiy underway c.1989

History

Soviet Union
- Name: Grozyashchiy
- Namesake: Russian for Threatening
- Builder: Yantar shipyard, Kaliningrad
- Yard number: 162
- Laid down: 4 May 1975
- Launched: 7 February 1977
- Commissioned: 30 September 1977
- Decommissioned: 13 February 1995
- Fate: Sold to be broken up

General characteristics
- Class & type: Project 1135M Burevestnik frigate
- Displacement: 2,935 t (2,889 long tons; 3,235 short tons) (standard); 3,305 t (3,253 long tons; 3,643 short tons) (full load)
- Length: 123 m (403 ft 7 in)
- Draft: 4.5 m (14 ft 9 in)
- Installed power: 44,000 shp (33,000 kW)
- Propulsion: 4 gas turbines; COGAG; 2 shafts
- Speed: 32 kn (59 km/h)
- Range: 3,900 nmi (7,223 km) at 14 kn (26 km/h)
- Complement: 23 officers, 171 ratings
- Sensors & processing systems: MR-310A Angara-A air/surface search radar; Don navigational radar; MR-143 Lev-214 fire control radar; MG-332T Titan-2T, MG-325 Vega, 2 MG-7 Braslet and MGS-400K sonars
- Electronic warfare & decoys: PK-16 decoy-dispenser system
- Armament: 4 × URPK-4 Metel (SS-N-14 'Silex') anti-submarine and anti-shipping missiles (1×4); 4 × ZIF-122 4K33 launchers (2×2) with 40 4K33 OSA-M (SA-N-4'Gecko') surface to air missiles; 2 × 100 mm (4 in) AK-100 guns (2×1); 2 × RBU-6000 Smerch-2 anti-submarine rockets; 8 × 533 mm (21 in) torpedo tubes (2×4)

Grozyashchiy or Grozyashchy (Russian: грозящий, "Threatening") was a 1135M Burevestnik-class (Russian: Буревестник, "Petrel") guard ship (Сторожевой Корабль, SKR), or frigate with the NATO reporting name 'Krivak-II', that served with the Soviet and Russian Navies. Launched on 7 February 1977, the vessel operated as part of the Pacific Fleet as an anti-submarine vessel, with an armament built around the Metel Anti-Ship Complex. Grozyashchiy undertook a number of visits to nations friendly to the Soviet Union, including Angola, Mauritius, Mozambique and Sri Lanka. The ship also formed part of the Soviet presence during the Sino-Vietnamese conflicts and visited Da Nang, Vietnam, in the October 1981. With the dissolution of the Soviet Union, Grozyashchiy joined the Russian fleet, but lack of funding meant that a planned repair in 1992 was not completed and instead the vessel was decommissioned on 13 February 1995 and sold to be broken up.

== Design and development ==
Grozyashchiy was one of eleven Project 1135M ships launched between 1975 and 1981. Project 1135, the Burevestnik (Russian: Буревестник, "Petrel") class, was envisaged by the Soviet Navy as a less expensive complement to the Project 1134A Berkut A (NATO reporting name 'Kresta II') and Project 1134B Berkut B (NATO reporting name 'Kara') classes of ships, which were designated Large Anti-Submarine Ship (Большой Противолодочный Корабль, BPK) by the Soviets. Project 1135M was an improvement developed in 1972 with slightly increased displacement and heavier guns. The design, by N. P. Sobolov, combined a powerful missile armament with good seakeeping for a blue water role. Originally designated BPK like the larger vessels, this was changed to guard ship (Сторожевой Корабль, SKR) in 1977 to reflect the Soviet strategy of creating protected areas for friendly submarines close to the coast and to reflect the substantially greater anti-ship capability compared to earlier members of the class through the introduction of new missiles. NATO forces called the vessels 'Krivak-II' class frigates.

Displacing 2,935 tonnes (2,889 long tons; 3,235 short tons) standard and 3,305 t (3,253 long tons; 3,643 short tons) full load, Grozyashchiy was 123 m (403 ft 7 in) long overall, with a beam of 14.2 m (46 ft 7 in) and a draught of 4.5 m (14 ft 9 in). Power was provided by two M7K sets, each consisting of a combination of a 17,000-shaft-horsepower (13,000 kW) DK59 and a 5,000 shp (3,700 kW) M62 gas turbine combined in a COGAG installation and driving one fixed-pitch propeller. Design speed was 32 knots (59 km/h; 37 mph) and range 3,900 nautical miles (7,223 km; 4,488 mi) at 14 kn (26 km/h; 16 mph). The ship's complement was 194, including 23 officers.

=== Armament and sensors ===
Grozyashchiy was designed for anti-submarine warfare around four URPK-4 Metel missiles (NATO reporting name SS-N-14 'Silex'), backed up by a pair of quadruple launchers for 533 mm (21 in) torpedoes and a pair of RBU-6000 213 mm (8 in) Smerch-2 anti-submarine rocket launchers. The Metel system was upgraded to URPK-5 Rastrub. Both the URPK-5 and the torpedoes had secondary anti-ship capabilities. Defence against aircraft was provided by forty 4K33 OSA-M (SA-N-4 'Gecko') surface to air missiles which were launched from twin-arm ZIF-122 launchers. Two 100 mm (4 in) AK-100 guns were mounted aft in a superfiring arrangement.

The ship had a well-equipped sensor suite, including a single MR-310A Angara-A air/surface search radar, Don navigation radar, the MP-401S Start-S ESM radar system and the Spectrum-F laser warning system. Fire control for the guns was provided by a MR-143 Lev-214 radar. An extensive sonar complex was fitted, including the bow-mounted MG-332T Titan-2T and the towed-array MG-325 Vega that had a range of up to 15 kilometres (9.3 mi). The vessel was also equipped with the PK-16 decoy-dispenser system which used chaff as a form of missile defense.

== Construction and career ==
Laid down by on 4 May 1975 with the yard number 162 at the Yantar Shipyard in Kaliningrad, Grozyashchiy was launched on 7 February 1977. The ship was the fourth of the class built at the yard. The ship was named for a Russian word that can be translated threatening, menacing or terrible. The vessel was commissioned on 30 September and was initially based at Sevastopol. On 24 February 1979, Grozyashchiy set off from the Black Sea to join the Pacific Fleet, calling at a number of port en route in nations that were friendly to the Soviet Union, including Luanda, Angola, and Maputo, Mozambique, on the African mainland and Port Louis in the island nation of Mauritius. The deployment formed part of a wider enlargement of the Soviet presence in Asia.

Arriving at Vladivostok on 3 July 1979, the ship was soon operating in the Indian Ocean and South China Sea. In addition to taking part in fleet manoeuvres, the crew continued to undertake diplomatic visits. Along with the Project 58 (NATO reporting name 'Kynda'-class) cruiser Varyag and other vessels, Grozyashchiy visited Da Nang, Vietnam, between 10 and 14 October 1981. This flotilla formed an important part of the Soviet presence to monitor the conflicts between China and Vietnam that continued to threaten peace in the region in the aftermath of the Sino-Vietnamese War. Between 9 and 13 June 1983, the ship joined the Project 61 (NATO reporting name 'Kashin'-class) destroyer Sposobny in visiting Colombo, Sri Lanka.

With the dissolution of the Soviet Union on 26 December 1991, Grozyashchiy was transferred to the Russian Navy. On 18 August the following year, the ship arrived at Dalzavod in Vladivostok for repair. However, a lack of funding meant that, instead, the vessel was decommissioned on 13 February 1995. Disarmament was complete by the end of the year and the remainder was sold in 1997 to a company in the United States to be broken up.
