= Voroshilovsky District =

Voroshilovsky District may refer to:

- Voroshilovsky District, Russia, name of several districts in Russia
- Voroshylovskyi District, a district of the city of Donetsk, Ukraine.
