= Voroshilovsky =

Voroshilovsky (masculine), Voroshilovskaya (feminine), or Voroshilovskoye (neuter) may refer to:

- Voroshilovsky District, name of several districts in the countries of the former Soviet Union
- Voroshilovsky (inhabited locality) (Voroshilovskaya, Voroshilovskoye), name of several rural localities in Russia
- Voroshilovskoye, former name of Alamudun, Kyrgyzstan
