= Soviet frigate Ryavnyy =

Krivak-class frigate

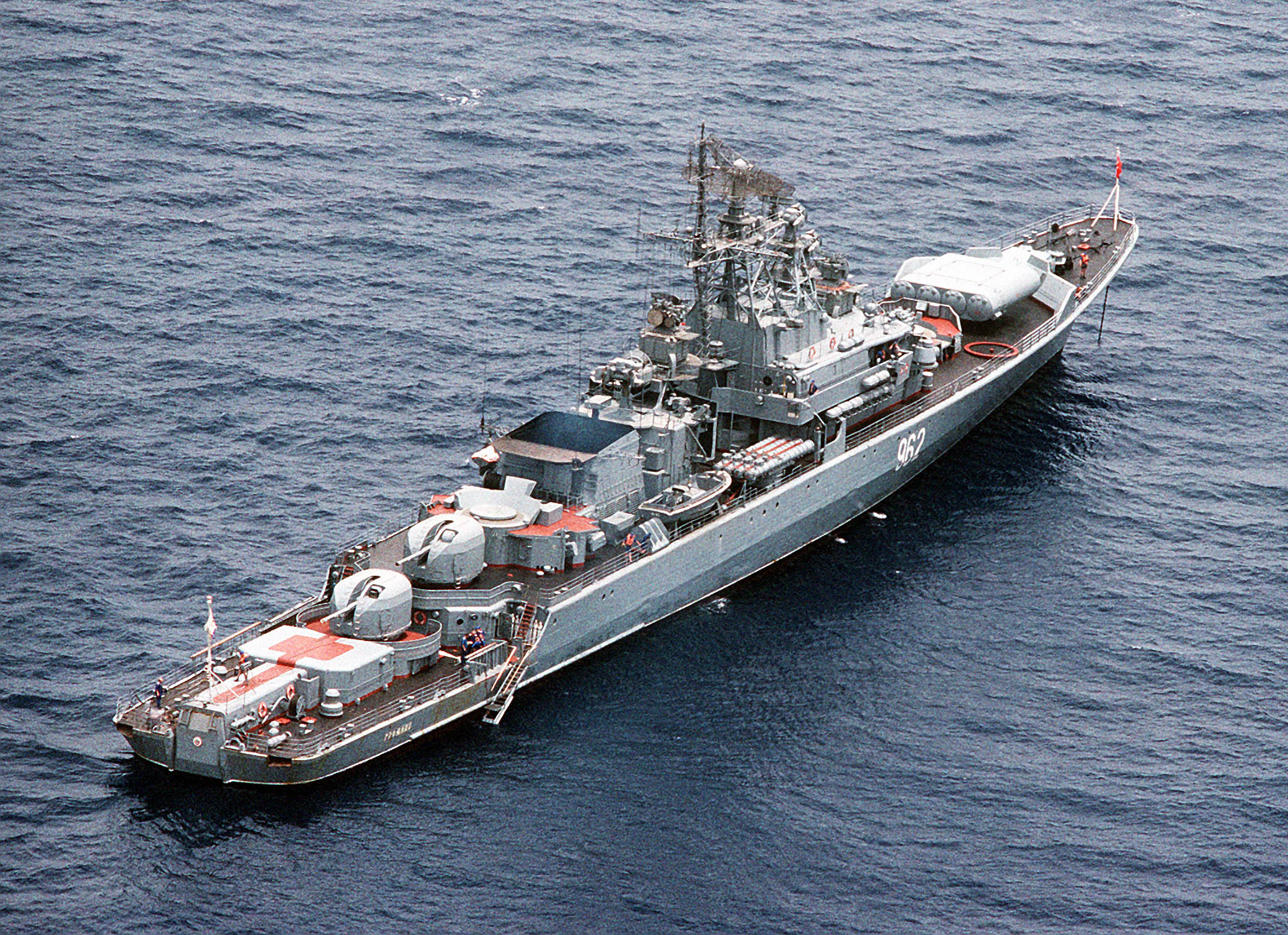
- Sister ship Gromkiy on 1 June 1988.

History

Soviet Union → Russia
- Name: Ryavnyy
- Namesake: Russian for Zealous
- Builder: Yantar shipyard, Kaliningrad
- Yard number: 167
- Laid down: 1 March 1978
- Launched: 1 March 1979
- Commissioned: 31 December 1979
- Decommissioned: 17 July 1997
- Fate: Sold to be broken up

General characteristics
- Class & type: Project 1135M Burevestnik frigate
- Displacement: 2,935 t (2,889 long tons; 3,235 short tons) (standard); 3,305 t (3,253 long tons; 3,643 short tons) (full load)
- Length: 123 m (403 ft 7 in)
- Draft: 4.5 m (14 ft 9 in)
- Propulsion: 4 gas turbines; COGAG; 2 shafts
- Speed: 32 kn (59 km/h)
- Range: 3,900 nmi (7,223 km) at 14 kn (26 km/h)
- Complement: 23 officers, 171 ratings
- Sensors & processing systems: MR-310A Angara-A air/surface search radar; Don navigational radar; MR-143 Lev-214 fire control radar; MG-332T Titan-2T, MG-325 Vega, 2 MG-7 Braslet and MGS-400K sonars
- Electronic warfare & decoys: PK-16 decoy-dispenser system
- Armament: 4 × URPK-5 Rastrub (SS-N-14 'Silex') anti-submarine and anti-shipping missiles (1×4); 4 × ZIF-122 4K33 launchers (2×2) with 40 4K33 OSA-M (SA-N-4'Gecko') surface to air missiles; 2 × 100 mm (4 in) AK-100 guns (2×1); 2 × RBU-6000 Smerch-2 anti-submarine rockets; 8 × 533 mm (21 in) torpedo tubes (2×4)

Ryavnyy (Russian: Рьяный, "Zealous") was a Project 1135M Burevestnik-class (Russian: Буревестник, "Petrel") Guard Ship (Сторожевой Корабль, SKR) or 'Krivak II' class frigate that served with the Soviet Navy. Launched on 1 September 1979, the vessel operated as part of the Pacific Fleet as an anti-submarine vessel, with an armament built around the Metel Anti-Ship Complex. Ryavnyy took part in operations in the Indian and Pacific Oceans and undertook visits to countries friendly to the Soviet Union. The ship spent time in the Seychelles and North Yemen in 1982 and North Korea in 1985 and 1986. Taken out of service for an overhaul in 1989, Ryavnyy was instead placed in reserve until 17 July 1997, when the ship was decommissioned and sold to be broken up.

== Design and development ==
Ryavnyy was one of eleven Project 1135M ships launched between 1975 and 1981. Project 1135, the Burevestnik (Russian: Буревестник, "Petrel") class, was envisaged by the Soviet Navy as a less expensive complement to the Project 1134A Berkut A (NATO reporting name 'Kresta II') and Project 1134B Berkut B (NATO reporting name 'Kara') classes of anti-submarine ships. Project 1135M was an improvement developed in 1972 with slightly increased displacement and heavier guns compared with the basic 1135. The design, by N. P. Sobolov, combined a powerful missile armament with good seakeeping for a blue water role. The ships were designated Guard Ship (Сторожевой Корабль, SKR) to reflect the Soviet strategy of creating protected areas for friendly submarines close to the coast and the substantially greater anti-ship capability compared to earlier members of the class. NATO forces called the vessels 'Krivak II' class frigates.

Displacing 2,935 tonnes (2,889 long tons; 3,235 short tons) standard and 3,305 t (3,253 long tons; 3,643 short tons) full load, Ryavnyy was 123 m (403 ft 7 in) long overall, with a beam of 14.2 m (46 ft 7 in) and a draught of 4.5 m (14 ft 9 in). Power was provided by two M7K power sets, each consisting of a combination of a 17,000-shaft-horsepower (13,000 kW) DK59 and a 5,000 shp (3,700 kW) M62 gas turbine arranged in a COGAG installation and driving one fixed-pitch propeller. Each set was capable of a maximum of 24,000 shp (18,000 kW). Design speed was 32 knots (59 km/h; 37 mph) and range 3,900 nautical miles (7,223 km; 4,488 mi) at 14 kn (26 km/h; 16 mph). The ship’s complement was 194, including 23 officers.

=== Armament and sensors ===
Ryavnyy was designed for anti-submarine warfare around four URPK-5 Rastrub missiles (NATO reporting name SS-N-14 'Silex'), backed up by a pair of quadruple launchers for 533 mm (21 in) torpedoes and a pair of RBU-6000 213 mm (8 in) Smerch-2 anti-submarine rocket launchers. The URPK-5 also had secondary anti-ship capabilities. Defence against aircraft was provided by forty 4K33 OSA-M (SA-N-4 'Gecko') surface to air missiles which were launched from two sets of ZIF-122 launchers, each capable of launching two missiles. Two 100 mm (4 in) AK-100 guns were mounted aft.

The ship had a well-equipped sensor suite, including a single MR-310A Angara-A air/surface search radar, Don navigation radar, the MP-401S Start-S ESM radar system and the Spectrum-F laser warning system. Fire control for the guns consisted of a MR-143 Lev-214 radar. An extensive sonar complex was fitted, including MG-332T Titan-2T, which was mounted in a bow radome, and MG-325 Vega. The latter was a towed-array sonar specifically developed for the class and had a range of up to 15 kilometres (9.3 mi). In addition to the PK-16 decoy-dispenser system, the vessel was equipped with an additional eight-tube decoy system aft specially developed for point-defence against missiles.

== Construction and career ==
Laid down by on 1 March 1978 with the yard number 167 at the Yantar Shipyard in Kaliningrad, Ryavnyy was launched on 1 September 1979. The ship was the antepenultimate of the class built at the yard. The ship was named for a Russian word that can be translated zealous. The vessel was commissioned on 31 December and was initially based at Baltiysk. At the time, the Soviet Union was extending its Asian presence, and expanding the Pacific Fleet with large combat vessels of comparable capability to the European fleets. Therefore Ryavnyy was allocated to the Pacific Fleet and set off from the Baltic Sea.

Ryavnyy operated in the Indian and Pacific Oceans, travelling as far as the Arabian Peninsula. The ship undertook a number of good will visits to countries that were friendly to the Soviet Union. On 8 May 1982, the ship arrived at Victoria, Seychelles, staying for four days. Between 1 and 5 August, the vessel was to be found at Al Hudaydah in what was then North Yemen. Three years later, between 13 and 17 August 1985, Ryavnyy visited Wonsan in North Korea, returning to the city a year later between 4 and 8 July. Wonson was at the time an increasingly important port for the Soviet Union and visits by naval vessels were crucial to retaining a good relationship between the countries.

However, soon afterwards, Ryavnyy was taken out of service. The ship was handed to Dalzavod in Vladivostok on 1 June 1989 for a medium overhaul, but never returned to active duty. Initially put in reserve, Ryavnyy was decommissioned on 17 July 1997 and sold to be broken up.
