= Soviet cruiser Vasily Chapayev =

Soviet Navy's Kresta II-class cruiser

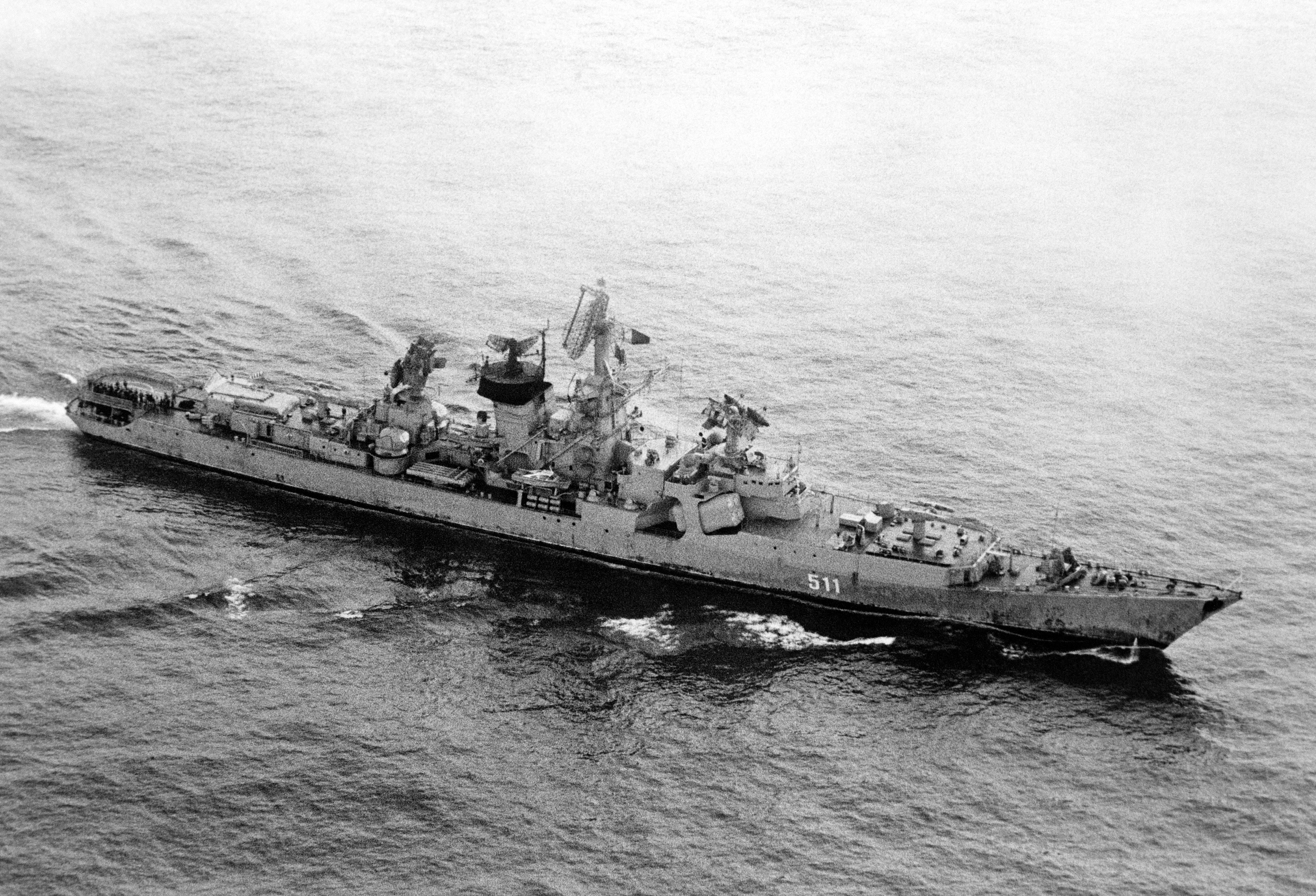
- Vasily Chapayev underway on 24 January 1983

History

Soviet Union
- Name: Vasily Chapayev
- Namesake: Vasily Chapayev
- Builder: Zhdanov Shipyard
- Laid down: 22 November 1973
- Launched: 28 November 1974
- Completed: 30 November 1976
- Stricken: 30 June 1993
- Fate: Broken up

General characteristics
- Class & type: Kresta II-class cruiser
- Displacement: 5,640 t (5,551 long tons) (standard); 7,575 t (7,455 long tons) (full load)
- Length: 156.5 m (513.5 ft) (o/a)
- Beam: 17.2 m (56.4 ft)
- Draught: 5.96 m (19.6 ft)
- Installed power: 4 × boilers; 91,000 shp (68,000 kW)
- Propulsion: 2 x steam turbines; 2 × shafts
- Speed: 34 knots (63 km/h; 39 mph)
- Range: 5,200 nmi (9,600 km; 6,000 mi) at 18 knots (33 km/h; 21 mph)
- Complement: 343
- Sensors & processing systems: Radar; MR-600 Voskhod early-warning radar; MR-310A Angara-A search radar; 2 x Volga navigational radars; 2 x 4R60 Grom, 2 x MR-103 Bars, 2 x MR-123 Vympel fire-control radars; Sonar; MG-332T Titan-2T
- Armament: 2 quad URPK-3 Metel anti-submarine systems (8 missiles); 2 twin M-11 Shtorm surface-to-air missile systems (48 missiles); 2 × twin 57 mm (2.2 in) AK-725 dual-purpose guns; 4 × sextuple 30 mm (1.2 in) AK-630 CIWS; 2 × quintuple 533 mm (21.0 in) torpedo tubes
- Aircraft carried: 1 Kamov Ka-25 'Hormone-A' helicopter
- Aviation facilities: Helicopter deck and hangar

Vasily Chapayev (Russian: Васи́лий Чапа́ев) was a Project 1134A Berkut A (NATO reporting name: 'Kresta II') class cruiser of the Soviet Navy named for the naval commander Vasily Chapayev. The Project 1134A vessels were envisaged as a counter to the attack and ballistic missile submarines operated by the members of NATO. To that end, they were equipped with two KT-106 quadruple launchers for eight 85R anti-submarine missiles in the URPK-3 Metel (NATO reporting name: SS-N-14 'Silex') system. The ninth ship of the class, Vasily Chapayev was launched in 1974 and served during the Cold War with the Pacific Fleet. Based at Vladivostok, the ship travelled extensively in the Indian and Pacific Oceans, visiting a large number of friendly ports in Angola, Ethiopia, India, Mozambique and Yemen. In 1978 and 1979, the vessel formed part of a Soviet flotilla, including the Project 68bis (NATO reporting name: 'Sverdlov'-class) cruiser Admiral Senyavin, that supported Vietnam in the aftermath of the Sino-Vietnamese War. In 1982, Vasily Chapayev was allocated to support the BOR-4 spaceplane programme, and two years later, the vessel participated in a search for a US Navy submarine that was suspected of being near the Kamchatka Peninsula in the Russian Far East. In 1985, the ship took part in a simulated joint operations attack on the US base at Pearl Harbor that involved the coordinated use of aircraft, ships and submarines. During the following year, the vessel took part in first joint exercises that involved both the Soviet and North Korean Navies. Taken out of active service in 1992, Vasily Chapayev was decommissioned and transferred to be broken up in 1993.

== Design and development ==
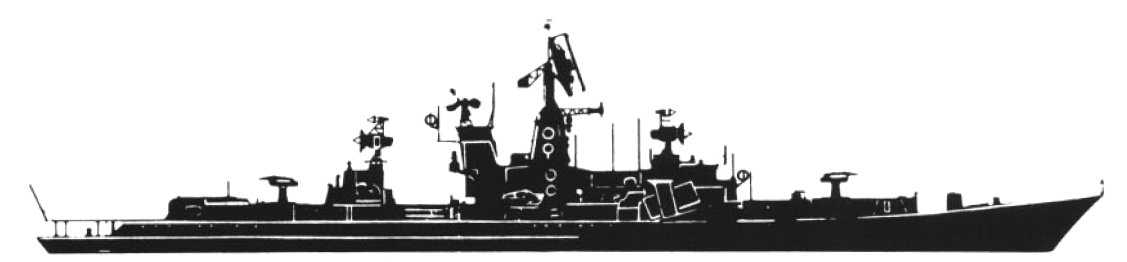
A United States Navy-produced profile drawing of a Kresta II-class cruiser

Vasily Chapayev was the ninth ship of the class of ten Project 1134A Berkut A (NATO reporting name: 'Kresta II'-class) ships that were designed by Vasily Anikeyev. The class were designed at the height of the Cold War when tensions between the Soviet Union and NATO were at their height. The size and capability of the vessels led to them being designated cruisers by NATO. They were designated by the Soviet Navy as large anti-submarine ships (Russian: Большой Противолодочный Корабль, BPK) in accordance with their primary mission of countering ballistic missile submarines operated by NATO members, particularly the US Navy fleet of Polaris-equipped submarines. However, before the ships began to be built, commander-in-chief of the Soviet Navy Admiral Sergey Gorshkov changed the role of the ships to that of being capable of destroying NATO attack submarines. This would allow Soviet Project 667A Navaga (NATO reporting name: 'Yankee'-class) ballistic missile submarines to reach the central Atlantic and Pacific to launch their comparatively short-ranged ballistic missiles against targets in the United States.

Vasily Chapayev was 156.5 metres (513.5 ft) long overall with a beam of 17.2 m (56.4 ft) and a draught of 5.96 m (19.6 ft). Displacement was 5,640 t (5,551 long tons) standard and 7,575 t (7,455 long tons) full load. The ship's complement was 343 officers and ratings. A hangar was fitted aft capable of handling a single Kamov Ka-25 (NATO reporting name: 'Hormone-A') helicopter. The ship was propelled by two TV-12-1 geared steam turbines each powered by four high-pressure boilers, with the forward engine room powering the port screw and the aft one the starboard screw. The ship's total power was 91,000 shaft horsepower (67,859 kW), giving a maximum speed of 34 knots (63 km/h; 39 mph). The ship carried a total of 1,830 t (1,801 long tons) of fuel oil to give a range of 5,200 nautical miles (9,630 km; 5,984 mi) at 18 kn (33 km/h; 21 mph) and 1,755 nautical miles (3,250 km; 2,020 mi) at 32 kn (59 km/h; 37 mph).

=== Armament ===
As the ship's primary role was as an anti-submarine warship, Vasily Chapayev mounted two KT-106 quadruple launchers for eight 85R anti-submarine missiles in the URPK-3 Metel system (NATO reporting name: SS-N-14 'Silex'). This was backed up by two stern RBU-6000 and two forward RBU-1000 rocket launchers, mounting 12 and six rockets each respectively, to protect against close-in threats. The Ka-25 helicopter embarked on the ship was also capable of aiding in the search and destruction of submarines, and as such it could carry depth charges and torpedoes. The 85R missiles could also be used against surface threats.

For defence against aerial threats, Vasily Chapayev was armed with the M-11 Shtorm system (NATO reporting name: SA-N-3 'Goblet'), which included two twin B-187A launchers, one forward of the bridge and the other forward of the hangar, for 48 V-611 (4K60) surface-to-air missiles in two barrel-shaped magazines of 24 missiles each. The vessel also had four 57 mm (2.2 in) AK-725 dual-purpose guns situated in two twin mountings, one on either side aft of the funnel to protect against surface and aerial threats. Although not envisaged in the original design, four [sextuple 30 mm (1.2 in) AK-630 close-in weapon systems were added during construction. Two quintuple PT-53-1134A mountings for 533 mm (21 in) torpedo tubes were also fitted aft of the funnel which could be used in both the anti-shipping and anti-submarine roles.

=== Sensors and electronics warfare ===
Vasily Chapayev was equipped with the MR-600 Voskhod (NATO reporting name: 'Top Sail') early-warning radar, supported by a MR-310A Angara-A (NATO reporting name: 'Head Net C') search radar, and two Volga (NATO reporting names: 'Don Kay' and 'Don-2') navigational radars. The MR-310A was an advanced system that could track up to 15 targets at a range of up to 40 km (25 mi). The improved MG-332T Titan-2T hull-mounted sonar was fitted in a bulbous radome for anti-submarine warfare. This was complemented by the radar, dipping sonar and sonobuoys that could be carried by the onboard helicopter. For fire-control purposes, the vessel had Grom-M for the surface-to-air missiles, MR-103 Bars for the AK-725 and MR-123 Vympel for the AK-630.

The ship's electronic warfare equipment included the MRP-15-16 Zaliv and two sets each of the MRP-11-12 and MRP-13-14 direction-finding systems, as well as the MRP-150 Gurzuf A and MRP-152 Gurzuf B radar-jamming devices. Vasily Chapayev was also fitted with a MG-26 communications outfit and a MG-35 Shtil passive sonar.

== Construction and career ==
=== Construction ===
Ordered on 11 June 1970 from the Zhdanov Shipyard, Vasily Chapayev was allocated the yard number 729. The ship was laid down on 22 November 1973 and launched on 28 November 1974. The vessel was named in honour of the Russian Civil War naval commander Vasily Chapayev. Completed on 30 November 1976 and Commissioned under the command of Captain 2nd Rank V. A. Sobgaida, the vessel was assigned to the Soviet Navy's Pacific Fleet.

=== 1970s ===
On entering service, Vasily Chapayev was ordered to sail on 24 December 1976 but the crew refused to comply. When the rebellion was assessed by the authorities, the senior officers were found culpable and removed. Captain 1st Rank A. A. Agadzhanov was transferred from Vladivostok to take command of the warship, which departed Leningrad in 1977 for the port that would be home for the rest of the ship's career. On 16 December 1977, the ship paid a visit to Bombay, staying until 21 December. On 31 March the following year, Vasily Chapayev was allocated to the 201st Brigade of the 10th Squadron of the Pacific Fleet based at Vladivostok. The vessel subsequently visited Aden in South Yemen, Cienfuegos and Havana in Cuba, and Luanda, Angola, to contribute to friendly relationships between the host countries and the Soviet Union. The ship arrived in Vladivostok the following year, the first major warship to join the Pacific Fleet in four years and seen by NATO as a demonstration of the increasing importance of the region to Soviet policy.

In June 1978, Vasily Chapayev joined a fleet of Soviet warships, including the Project 68bis (NATO reporting name: 'Sverdlov' class) cruiser Admiral Senyavin and the Project 58 (NATO reporting name: 'Kynda' class) cruiser Admiral Fokin, to sail to Vietnam to promote peace after the Sino-Vietnamese War. In February 1979, the vessels returned to support Vietnam during the border clashes with China that followed the conflict. The crew was honoured by the Soviet authorities for their service, with 36 receiving government commendations. The vessel returned to Vladivostok in March.

=== 1980s and end of service ===
In 1982, Vasily Chapayev was seconded to the search team under the Black Sea Fleet supporting the BOR-4 spaceplane, which was designed to splashdown in the Indian Ocean. The vessel spent the year visiting countries in and around the Indian Ocean to show the flag. Between 8 and 12 May 1982, the crew were hosted by Victoria, Seychelles. The ship travelled on to Ethiopia where short preventative maintenance repairs were performed, and then subsequently travelled to Maputo, Mozambique, and Socatra, Yemen, before returning to Vladivostok via Victoria and Vietnam. The ship underwent a more substantial overhaul in 1983.

On 28 September 1984, the ship left Vladivostok as part of a large fleet of Soviet vessels led by the Project 1143 Krechyet (NATO reporting name: 'Kiev' class) aircraft carrier Novorossiysk on a mission to search for a US Navy nuclear submarine reported off the coast of the Kamchatka Peninsula. Two days later, on 30 September, a radioactive signature consistent with a submarine was detected, and on 2 October the Soviet Project 877 Paltus (NATO reporting name: 'Kilo' class) class submarine B-404 identified a US submarine in the Kuril Strait in what was deemed by the Soviets to be sufficiently close to their territorial waters to be a potential threat. The submarine was subsequently tracked by air and sea until 5 October, but no contact was made between the belligerents and the event did not escalate into an international incident. The Project 1134B Berkut B (NATO reporting name: 'Kara' class) cruiser Nikolayev and Vasily Chapayev acted as motherships for the operation, and on 5 October refuelled the smaller vessels of the flotilla in Aniva Bay. The ships then called off the search and all returned to their home ports.

On 29 March 1985, Vasily Chapayev accompanied Nikolayev, Novorossiysk and a host of smaller vessels under the command of Vice-Admiral Rostislav Leonidovich Dymov for the Pacific Ocean to undertake a major exercise to test the joint operations capability within the Soviet armed forces. The fleet progressed to the coast of Hawaii, and proceeded to run a simulated attack on Pearl Harbor. The operation included coordination between vessels above and below the sea, and aircraft flying from the aircraft carrier. The outcome of the test proved to the Soviet military leadership the value of co-ordinated attacks by aircraft, ships and submarines using long-range cruise missiles. The fleet then proceeded to the Philippine Sea and undertook anti-submarine operations to identify the US Navy ballistic missile submarines that operated in the area. September found the vessel off the coast of Vietnam undertaking further weapon tests. The voyage was considered a success.

Between 15 and 17 October 1986, the ship was involved in the first joint exercise between the Soviet Union and the Korean People's Navy, simulating an amphibious attack on Rason. This was a time of heightened belligerent activity by North Korea and a peak of violations of the fragile peace between the country and South Korea, with ten times as many as ten years previously. The crew was subsequently named by the Soviet Navy amongst the most capable in the force at anti-submarine warfare. Nonetheless, over the following years, the amount of activity that the vessel saw decreased substantially. With the end of the Cold War and the dissolution of the Soviet Union in 1991, the navy reassessed its need for a large fleet and decided to retire some of its larger and more expensive ships. The class of warships was to be transferred to the Russian Navy. Despite this, on 5 March 1992, Vasily Chapayev was removed from active service. On 30 June 1993, the vessel was struck, decommissioned and transferred to be broken up, a process that started on 31 December.

During the vessel's career, Vasily Chapayev was assigned the temporary tactical numbers 545, 570, 239, 511, 549 and 590.
