= Voroshilovskoye, Russia =

Voroshilovskoye Ворошиловское
- Village
- Location within Bashkortostan Location within Russia
- Coordinates: 54°41′N 56°36′E
- Country: Russia
- Region: Bashkortostan
- District: Iglinsky District
- Time zone: UTC+5:00

Voroshilovskoye (Russian: Ворошиловское) is a rural locality (a village) in Kaltovsky Selsoviet, Iglinsky District, Bashkortostan, Russia. The population was 32 as of 2010. There is 1 street.

== Geography ==
Voroshilovskoye is located 30 km southeast of Iglino (the district's administrative centre) by road. Kaltovka is the nearest rural locality.
