= Voroshilovsky (rural locality) =

Voroshilovsky Ворошиловский
- Settlement
- Location within Voronezh Oblast Location within Russia
- Coordinates: 50°02′N 39°36′E
- Country: Russia
- Region: Voronezh Oblast
- District: Rossoshansky District
- Time zone: UTC+3:00

Voroshilovsky (Russian: Ворошиловский) is a rural locality (a settlement) in Kopenkinskoye Rural Settlement, Rossoshansky District, Voronezh Oblast, Russia. The population was 241 as of 2010. There are 5 streets.

== Geography ==
Voroshilovsky is located 24 km south of Rossosh (the district's administrative centre) by road. Raynovskoye is the nearest rural locality.
