= Voroshilov (surname) =

Voroshilov (feminine: Voroshilova) is a Russian-language surname. It may refer to:

- Ekaterina Voroshilova, spouse of Kliment Voroshilov, formally First Lady of the Soviet Union in 1953 to 1960
- Kliment Voroshilov (1881–1969), Marshal of the Soviet Union, Chairman of the Presidium of the Supreme Soviet of the Soviet Union
- Marina Voroshilova (1922–1986), Soviet virologist
- Viktor Voroshilov (1926–2011), Soviet footballer
- Vladimir Voroshilov (1930–2001), Russian TV personality
