= Soviet cruiser Vladivostok =

Soviet Kresta I-class cruiser

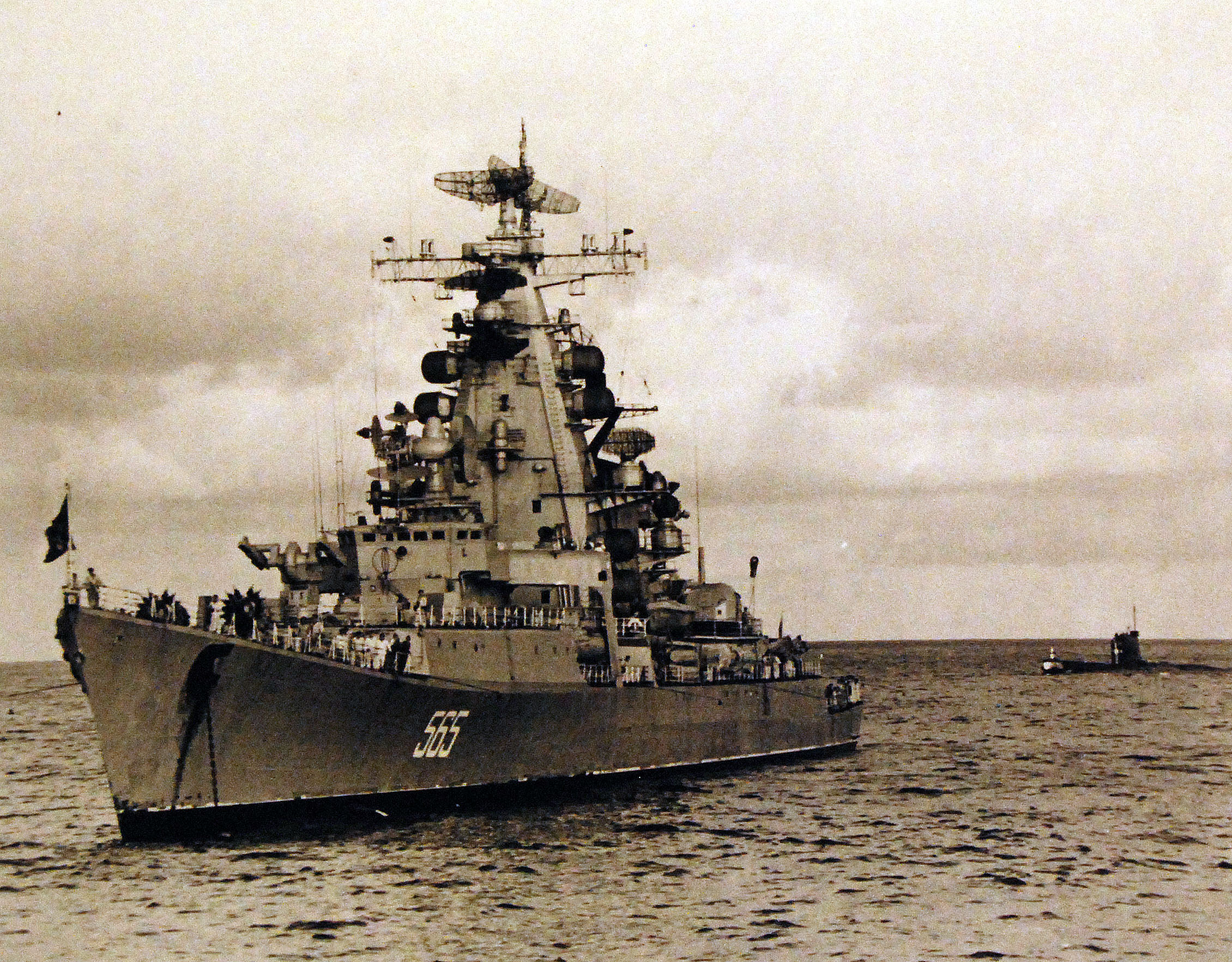
- Vladivostok in 1971.

History

Soviet Union
- Name: Vladivostok
- Namesake: Vladivostok
- Builder: A.A. Zhdanov, Leningrad
- Yard number: 792
- Laid down: 24 December 1964
- Launched: 1 August 1966
- Commissioned: 1 August 1969
- Decommissioned: 19 April 1990
- Fate: Sold to be broken up January 1991

General characteristics
- Class & type: Project 1134 Berkut-class cruiser
- Displacement: 5,340 t (5,260 long tons) (standard); 7,170 t (7,060 long tons) (full load)
- Length: 156.2 m (512 ft 6 in)
- Beam: 16.8 m (55 ft 1 in)
- Draught: 5.6 m (18 ft 4 in)
- Installed power: 4 × boilers; 46,000 shp (34,000 kW)
- Propulsion: 2 × shafts, 2 steam turbines
- Speed: 34 knots (63 km/h; 39 mph)
- Range: 10,500 nmi (19,446 km) at 14 knots (26 km/h)
- Complement: 312
- Sensors & processing systems: 1 × MR-500 Kliver early-warning radar; 1 × MR-310 Angara search radar; 1 × Binom-1134, 2 × 4R90 Yatagan, 2 × MR-103 Bars fire-control radars; 1 × MG-312M Titan sonar
- Electronic warfare & decoys: 2 x Gurzuf ESM radar system; 1 x ZIF-121 launcher for PK-2 decoy rockets
- Armament: 2 × twin 4K44 (SS-N-3 'Shaddock’) anti-ship missiles; 2 × twin M-1 Volna-M (SA-N-1 'Goa') surface-to-air missile launchers (64 missiles); 2 × twin 57 mm (2.2 in) AA guns; 2 × RBU-1000 anti-submarine rocket launchers; 2 × RBU-6000 anti-submarine rocket launchers; 2 × quintuple 533 mm (21 in) torpedo tubes
- Aircraft carried: 1 Kamov Ka-25T 'Hormone-B' helicopter
- Aviation facilities: Hangar and helipad

Vladivostok (Russian: Владивосток) was the second Soviet Navy Project 1134 Berkut Large Anti-submarine Ship (Russian: Большой Противолодочный Корабль, BPK) also known as an Admiral Zozulya-class guided missile cruiser or by the NATO reporting name Kresta I. Launched in August 1966, the ship was reclassified a Large Rocket Ship (Russian: Ракетные крейсера проекта, RKR) in August 1978 to reflect the wide-ranging capability of the vessel. Serving primarily in the Pacific Fleet during the Cold War, Vladivostok took part in exercises and tours that demonstrated Soviet naval power in the Indian and Pacific Oceans. The ship played a part at a number of points of potential escalation in the Cold War, including the Indo-Pakistani War of December 1971, the Mozambican Civil War in 1980 and the collision between the aircraft carrier Kitty Hawk and the submarine K-314 in March 1984. Vladivostok was taken out of service to be modernised and updated in September 1988 but there were insufficient funds to complete the work. Instead the ship was decommissioned in April 1990 and, the following January, sold to an Australian company to be broken up.

== Design and development ==
=== Design ===
Vladivostok was the second of four Project 1134 Berkut-class ships (NATO reporting name 'Kresta I' cruisers) for the Soviet Navy, also known as the Admiral Zozulya-class after the lead ship. The class was approved by Nikita Khrushchev as part of Sergey Gorshkov's buildup of the navy and envisioned as a more balanced follow-on to the specialist Project 58 and Project 61 classes, combining the attributes of both in a single hull. The ships mounted a primary armament of long-range missiles designed for attacking US Navy carrier battle groups. The members of the class were initially designated Large Anti-submarine Ships (Russian: Большой Противолодочный Корабль or BPK) by the Soviet Navy but this was changed to Large Rocket Ships (Russian: Ракетные крейсера проекта, RKR) in 1977 to reflect their wider role.

The vessel displaced 5,340 tonnes (5,260 long tons) standard and 7,170 tonnes (7,060 long tons) at full load, and was 156.2 m (512 ft) in overall length. (Note: NATO estimates vary. For example, the US Navy quoted 6,140 tons standard displacement, 7,600 tons full load and 155.6 m length.) Beam was 16.2 m (53 ft 2 in) on the waterline and average draught was 5.5 m (18 ft 1 in). Power was provided by two TV-12 steam turbines, fuelled by four KVN-98/64 high pressure boilers and driving two screws that provided 46,000 shaft horsepower (34,000 kW). Maximum design speed was 34 knots (63 km/h; 39 mph). The ship carried 1,690 t (1,660 long tons) of fuel oil, which gave a range of 10,500 nautical miles (19,446 km; 12,083 mi) at 14 knots (26 km/h; 16 mph). Electricity was provided by a TD-760 driven off steam drawn from the main boilers which powered a 380 V AC circuit at a frequency of 50 Hz. The ship's complement was 30 officers and 282 ratings.

=== Armament ===
For the anti-surface warfare role, Vladivostok was originally intended to mount the P-500 Bazalt (NATO reporting name SS-N-12 'Sandbox') missile, but protracted development meant that instead the same 4K44 missiles (NATO reporting name SS-N-3 'Shaddock') as carried by the Project 58 warships were mounted, although they were launched from two specially designed twin KT-35-1134 P-35 launchers carried midships. The missiles could each carry a 900 kg (2,000 lb) warhead over a range in excess of 500 kilometres (310 mi; 270 nmi). A landing pad and hangar was fitted aft for a ranging Kamov Ka-25T helicopter (NATO reporting name 'Hormone-B') to enable mid-course guidance.

Anti-aircraft defence was to be based around the new M-11 Shtorm (NATO reporting name SA-N-3 'Goblet') system but this did not become operational until 1969. Instead, protection was enhanced by mounting two twin ZIF-102 M-1 Volna-M launchers, one forward and the other aft, and up to 64 4K91 (NATO reporting name SA-N-1 'Goa') surface to air missiles, which was supplemented by two twin 57 mm (2 in) AK-725-MP-103 guns mounted on the aft superstructure. Defence against submarines was provided by two quintuple 533 mm (21 in) PTA-53-1134 torpedo launchers, a pair of six-barrelled RBU-1000 Smerch-3 launchers for 300 mm (11.8 in) anti-submarine rockets and a pair of twelve-barrelled RBU-6000 Smerch-2 launchers for 213 mm (8.4 in) anti-submarine rockets.

=== Sensors ===
Vitse-Admiral Drozd was equipped with the MR-500 Kliver (NATO reporting name 'Top Sail') early-warning radar, supported by a MR-310 Angara (NATO reporting name 'Head Net C') search radar, and one Volna (NATO reporting name 'Don Kay') navigational radar. The MR-500 was mounted on the funnel and had a range of between 270 and 300 km (170 and 190 mi). The MR-310 was a 3D radar carried on the mast that could detect aircraft out to 150 km (93 mi). For fire-control purposes the vessel had Binom-1134 for the surface-to-surface missiles. Guidance for the surface-to-air missiles was provided by two 4R90 Yatagan radars and for the guns by two MR-103 Bars (NATO reporting name 'Muff Cob') radars, complemented by a single ARP-50R radio direction finder. The ship carried three Nickel-KM and two Khrom-KM IFF systems.

The ship's electronic warfare equipment included the MRP-15-16 Zaliv and two sets each of the MRP-11-12 and MRP-13-14 direction-finding systems, as well as the MRP-150 Gurzuf A and MRP-152 Gurzuf B radar-jamming devices. Threat response was coordinated with a Planshet-1134 combat information control system. A ZIF-121 launcher for PK-2 decoy rockets was carried.

For anti-submarine warfare, the vessel was designed to be fitted with the improved GAS MG-332T Titan-2 hull-mounted sonar, but this was not ready in time to be included in the construction and so the MS-312M Titan was fitted instead, in a retractable bulbous radome. A single GAS MG-31 sonar was also fitted for detecting mines. The MG-26 Khosta underwater communication system and both MI-110R and MI-110K anti-submarine search stations were carried.

In the early 1970s, Vladivostok was upgraded with a MR-212 Vaygach navigation radar added and the missiles updated to 4M44. Between January 1980 and March 1983, the ship was upgraded with four six-barrel 30 mm (1 in) AK-630 close-in weapon systems installed near the bridge to improve anti-missile defence. Fire control for the AK-630 was managed by MP-123 Vympel radars, which had a range of up to 7 km (4.3 mi) against aircraft of the size of the Mikoyan-Gurevich MiG-21.

== Construction and career ==
Vladivostok was laid down on 24 December 1964 at A.A. Zhdanov in Leningrad with yard number 792, and launched on 1 August 1966. Commissioning took place exactly three years later, on 1 August 1969. The total cost of construction was 32 million rubles.

On commissioning, Vladivostok travelled with the Project 61 ship Strogy and other Soviet vessels on a long tour, via the Black Sea, Lagos in Nigeria, Somalia, the port of Aden in South Yemen and operations in the Indian Ocean from Baltic Sea to the ship's name port of Vladivostok, arriving on 11 February 1970. The ship was then attached to the 175th Missile Ship Brigade of the Pacific Fleet, and visited by delegations from Bulgaria on 26 May 1970 and Poland five days later. During October, joining Project 58 ship Varyag, Vladivostok undertook test firing of the main missiles. More tests were undertaken with the Project 675 submarine K-23 during August the following year.

Between 10 and 27 August 1971, the vessel, accompanied by Project 58 ship Admiral Fokin and supported by a fleet that included Strogy and Odaryonny, took part in a large exercise in the Pacific Ocean. It was during these manoeuvres that the main missiles were fired for the first time. The exercise was followed by an investigation of the testing areas used by the United States Navy between the Aleutian Islands and Hawaii, a distance of 13,800 nautical miles (25,600 km; 15,900 mi). The mission, which was completed on 3 October, was well received by the Soviet High Command.

On 3 December, the Bangladesh Liberation War was followed by an outbreak of war between India, supported by the Soviet Union, and Pakistan, supported by the United States. The conflict quickly involved naval vessels, with the Indian Navy sinking the destroyer Khaibar, minesweeper Muhafiz and MV Venus Challenger on 4 December in Operation Trident using Soviet-built P-15 Termit anti-ship missiles. Shortly afterwards on 9 December, the French-built submarine Hangor of the Pakistan Navy sank the Indian frigate Khurki. The submarine then disappearing in mysterious circumstances. The threat of further escalation and the intervention of the United States Navy led to the Soviet Union dispatching a substantial fleet to the Indian Ocean. Vladivostok was dispatched on 13 December, joined Varyag, Strogy and other vessels under the command of Dmitry Pozharsky and remained on station until 6 March the following year. Following the success of the operation, the ship returned to Vladivostok. The ship was made open to the public during April 1972 and, on 30 June, sailed on a tour with Minister of Defence Andrei Grechko, Admiral of the Fleet Sergey Gorshkov and other officials.

The next two decades were taken up with tests and exercises. While returning from one of these on 14 June 1973, the ship collided with the science research vessel Akademik Berg, which then sank killing 27 of the crew. Vladivostok took part in the rescue effort. The ship closed the 1970s with a tour of the Indian Ocean, visiting allies in Port Louis, Mauritius, Victoria, Seychelles, Maputo, Mozambique, Cam Ranh Bay, Vietnam, the Dahlak Archipelago, which was at that time part of Ethiopia, and Aden, finishing in August 1978. Further tours took place in 1980. Port Louis was visited again on 15 August and Kochi from 17 to 21 October. In between, the ship revisited Beira, Mozambique between 16 and 25 August as a gesture of solidarity with FRELIMO in their war with rebels backed by South Africa. In March 1984, the warship tracked the aircraft carrier Kitty Hawk in the Sea of Japan. On 21 March, while the crew of the Vladivostok were guiding the submarine K-314 to a station near the aircraft carrier, an error meant that the submarine surfaced into American ship. The aircraft carrier received minor damage when they collided and, despite more significant damage, the submarine also made it back to port safely. Vladivostok was unharmed.

On 28 September 1988, the ship was taken out of service to be upgraded at Vladivostok. Lack of funding meant that work was only 90% complete when, instead, Vladivostok was decommissioned on 19 April 1990. The ship was sold to be broken up by an Australian company during January 1991.

The ship was assigned the temporary tactical numbers 563, 565, 542, 106, 139, 017, 029 and 034.
