= Soviet destroyer Strogy (1967) =

Kashin-class destroyer of the Soviet Navy

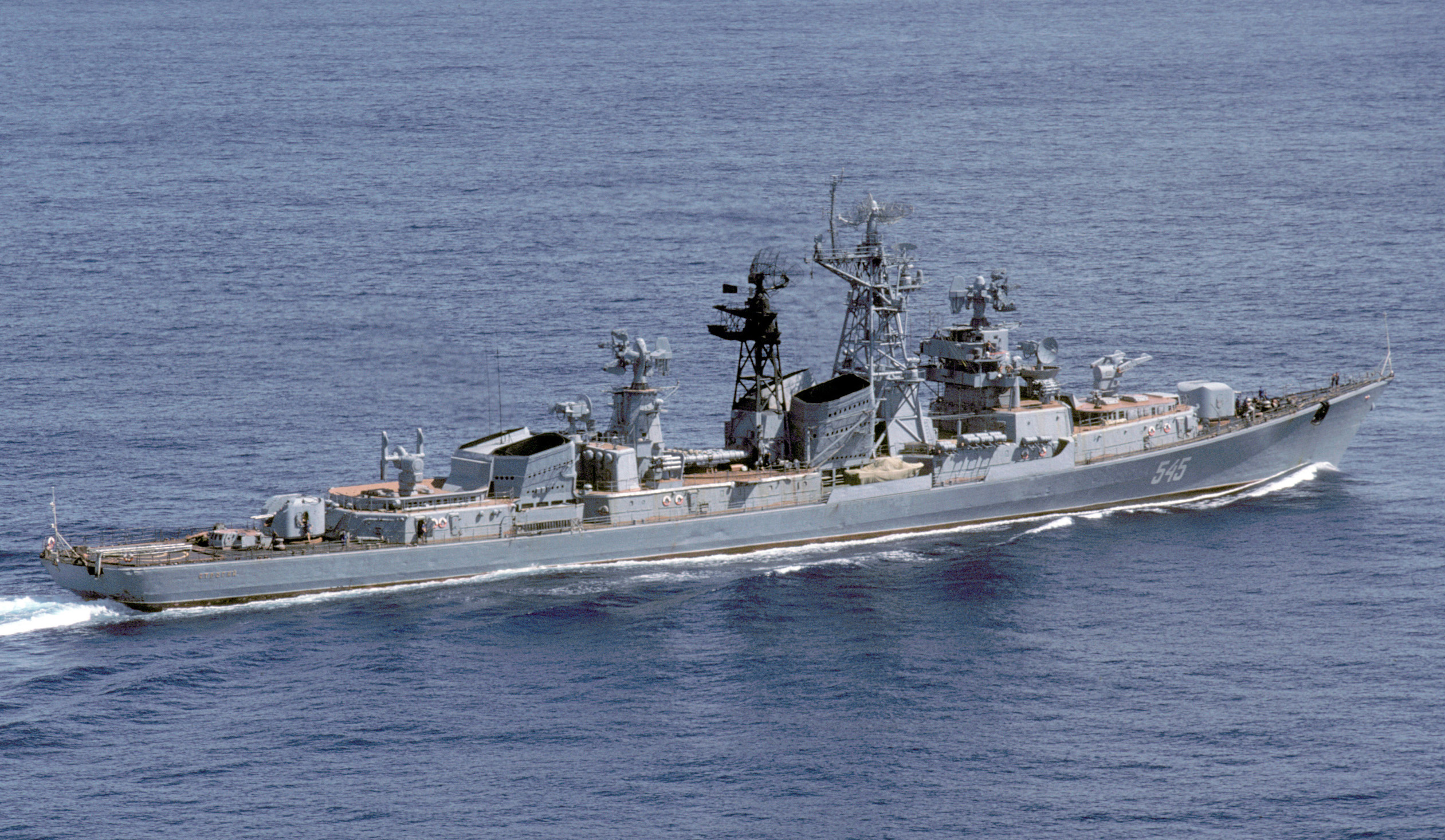
- Strogy on 1 September 1985

History

Soviet Union → Russia
- Name: Strogy; (Строгий)
- Namesake: Strict in Russian
- Builder: 61 Communards Shipyard, Nikolayev
- Laid down: 22 February 1966
- Launched: 29 April 1967
- Commissioned: 24 December 1968
- Decommissioned: 30 June 1993
- Home port: Vladivostok
- Identification: Pennant number: 545
- Fate: Sank off Singapore in 1995

General characteristics
- Class & type: Kashin-class destroyer
- Displacement: 3,400 tons standard, 4,390 tons full load
- Length: 144 m (472 ft)
- Beam: 15.8 m (52 ft)
- Draught: 4.6 m (15 ft)
- Propulsion: 2 × COGAG; 2 shafts, 4 × M8E gas turbines M3 unit aggregate; 72,000 hp (54,000 kW) up to 96,000 hp (72,000 kW)
- Speed: 38 kn (70 km/h; 44 mph) (4 gas turbines on full power)
- Range: 3,500 nmi (6,480 km; 4,030 mi) at 18 kn (33 km/h; 21 mph)
- Complement: 266 to 320
- Armament: 2 × twin 76 mm (3 in) AK-726 guns; 2 × twin SA-N-1 'Goa' surface-to-air missile launchers (32 missiles); 1 × 5 533 mm (21 in) torpedo tubes; 2 × 12 RBU-6000 anti-submarine rocket launchers; 2 × 6 RBU-1000 anti-submarine rocket launchers
- Aircraft carried: 1 x Ka-27 series helicopter
- Aviation facilities: Helipad

Strogy was a Kashin-class destroyer of the Soviet Navy.

== Development and design ==
Late 1950s and 1960s was an era of great changes in the history of the navy, new opportunities and new weapons. This was primarily due to the emergence of sea-based nuclear missiles, which turned submarines into strategic weapons. The appearance of nuclear power plants on submarines had greatly increased their autonomy, cruising range, underwater speed and, as a consequence, the severity of the threat they created.

From the very beginning, two options for the main power plant were considered - a traditional steam turbine (STU) or a gas turbine (GTU). The latter, due to its lightness and compactness (specific gravity 5.2 kg / l. From. Versus 9 kg / l. From.), Reduced the ship's displacement from 3600 to 3200 tons and increased its efficiency. In addition, starting from a cold state took 5–10 minutes for the GTU compared to the several hours required for the STU. For these reasons, the option with gas turbine engines was adopted.

The armament of the new ship was innovative. For the first time in Soviet shipbuilding, it was equipped with two anti-aircraft missile systems (M-1 "Volna"). Each complex consisted of a two-boom launcher ZIF-101, a Yatagan control system and a magazine with two rotating drums for 8 V-600 missiles each.

== Construction and career ==
Strogy was laid down on 22 February 1966, and launched on 29 April 1967 by 61 Communards Shipyard in Nikolayev. She was commissioned on 24 December 1968.

On 15 July 1986, she collided with Kara-class cruiser Nikolayev.

On 30 June 1993, she was decommissioned and was sold to India for scrap, but on the way the ship sank near Singapore in 1995.

== Gallery ==
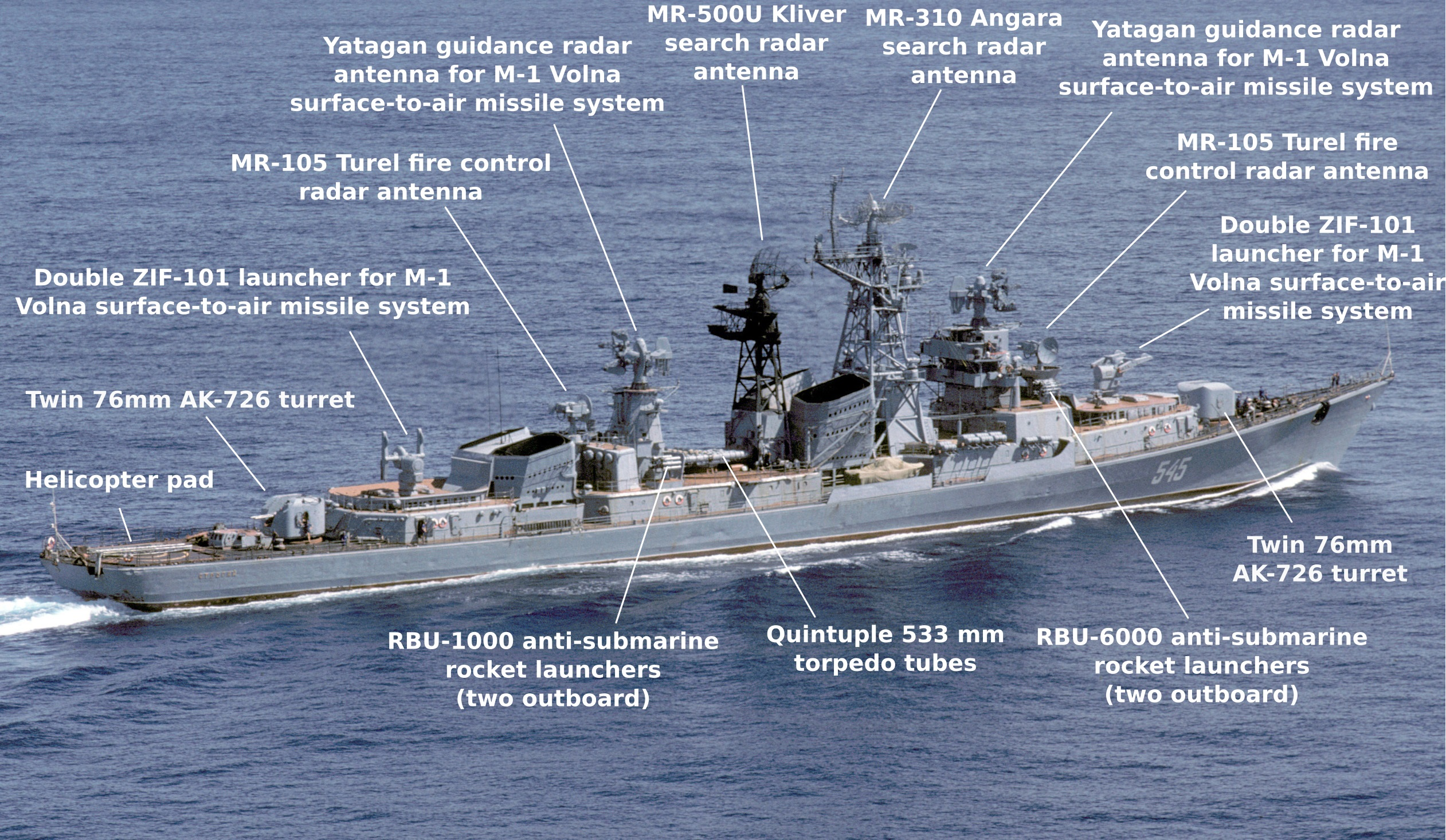
Strogy on 1 September 1985.

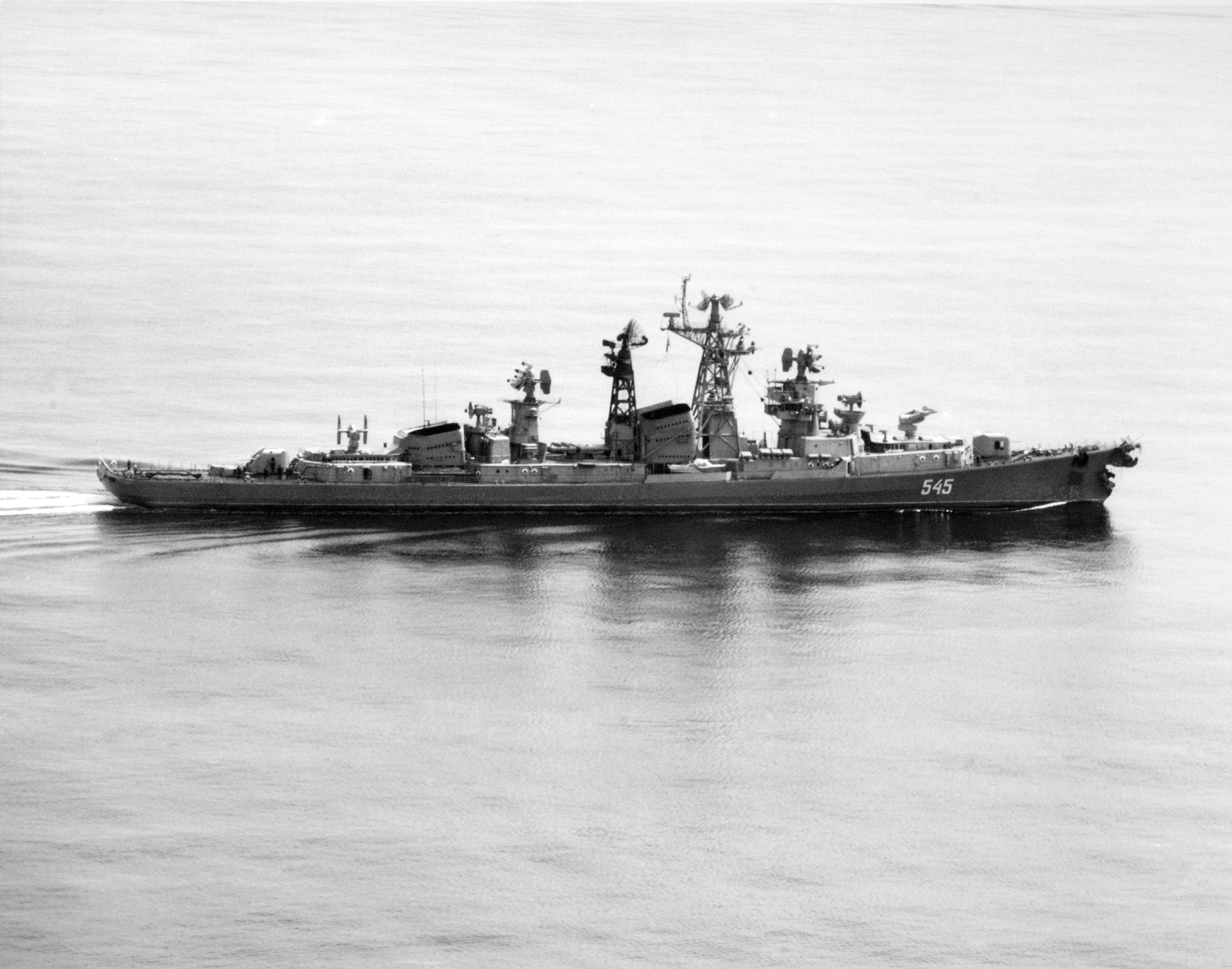
Strogy on 15 July 1986.

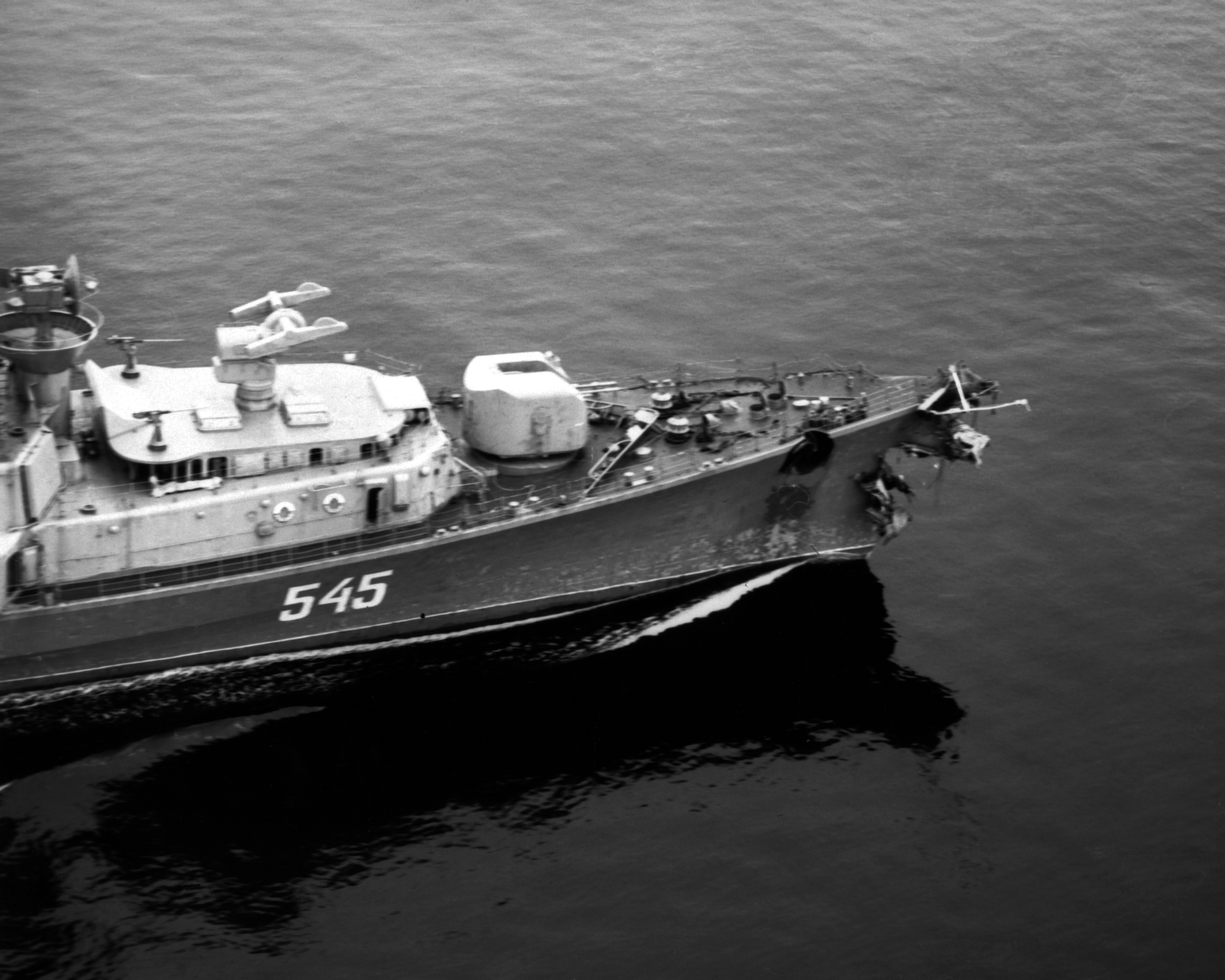
Strogy on 15 July 1986.
