= Soviet cruiser Admiral Senyavin =

Soviet Sverdlov-class cruiser

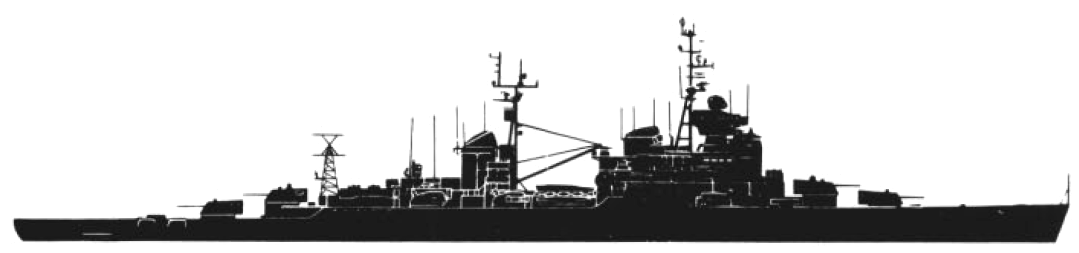
- Profile drawing of Sverdlov-class cruiser

History

Soviet Union
- Name: Admiral Senyavin; (Адмирал Сенявин)
- Namesake: Dmitry Senyavin
- Ordered: 31 August 1951
- Builder: Baltic Shipyard, Leningrad
- Yard number: 437
- Laid down: 31 October 1951
- Launched: 22 December 1952
- Commissioned: 30 November 1954
- Decommissioned: 1 December 1986
- Stricken: 15 December 1989
- Identification: See Pennant numbers
- Fate: Scrapped, 1992

General characteristics
- Class & type: Sverdlov-class cruiser
- Displacement: as designed: 13,600 tonnes (13,385 long tons) standard; 16,640 tonnes (16,377 long tons) full load; command ship: 14,350 tonnes (14,123 long tons) standard; 17,890 t (17,607 long tons) full load
- Length: 210 m (689 ft 0 in) overall; 205 m (672 ft 7 in) waterline
- Beam: 22 m (72 ft 2 in)
- Draught: 6.9 m (22 ft 8 in)
- Propulsion: 2 × shaft geared steam turbines; 6 × boilers, 110,000 hp (82,000 kW)
- Speed: 32.5 knots (60.2 km/h; 37.4 mph)
- Range: 9,000 nmi (17,000 km; 10,000 mi) at 18 knots (33 km/h; 21 mph)
- Complement: as designed: 1,250; command ship: 856
- Sensors & processing systems: as designed; P-10 air-search radar; Gyuys-2 air-search radar; Rif surface-search radar; 2 × Neptun radars; command ship: P-12 Enisey air-search radar; MR-510 Kil-U air-search radar; MR-302 Rubka surface-search radar; 4R-33 fire-control systems; 4MR-104 Rys fire control systems; Don navigation radar; Planshet combat information system; 790 Tsunami-BM satellite; Kristall-K satellite (from 1977); Karat-M satellite (from 1977)
- Electronic warfare & decoys: Krab-11 ESM radar
- Armament: as designed: 4 × triple 15.2 cm (6.0 in)/57 cal B-38 guns in Mk5-bis turrets; 6 × twin 10 cm (3.9 in)/56 cal Model 1934 guns in SM-5-1 mounts; 16 × twin 3.7 cm (1.5 in) AA guns in V-11M mounts; 2 × quintuple 533 mm (21.0 in) torpedo tubes in PTA-53-68-bis mounts; command ship: 2 × triple 15.2 cm (6.0 in)/57 cal B-38 guns in Mk5-bis turrets.; 6 × twin 10 cm (3.9 in)/56 cal Model 1934 guns in SM-5-1 mounts; 14 x twin 37 mm anti-aircraft AA guns in V-11M mounts; 1 × twin ZIF-122 4K33 Osa-M SAM; 20 × 9M33 missiles; 8 × twin AK-230
- Armour: Belt: 100 mm (3.9 in); Conning tower: 150 mm (5.9 in); Deck: 50 mm (2.0 in); Turrets: 175 mm (6.9 in) front, 65 mm (2.6 in) sides, 60 mm (2.4 in) rear, 75 mm (3.0 in) roof; Barbettes: 130 mm (5.1 in); Bulkheads: 100–120 mm (3.9–4.7 in)
- Aircraft carried: 1 × Kamov Ka-25
- Aviation facilities: Hangar and helipad

Admiral Senyavin was a Sverdlov-class cruiser of the Soviet Navy.

== Development and design ==
The Sverdlov-class cruisers, Soviet designation Project 68bis, were the last conventional gun cruisers built for the Soviet Navy. They were built in the 1950s and were based on Soviet, German, and Italian designs and concepts developed prior to the Second World War. They were modified to improve their sea keeping capabilities, allowing them to run at high speed in the rough waters of the North Atlantic. The basic hull was more modern and had better armor protection than the vast majority of the post Second World War gun cruiser designs built and deployed by peer nations. They also carried an extensive suite of modern radar equipment and anti-aircraft artillery. The Soviets originally planned to build 40 ships in the class, which would be supported by the Stalingrad-class battlecruisers and aircraft carriers.

The Sverdlov class displaced 13,600 tons standard and 16,640 tons at full load. They were 210 metres (689 ft 0 in) long overall and 205 metres (672 ft 7 in) long at the waterline. They had a beam of 22 metres (72 ft 2 in) and draught of 6.9 metres (22 ft 8 in) and typically had a complement of 1,250. The hull was a completely welded new design and the ships had a double bottom for over 75% of their length. The ship also had twenty-three watertight bulkheads. The Sverdlovs had six boilers providing steam to two shaft geared steam turbines generating 118,100 shaft horsepower (88,100 kW). This gave the ships a maximum speed of 32.5 knots (60.2 km/h; 37.4 mph). The cruisers had a range of 9,000 nautical miles (17,000 km; 10,000 mi) at 18 knots (33 km/h; 21 mph).

Sverdlov-class cruisers main armament included twelve 152 mm (6 in)/57 cal B-38 guns mounted in four triple Mk5-bis turrets. They also had twelve 100 mm (3.9 in)/56 cal Model 1934 guns in six twin SM-5-1 mounts. For anti-aircraft weaponry, the cruisers had thirty-two 37 mm (1.5 in) anti-aircraft guns in sixteen twin mounts and were also equipped with ten 533 mm (21 in) torpedo tubes in two mountings of five each.

The Sverdlovs had 100 mm (3.9 in) belt armor and had a 50 mm (2.0 in) armored deck. The turrets were shielded by 175 mm (6.9 in) armor and the conning tower, by 150 mm (5.9 in) armor.

The cruisers' ultimate radar suite included one 'Big Net' or 'Top Trough' air search radar, one 'High Sieve' or 'Low Sieve' air search radar, one 'Knife Rest' air search radar and one 'Slim Net' air search radar. For navigational radar they had one 'Don-2' or 'Neptune' model. For fire control purposes the ships were equipped with two 'Sun Visor' radars, two 'Top Bow' 152 mm gun radars and eight 'Egg Cup' gun radars. For electronic countermeasures the ships were equipped with two 'Watch Dog' ECM systems.

== Construction and career ==
The ship was built at Baltic Shipyard in Leningrad and was launched on 22 December 1952 and commissioned on 30 November 1954. On 18 December 1954, she entered the 4th Navy.

On 7 September 1955, she was transferred to the Northern Fleet. Then on 24 December 1955, after crossing the Northern Sea Route from Severomorsk to the Far East, she was transferred to Pacific Fleet.

From 17–21 November 1959, she visited Surabaya.

From 31 December 1966 to 24 July 1972, she underwent modernization and rebuilt at Dalzavod in Vladivostok according to Project 68U2 Bukhta-2.

From 14–19 January 1973, she visited to Bombay. From 15–20 March, she visited to Mogadishu. On 13 March, she was reclassified as a command cruiser. From 20–24 December, she visited to Port Louis.

From 1975 to 1977, the cruiser was commanded by Feliks Gromov, the future admiral of the fleet.

On 13 June 1978, during the a live-firing test, an explosion followed by fire occurred on the ship in the first bow turret of the main battery, killing 37 of the ship's crew.

From 5–10 November 1979, she visit to Haiphong.

On 1 December 1986, she was decommissioned from the navy, mothballed and laid to rest.

On 30 May 1989, she was disarmed and expelled by the navy. On 15 December, she was struck from the navy list.

In 1992, she was sold to a private Indian firm for scrap in India.

=== Pennant numbers ===
Date	Pennant number
1956	12
1956	51
1958	138
1959	125
	203
	619
1964	825
	833
1972	832
1973	838
1977	833
1980	472
1981	490
1985	485
1988	472
1989	052

== See also ==
- Cruiser
- Sverdlov-class cruiser
- List of ships of the Soviet Navy
- List of ships of Russia by project number
