= List of ships of the Soviet Navy =

This is a list of ships and classes of the Soviet Navy.

== Soviet Ship Type Designations ==
	Russian Terminology	English Translation
AK	Artilleriyskiy Kater	Artillery Cutter
BDK	Bol'shoy Desantnyy Korabl'	Large Landing Ship
BPK	Bol'shoy Protivolodochnyy Korabl'	Large Anti-Submarine Ship
BRK	Bol'shoy Raketnyy Korabl'	Large Missile Ship
BT	Bazovyy Tral'shchik	Base Minesweeper
DK	Desantnyy Korabl'	Landing Ship
DKVP	Desantnyy Korabl' Na Vozdushnoy Podushke	Air-Cushion Landing Ship
EHOS	Ekspeditsionnoye Okeanograficheskoye Sudno	Expeditionary Oceanographic Vessel
EM	Eskadrennyy Minonosets	Destroyer
GKS	Gidroakusticheskoye Kontrol'noye Sudno	Hydroacoustic Monitoring Vessel
GS	Gidrograficheskoye Sudno	Hydrographic Vessel
KIL	Kilektor	Lift Ship
KR	Kreyser	Cruiser
KRZ	Korabl' Razvedyvatel'nyy	Intelligence Ship
KS	Kabel'noye Sudno	Cable Vessel
KSV	Korabl' Svyazey	Communications Ship
KTs	Kontrol'naya Tsel'	Controlled Target
KVN	Korabl' Vozdushnogo Nablyudeniya	Radar Surveillance Ship
LDK	Ledokol	Icebreaker
MB	Morskoy Buksir	Seagoing Tug
MPK	Malyy Protivolodochnyy	Small Anti-Submarine Ship
MRK	Malyy Raketnyy Korabl'	Small Missile Ship
MT	Morskoy Tral'shchik	Seagoing Minesweeper
MVT	Morskoy Vodnyy Tanker	Seagoing Water Tanker
OS	Opitnoye Sudno	Experimental Vessel
PB	Plavuchaya Baza	Floating Base
PKA	Protivolodochnyy Kater	Anti-Submarine Cutter
PKR	Protivolodochnyy Kreyser	Anti-Submarine Cruiser
PL	Podvodnaya Lodka	Submarine
PLA	Podvodnaya Lodka Atomnaya	Submarine (nuclear)
PLARB	Podvodnaya Lodka Atomnaya Raketnaya Ballisticheskaya	Ballistic Missile Submarine (nuclear)
PLARK	Podvodnaya Lodka Atomnaya Raketnaya Krylataya	Cruise Missile Submarine (nuclear)
PLRB	Podvodnaya Lodka Raketnaya Ballisticheskaya	Ballistic Missile Submarine
PLRK	Podvodnaya Lodka Raketnaya Krylataya	Cruise Missile Submarine
PSKR	Pogranichniy Storozhevoy Korabl'	Border Patrol Ship
RKA	Raketnyy Kater	Missile Cutter
RKR	Raketnyy Kreyser	Missile Cruiser
SB	Spasatel'nyy Buksir	Rescue Tug
SBR	Sudno Bol'shogo Razmagnichivanya	Large Deperming Vessel
SDK	Srednyy Desantnyy Korabl'	Medium Landing Ship
SKR	Storozhevoy Korabl'	Patrol Ship
SR	Sudno Razmagnichivanya	Deperming Vessel
SS	Spasatel'noye Sudno	Salvage Vessel
SSV	Sudno Svyazyy	Communications Vessel
TAKR	Takticheskoye Avianosnyy Kreyser	Tactical Aircraft Carrying Cruiser
TKA	Torpednyy Kater	Torpedo Cutter
US	Uchebnoye Sudno	Training Vessel
VT	Voyennyy Tanker	Military Tanker
VTR	Voyennyy Transport	Military Transport
ZM	Zagraditel' Minnyy	Minelayer

== Corvettes / MPK, MRK ==
In the Soviet Navy these were classified as small anti-submarine ships (MPK) or small missile ships (MRK).

- Kronshtadt class (Projects 122A, 122bis)
- Poti class (Project 204)
- Grisha class (Project 1124 Al'batros)
  - Grisha I class (Project 1124.1), 37 ships built in 1966–1982
  - Grisha II class (Project 1124P, P stands for pogranichnyi – on the border), 20 ships built in 1972–1988
  - Grisha III class (AK-630 CIWS-equipped variant)
  - Grisha IV class (Project 1124K)
  - Grisha V class (Project 1124M, sometimes noted as 1124.4)
- Nanuchka class (Project 1234 Ovod)
  - Nanuchka I class
  - Nanuchka II class (Project 1234E)
  - Nanuchka III class (Project 1234.1)
  - Nanuchka IV class (Project 1234.7)
- Bora class (Project 1239 Sivuch)
  - MRK-27 (1989)
- Sarancha class (Project 1240 Uragan, considered missile boats by NATO)
  - MRK-5 (1977)
- Tarantul class (Project 1241 Molniya, classified as large missile cutters)
  - Tarantul I class (Project 1241RE)
  - Tarantul II class (Project 1241.1)
  - Tarantul III class (Project 1124.1M)
  - Pauk class (Project 1241.2, anti-submarine corvette variant)
- Parchim II class (Project 133.1M)
  - MPK-192 (1986)
  - MPK-205 (1986)
  - MPK-67 (1987)
  - MPK-99 (1987)
  - MPK-105 (1988)
  - MPK-213 (1988)
  - MPK-216 (1988)
  - MPK-219 (1988)
  - MPK-224 (1989)
  - MPK-227 (1989)
  - MPK-228 (1989)
  - MPK-229 (1989)

== Guardships / SKR ==
In the Soviet Navy, frigates were classified as guard ships (SKR)

- Uragan class (Projects 2, 4, & 39)
- Yastreb class (Project 29)
- Kola class (Project 42 Sokol)
- Riga class (Project 50 Gornostay)
- Kashin class (Project 61, briefly)
  - Komsomolets Ukrainy – Ukrainian Komsomol (1960)
  - Soobrazitelnyy – Astute (1961)
  - Provornyy – Agile (1962)
  - Obraztsovyy – Exemplary (1964)
  - Odarennyy – Gifted (1964)
  - Otvazhnyy – Courageous (1964)
  - Steregushchiy – Watchful (1966)
- Petya class (Project 159)
- Mirka class (Project 35)
- Koni class (Project 1159 Del'fin)
- Krivak I class (Project 1135 Burevestnik)
  - Bditelnyy – Watchful (1970)
  - Bodryy – Brisk (1971)
  - Svirepyy – Fierce (1971)
  - Storozhevoy – Vigilant (1972), involved in a mutiny in 1975, this incident inspired the novel The Hunt for Red October.
  - Razyashchiy – Smashing (1973)
  - Razumnyy – Clever (1974)
  - Druzhnyy – Friendly (1975)
  - Dostoynyy – Virtuous (1971)
  - Doblestnyy – Valourous (1973)
  - Deyatelnyy – Active (1973)
  - Zharkiy – Torrid (1975)
  - Bezzavetnyy – Serene (1978)
  - Retivyy – Ardent (1976)
  - Leningradskiy Komsomolets – Leningrad Komsomol (1976); renamed Legkiy, "Light" in 1992.
  - Letuchiy – Flighty (1977)
  - Pylkiy – Fervent (1979)
  - Zadornyy – Passionate (1979)
  - Bezukoriznennyy – Irreproachable (1980)
  - Ladny – Harmonious (1980)
  - Poryvistyy – Squally (1980)
- Krivak II class (Project 1135M Burevestnik M)
  - Rezvyy – Frisky (1975)
  - Rezkiy – Sharp (1976)
  - Grozyashchiy – Threatening (1977)
  - Razitelnyy – Striking (1977)
  - Neukrotimyy – Untamable (1978)
  - Besmennyy – Unchanging (1979)
  - Gordelivyy – Proud (1979)
  - Gromkiy – Loud (1979)
  - Revnostnyy – Zealous (1980)
  - Ryavnyy – Zealous (1980)
  - Pytlivyy – Inquisitive (1982)
- Neustrashimy class (Project 11540 Yastreb)
  - Neustrashimy – Fearless (1993)

== Gunboats ==
- Krasnaya Abkhaziya
- Krasnaya Armeniya
- Krasnaya Gruziya
- Krasnoye Znamya
- Krasnyy Adzharistan

== Destroyers / BPK, BRK, EM ==
In the Soviet Navy, smaller ships under the designation of Large Antisubmarine Ships (BPK) alongside those classified as Large Missile Ship (BRK) were also categorized as destroyers by NATO.

- Yakov Sverdlov (1917)
- Derzky class
- Orfey class
- Fidonisy class
- Izyaslav class
  - Karl Marx (1918)
  - Kalinin (1918)
- Leningrad class (Project 1/Project38)
  - Leningrad (1936)
  - Kharkov (1938)
  - Moskva (1938)
  - Minsk (1939)
  - Baku (1939)
  - Tbilisi (1940)
- Gnevny class (Project 7)
  - Gnevy – Angry (1938)
  - Gordy – Proud (1938)
  - Gromky – Loud (1938)
  - Grozny – Formidable (1938)
  - Gremyashchy – Thunderous (1938)
  - Smetlivy – Sly (1938)
  - Stremitelny – Impetuous (1938)
  - Bodry – Brisk (1939)
  - Bystry – Fast (1939)
  - Bezuprechy – Irreproachable (1939)
  - Bditelny – Watchful (1939)
  - Boyky – Spry (1939)
  - Besposhchadny – Merciless (1939)
  - Grozyashchy – Threatening (1939)
  - Sokrushitelny – Destructive (1939)
  - Steregushchy – Watchful (1939)
  - Ryany – Spirited (1939)
  - Rastoropny – Prompt (1940)
  - Rezvy – Frisky (1940)
  - Razyashchy – Furious (1940)
  - Reshitelny – Decisive (1941)
  - Retivy – Ardent (1941)
  - Revnostny – Enthusiastic (1941)
  - Razyaryonny – Enraged (1941)
  - Razumny – Sensible (1941)
  - Rekordny – Record Breaking (1941)
  - Rezky – Brusque (1942)
  - Redky – Rare (1942)
- Tashkent class (Project 20)
  - Tashkent (1939)
- Storozhevoy class (Project 7U)
  - Storozhevoy – Protective (1940)
  - Silny – Strong (1940)
  - Serdity – Enraged (1940)
  - Stoyky – Steadfast (1940)
  - Smyshlyony – Clever (1940)
  - Slavny – Glorious (1941)
  - Smely – Valiant (1941)
  - Strashny – Frightening (1941)
  - Surovy – Severe (1941)
  - Skory – Rapid (1941)
  - Statny – Stately (1941)
  - Strogy – Strict (1941)
  - Svirepy – Fierce (1941)
  - Soobrazitelny – Shrewd (1941)
  - Sposobny – Capable (1941)
  - Sovershenny – Absolute (1941)
  - Svobodny – Free (1942)
- Opytny class (Project 45)
  - Opytny – Experimental (1941)
- Town class (on loan 1944–1952 from the UK)
  - Deyatelny (HMS Churchill)
  - Derzky (HMS Chelsea)
  - Zhyostky (HMS Roxborough)
  - Dostoyny (HMS St Albans)
  - Druzhny (HMS Lincoln)
  - Zharkiy (HMS Brighton)
  - Zhguchy (HMS Leamington)
  - Zhivuchiy (HMS Richmond)
  - Doblestny (HMS Georgetown)
- Vifor class (ex-Romanian)
  - Lovkiy – Dexterous (1944)
  - Lyogkiy – Nimble (1944)
- Regele Ferdinand class (ex-Romanian)
  - Likhoy – Dashing (1944)
  - Letuchiy – Flying (1944)
- Type 1934A (ex-German)
  - Pylky – Ardent (1945)
  - Prytky – Nimble (1945)
- Type 1936 (ex-German)
  - Prochny – Durable (1945)
- Type 1936A (ex-German)
  - Provorny – Nimble (1945)
- Akizuki class (ex-Japanese)
  - Vnezapny – Sudden (1947)
- Fubuki class (ex-Japanese)
  - Verniy – Loyal (1947)
- Ognevoy class (Project 30)
- Soldati class (ex-Italian)
  - Lyogky – Easy (1950)
  - Lovky – Dexterous (1950)
- Skory class (Project 30bis)
- Neutrashimy class (Project 41)
  - Neustrashimy – Dauntless (1955)
- Kotlin class (Project 56/56PLO/56A/56K)
  - Svetly – Bright (1955)
  - Speshny – Rapid (1955)
  - Blestyashchy – Brilliant (1955)
  - Byvalvy – Experienced (1955)
  - Skromny – Modest (1955)
  - Bravy - Brave (1956)
  - Svedushchy – Knowledgeable (1956)
  - Vesky – Convincing (1956)
  - Vyzyavayushchy – Challenging (1956)
  - Spokoiny - Peaceful (1956)
  - Moskovsky Komsomolets (originally Smyshleny – Quickwitted) (1956)
  - Skrytny – Secretive (1956)
  - Soznatelny – Aware (1956)
  - Bessledny – Untraceable (1956)
  - Vdokhnovenny – Inspiring (1956)
  - Spravedlivy – Just (1956)
  - Burlivy – Turbulent (1956)
  - Vozmushcheny – Indignant (1956)
  - Nesokrushimy – Indestructible (1957)
  - Blagorodny – Noble (1957)
  - Plamenny – Fiery (1957)
  - Naporisty – Forceful (1957)
  - Vliyatelny – Influential (1957)
  - Vyderzhanny – Consistent (1957)
  - Nakhodchivy – Resourceful (1957)
  - Nastoychivy – Persistent (1958)
- Kildin class (Project 56M/56EM/56U)
  - Bedovy – Mischievous (1958)
  - Neulovimy – Elusive (1958)
  - Prozorlivy – Perceptive (1958)
  - Neuderzhimy – Unrestrainable (1958)
  - Neukrotimy – Indomitable (not completed)
- Kanin/Krupnyy class (Project 57bis/57A)
  - Gnevy – Angry (1960)
  - Gremyashchy – Thundering (1960)
  - Uporny – Persistently (1960)
  - Zhguchy – Burning (1960)
  - Gordy – Proud (1961)
  - Boyky – Briskly (1961)
  - Zorky – Sharp-sighted (1961)
  - Derzky – Bold (1961)
  - Khrabry – Brave (not completed)
- Kashin class (Project 61)
  - Komsomolets Ukrainy – Ukrainian Komsomol (1960)
  - Soobrazitelnyy – Astute (1961)
  - Provornyy – Agile (1962)
  - Obraztsovyy – Exemplary (1964)
  - Odarennyy – Gifted (1964)
  - Otvazhnyy – Courageous (1964)
  - Steregushchiy – Watchful (1966)
  - Krasnyy Kavkaz – Red Caucasus (1966)
  - Reshitelnyy – Decisive (1966)
  - Strogiy – Severe (1967)
  - Smetlivyy – Resourceful (1967)
  - Krasnyy Krym (1969)
  - Sposobnyy – Capable(1970)
  - Skoryy – Fast (1971)
- Modified Kashin class (Project 61MP)
  - Ognevoy – Fiery (1963)
  - Slavnyy – Glorious (1965)
  - Stroynyy – Harmonious (1965)
  - Smyshlennyy – Humorous (1966)
  - Smelyy – Valiant (1968)
  - Sderzhannyy – Restrained (1972)
- Sovremennyy class (Project 956 Sarych)
  - Sovremennyy – Modern (1980)
  - Otchayannyy – Foolhardy (1982)
  - Otlichnyy – Perfect (or Excellent) (1983)
  - Osmotritelnyy – Circumspect (1984)
  - Bezuprechnyy – Irreproachable (1985)
  - Boyevoy – Militant (1986)
  - Stoykiy – Steadfast (1986)
  - Okrylennyy – Inspiring (1987)
  - Burnyy – Fiery (1988)
  - Gremyashchiy – Thunderous (originally Vedushchiy) (1988)
  - Bystryy – Quick (1989)
  - Rastoropnyy – Prompt (1989)
  - Bezboyaznennyy – Intrepid (1990)
  - Bezuderzhnyy – Tenacious (1991)
  - Bespokoynyy – Restless (1992)
  - Nastoychivyy – Reliable (originally Moskovskiy Komsomolets) (1993)
  - Besstrashnyy – Fearless (1994)
  - Vazhnyy – Eminent (not completed)
  - Vdumchivyy – Thoughtful (not completed)
- Udaloy I class (Project 1155 Fregat)
  - Udaloy – Bold (1980)
  - Vice-Admiral Kulakov (1980)
  - Marshal Vasilevskiy (1982)
  - Admiral Zakharov (1982)
  - Admiral Spiridonov (1983)
  - Admiral Tributs (1983)
  - Marshal Shaposhnikov (1985)
  - Severomorsk (1985)
  - Admiral Levchenko (1987)
  - Admiral Vinogradov (1987)
  - Admiral Kharlamov (1988)
  - Admiral Panteleyev (1990)
- Udaloy II class (Project 1155.1 Fregat-M)
  - Admiral Chabanenko (1995)
  - Admiral Basistyy (not completed)
  - Admiral Kucherov (not completed)

== Cruisers / KR, RKR ==
Name	Class	Built	In service	Status	Image
Aurora	Diana class	1903	1903-1945	Museum ship since 1956	
Komintern	Bogatyr-class	1905	1905-1942	Sunk 1942	
Chervona Ukraina	Admiral Nakhimov-class	1927	1927-1941	Sunk 1941, raised and used as a target	
Krasny Krym	Svetlana-class cruiser	1928	1928-1959	Scrapped 1959	
Krasny Kavkaz	Admiral Nakhimov-class	1932	1932-1952	Sunk as target 1952	
Kirov	Kirov-class cruiser	1938	1938-1974	Scrapped in 1974	
Voroshilov	Kirov-class cruiser	1940	1940-1973	Scrapped 1973	
Maxim Gorky	Kirov-class cruiser	1940	1940-1959	Scrapped 1959	
Molotov	Kirov-class cruiser	1941	1941-1972	Scrapped 1972	
Kaganovich	Kirov-class cruiser	1944	1944-1960	Scrapped 1960	
Kalinin	Kirov-class cruiser	1953	1953-1963	Scrapped 1963	
Murmansk	Omaha-class cruiser	1921	1944-1949	Scrapped 1949	
Tallinn	Admiral Hipper-class cruiser	1939	1944-1960	Scrapped 1960	
Chapayev	Chapayev class	1950	1950-1960	Scrapped 1960	
Zheleznyakov	Chapayev class	1950	1950-1976	Scrapped 1976	
Kuybyshev	Chapayev class	1950	1950-1965	Scrapped 1965	
Chkalov	Chapayev class	1950	1950-1981	Scrapped 1981	
Frunze	Chapayev class	1950	1950-1960	Scrapped 1960	
Sverdlov	Sverdlov class	1952	1952-1989	Scrapped 1993	
Zhdanov	Sverdlov class	1952	1952-1991	Scrapped 1991	
Admiral Ushakov	Sverdlov class	1953	1953-1987	Scrapped 1987	
Aleksandr Suvorov	Sverdlov class	1953	1953-1990	Scrapped 1990	
Admiral Senyavin	Sverdlov class	1954	1954-1991	Scrapped 1991	
Dmitry Pozharsky	Sverdlov class	1954	1954-1987	Scrapped 1987	
Kronstadt	Sverdlov class			Scrapped Incomplete 1961	
Tallinn	Sverdlov class			Scrapped Incomplete 1961	
Varyag	Sverdlov class			Scrapped Incomplete 1961	
Ordzhonikidze	Sverdlov class	1952	1952-1972	Scrapped 1972	
Aleksandr Nevsky	Sverdlov class	1952	1952-1989	Scrapped 1989	
Admiral Lazarev	Sverdlov class	1952	1952-1986	Scrapped 1986	
Shcherbakov	Sverdlov class			Scrapped Incomplete 1961	
Dzerzhinsky	Sverdlov class	1952	1952-1989	Scrapped 1989	
Admiral Nakhimov	Sverdlov class	1953	1953-1961	Scrapped 1961	
Mikhail Kutuzov	Sverdlov class	1954	1954-2000	Museum ship at Novorossiysk	
Admiral Kornilov	Sverdlov class			Scrapped Incomplete 1957	
Oktyabrskaya Revolyutsia	Sverdlov class	1954	1954-1987	Scrapped 1987	
Murmansk	Sverdlov class	1955	1955-1992	Ran aground 1992, Scrapped in place 2013	
Arkhangelsk	Sverdlov class			Scrapped Incomplete 1961	
Vladivostok	Sverdlov class			Scrapped Incomplete 1961	
Groznyy	Kynda class	1962	1962-1991	Scrapped 1991	
Admiral Fokin	Kynda class	1964	1964-1993	Scrapped 1995	
Admiral Golovko	Kynda class	1964	1964-2002	Scrapped 2004	
Varyag	Kynda class	1965	1965-1990	Scrapped 1990	
Admiral Zozulya	Kresta I class	1967	1967-1994	Scrapped 1995	
Vladivostok	Kresta I class	1969	1969-1991	Scrapped 1991	
Vitse-Admiral Drozd	Kresta I class	1968	1968-1990	Sunk 1992	
Sevastopol	Kresta I class	1969	1969-1989	Scrapped 1989	
Kronstadt	Kresta II class	1969	1969-1991	Scrapped 1993	
Admiral Isakov	Kresta II class	1970	1970-1993	Sunk 1994	
Admiral Nakhimov	Kresta II class	1971	1971-1991	Scrapped 1993	
Admiral Makarov	Kresta II class	1972	1972-1992	Scrapped 1994	
Khabarovsk	Kresta II class	1973	1973-1992	Scrapped 1994	
Admiral Oktyabrsky	Kresta II class	1973	1973-1993	Scrapped 1993	
Admiral Isachenkov	Kresta II class	1974	1974-1992	Scrapped 1992	
Marshal Timoshenko	Kresta II class	1975	1975-1992	Scrapped 1994	
Vasily Chapayev	Kresta II class	1976	1976-1993	Scrapped 1993	
Admiral Yumashev	Kresta II class	1977	1977-1992	Scrapped 1994	
Nikolayev	Kara class	1971	1971-1992	Scrapped 1994	
Ochakov	Kara class	1973	1973-2011	Scuttled 2014, As of 2023 still laid up awaiting scrapping	
Kerch	Kara class	1974	1974-2020	Scrapped 2020	
Azov	Kara class	1975	1975-1998	Scrapped 2000	
Petropavlovsk	Kara class	1976	1976-1992	Scrapped 1996	
Tashkent	Kara class	1977	1977-1992	Scrapped 1994	
Vladivostok	Kara class	1979	1979-1994	Scrapped 1994	
Slava	Slava class	1982	1982-2022	Sunk 2022	
Marshal Ustinov	Slava class	1986	1986–Present	In Service	
Varyag	Slava class	1989	1989–Present	In Service	
Ukraina	Slava class	1990	1990-Present	Laid up in Ukraine, Incomplete	
Oktyabrskaya Revolutsiya	Slava class			Cancelled and disassembled on the way in 1990	

== Coastal defense ships ==
Name	Class	Built	In service	Status	Image
Vyborg	Väinämöinen class	1929	1947-1966	Scrapped 1966	
EK-31	Shimushu class	1938	1947-1959	Recommissioned as dispatch ship PS-25 1948; Recommissioned as repair ship PM-74 1957; Scrapped 1959	
EK-47	Ukuru class	1944	1947-1969	Recommissioned as oceanographic ship Nord 1948; Recommissioned as repair ship PM-62 1955; Scrapped 1969	
EK-41	Ukuru class	1945	1947-1961	Used as target ship TsL-41 1948; Recommissioned as oceanographic ship Val 1949; Scrapped 1961	
EK-43	Type C	1944	1947-1964	Recommissioned as oceanographic ship Ostrovnoy 1948; Scrapped 1964	
EK-45	Type C	1944	1947-1969	Used as target ship TsL-45 1948; Recommissioned as repair ship PM-63 1955; Scrapped 1969	
EK-39	Type C	1944	1947-1960	Used as target ship TsL-39 1948; Recommissioned as oceanographic ship Sozh 1949; Scrapped 1960	
EK-34	Type C	1944	1947-1960	Used as target ship TsL-34 1948; Recommissioned as oceanographic ship Khersones 1949; Scrapped 1960	
EK-40	Type C	1944	1947-1958	Used as target ship TsL-40 1948; Recommissioned as rescue ship Zhiguli 1949; Scrapped 1958	
EK-35	Type C	1944	1947-1958	Used as target ship TsL-35 1948; Recommissioned as oceanographic ship Siurkum 1949; Scrapped 1958	
EK-32	Type D	1944	1947-1958	Used as target ship TsL-63 1954; Recommissioned as repair ship PM-75 1957; Scrapped 1958	
EK-42	Type D	1944	1947-1959	Used as target ship TsL-42 1948; Recommissioned as dispatch ship Abakan 1949; Scrapped 1959	
EK-36	Type D	1944	1947-1958	Recommissioned as dispatch ship Naryn 1954; Scrapped 1958	
EK-44	Type D	1944	1947-1955	Used as target ship TsL-44 1948; Recommissioned as guard ship SKR-49 1954; Ceded to PLA Navy 1955, fate unknown	
EK-37	Type D	1944	1947-1958	Recommissioned as dispatch ship Murgab 1954; Scrapped 1958	
EK-46	Type D	1944	1947-1960	Used as target ship TsL-46 1948; Scrapped 1960	
EK-38	Type D	1944	1947-1955	Used as target ship TsL-38 1948; Recommissioned as dispatch ship Arkhara 1949; Recommissioned as guard ship SKR-48 1954; Ceded to PLA Navy 1955; Scrapped 1987	
EK-33	Type D	1944	1947-1958	Recommissioned as dispatch ship Turgai 1954; Scrapped 1958	

== Amphibious Assault / BDK, SDK ==
Name	Class	Built	In service	Status	Image
BDK-65 Saratov	Tapir-class	1966	1966-2022	Sunk on 24 March 2022, during the 2022 Russian invasion of Ukraine	
BDK-6	Tapir-class	1966	1966-1992	Scrapped 1995	
BDK-13	Tapir-class	1967	1967-1994		
BDK-62	Tapir-class	1967	1967-1997		
BDK-66 Sergey Lazo	Tapir-class	1968	1968-1994		
BDK-69 Orsk	Tapir-class	1968	1968–present	In service	
BDK-77	Tapir-class	1969	1969-1994		
Donetsky Shakhtyor	Tapir-class	1969	1969-2002		
BDK-100 Krasnaya Presnya	Tapir-class	1970	1970-1993	Sunk 1995	
BDK-104 Ilya Azarov	Tapir-class	1971	1971-2004	scrapped 2004	
Aleksandr Tortsev	Tapir-class	1971	1971-1994		
Pyotr Ilyichev	Tapir-class	1972	1972-1993		
Nikolai Vilkov	Tapir-class	1974	1974–present	In service	
Nikolai Filchenkov	Tapir-class	1975	1975–present	In service	
Nikolai Golubkov	Tapir-class			Never completed	
(SDK-47) BDK-47	Ropucha-class	1974	1974-1994		
(SDK-48) BDK-48	Ropucha-class	1975	1975-1994		
(SDK-63) BDK-63	Ropucha-class	1975	1975-1994		
(SDK-90) BDK-90	Ropucha-class	1975	1975-1994		
(SDK-91) BDK-91 Olenegorsky Gornyak	Ropucha-class	1976	1976-brought on stand mod. II	Damaged on 4 August by Ukrainian army.	
(SDK-181) BDK-181	Ropucha-class	1976	1976-1994		
(SDK-182) BDK-182 Kondopoga	Ropucha-class	1976	1976-brought on stand mod. II	In Service with Russia	
(SDK-183) BDK-183 Kotlas	Ropucha-class	1977	1977-2005		
(SDK-197) BDK-197	Ropucha-class	1977	1977-1994		
(SDK-200) BDK-200	Ropucha-class	1977	1977-1993		
(SDK-55) BDK-55 Aleksandr Otrakovsky	Ropucha-class	1978	1978–Present	In Service with Russia	
(SDK-119) BDK-119	Ropucha-class	1979	1979-2018	Sunk 2018	
Oslyabya	Ropucha-class	1981	1981–Present	In Service with Russia	
Admiral Nevelskoy	Ropucha-class	1982	1982–Present	In Service with Russia	
Minsk	Ropucha-class	1983	1983–Present	In Service with Russia	
BDK-102 Kaliningrad	Ropucha-class	1984	1984–Present	In Service with Russia	
Georgiy Pobedonosets	Ropucha-class	1985	1985–Present	In Service with Russia	
Aleksandr Shabalin	Ropucha-class	1985	1985–Present	In Service with Russia	
(SDK-64) Tsezar Kunikov	Ropucha-class	1986	1986–Present	In Service with Russia	
(SDK-46) Novocherkassk	Ropucha-class	1987	1987–Present	In Service with Russia	
Yamal	Ropucha-class	1988	1988–Present	In Service with Russia	
Azov	Ropucha-class	1990	1990–Present	In Service with Russia	
Peresvet	Ropucha-class	1991	1991–Present	In Service with Russia	
Korolyov	Ropucha-class	1991	1991–Present	In Service with Russia	
Ivan Rogov	Ivan Rogov class	1978	1978-1996		
Aleksandr Nikolayev	Ivan Rogov class	1982	1982-2006	Undergoing scrapping as of 2023	
Mitrofan Moskalenko	Ivan Rogov class	1990	1990-2006	Undergoing scrapping as of 2023	

- Ropucha class
- Polnocny class

== Battlecruisers / RKR ==
Name	Class	Built	In service	Status	Image
Kirov	Kirov class	1974	1980-1990	Laid up awaiting Scrapping	
Frunze	Kirov class	1978	1984-1999	Scrapping began in April 2021	
Kalinin	Kirov class	1983	1988–present	Undergoing refit	
Yuri Andropov	Kirov class	1986	1998–present	Flagship of the Russian North Fleet	
Dzerzhinskiy	Kirov class		Cancelled 1990		

== Battleships ==
Name	Class	Built	In service	Status	Image
Arkhangelsk	Revenge class	1914	1916-1949	Scrapped 1949	
Novorossiysk	Conte di Cavour class	1910	1914-1955	Sunk 1955	
Frunze	Gangut class	1909	1914-1949	Scrapped	
Marat	Gangut class	1909	1915-1955	Scrapped	
Oktyabrskaya Revolutsiya	Gangut class	1909	1915-1952	Scrapped	
Parizhskaya Kommuna	Gangut class	1909	1914-1956	Scrapped	

== Aircraft carriers/Aviation cruisers / TAKR ==
Name	Class	Built	In service	Status	Image
Moskva	Moskva class	1964	1967-1996	Scrapped in Greece 1996	
Leningrad	Moskva class	1965	1969-1991	Scrapped in India 1995	
Kiev	Moskva class	1967	Never Completed	Cancelled 1969	
Kiev	Kiev class	1970	1975-1993	Theme park in Tianjin since 1 May 2004.	
Minsk	Kiev class	1972	1978-1993	Sold to China in 1995; sold again and placed in Naval museum in Jiangsu, China since 2016, severely damaged by fire in 2024	
Novorossiysk	Kiev class	1975	1982-1993	Scrapped at Pohang, 1997	
Admiral Gorshkov	Kiev class	1978	1987-1996 2013–present	In service with India as INS Vikramaditya from 2013	
Admiral Kuznetsov	Kuznetsov class	1982	1991–present	In service with Russian navy	
Varyag	Kuznetsov class	1985	2012–present	In service with China as Liaoning	
Ulyanovsk	Ulyanovsk class	1988	Never Completed	Scrapped 1992 40% complete	
Unnamed	Ulyanovsk class		Cancelled	Cancelled 1991	

== Submarines ==
- List of Soviet and Russian submarine classes
- Dekabrist class
  - D-1 Dekabrist (1928)
  - D-2 Narodovolets (1929)
  - D-3 Krasnogvardyeyets (1929)
  - D-4 Revolutsioner (1929)
  - D-5 Spartakovets (1929)
  - D-6 Yakobinets (1930)
- L type
  - L-1 Leninets (1931)
  - L-2 Stalinets (1931)
  - L-3 Frunzenets (1931)
  - L-4 Garibaldets (1931)
  - L-5 Chartist (1931)
  - L-6 Carbonari (1931)
  - L-7 Voroshilovets (1935)
  - L-8 Dzerzhinets (1935)
  - L-9 Kirovets (1935)
  - L-10 Menzhinets (1936)
  - L11 Sverdlovets (1936)
  - L-12 Molotovets (1936)
  - L-13 (1936)
  - L-14 (1936)
  - L-15 (1936)
  - L-16 (1937)
  - L-17 (1937)
  - L-18 (1938)
  - L-19 (1938)
  - L-20 (1940)
  - L-21 (1940)
  - L-22 (1939)
  - L-23 (1940)
  - L-24 (1941)
- ShCh type
- Pravda class
  - P-1 Pravda (1934)
  - P-3 Iskra (1934)
  - P-2 Zvevda (1935)
- S type
  - S-13
- M type
  - M-200
- K type
- A (AG) type
- Kalev class (ex-Estonian)
  - Lembit
  - Kalev
- Ronis class (ex-Latvian)
  - Ronis
  - Spidola
- S class (on loan 1944 from the UK)
  - V-1 (HMS Sunfish)
- U class (on loan 1944–1950 from the UK)
  - V-2 (HMS Unbroken)
  - V-3 (HMS Unison)
  - V-4 (HMS Ursula)
- TS-1 (ex-Romanian NMS Rechinul)
- TS-2 (ex-Romanian NMS Marsuinul)
- TS-3 (ex-Romanian NMS Delfinul)
- CB-class (ex-Italian, ex-Romanian)
  - TM-4 (1944)
  - TM-5 (1944)
  - TM-6 (1944)
  - TM-7 (1944)

=== SS/SSK / PL ===
- Zulu class (Project 611)
- Whiskey class (Project 613)
- Quebec class (Project 615)
- Romeo class (Project 633)
- Foxtrot class (Project 641)
  - B-37 (1959)
  - B-427 (1971)
- Tango class (Project 641B Som)
- Kilo class (Project 877 Paltus)
  - B-248 (1980)
  - B-260 (1981)
  - B-227 (1983)
  - B-229 (1983)
  - B-404 (1983)
  - B-401 (1984)
  - B-402 (1984)
  - B-405 Tyumenskiy Komsomolets (1984)
  - B-470 (1985)
  - B-806 (1986)
  - B-439 (1986)
  - B-445 (1988)
  - B-808 (1988)
  - B-394 (1988)
  - B-800 Vologodskij Komsomolets (1989)
  - B-464 (1990)
  - B-459 (1990)
  - B-871 (1990)
  - B-471 (1990)
  - B-494 (1990)
  - B-187 (1991)
  - B-177 (1991)
  - B-190 (1992)
- Losos class (Project 865 Piran'ya)
  - MS-520 (1988)
  - MS-521 (1990)

=== SSB / PLRB ===
- Zulu IV class (Project B611)
  - B-67 (1956)
- Zulu V class (Project AB611)
  - B-62 (1958)
  - B-73 (1957)
  - B-78 (1957)
  - B-79 (1957)
  - B-89 (1957)
- Golf I/II class (Project 629/629A)
  - B-92 (K-92, B-96)(1959)
  - B-40 (K-72, B-372) (1959)
  - B-41 (K-79, B-372) (1959)
  - B-42 (K-83, B-83, BS-83) (1959)
  - B-93 (K-126, B-126) (1959)
  - B-125 (K-107, B-107, BS-107) (1960)
  - B-45 (K-88, B-183) (1960)
  - K-61 (B-29, B-167, BS-167) (1960)
  - B-156 (K-113, BS-113, RZS-97, PZS-65) (1960)
  - B-103 (K-129) (1960) [famous as target of CIA recovery operation using the Hughes Glomar Explorer]
  - B-109 (K-136, BS-136) (1960)
  - B-113 (K-139, B-139) (1961)
  - B-46 (K-75, B-575) (1961)
  - B-95 (K-36, K-100, B-106) (1961)
  - B-48 (K-91, B-91) (1961)
  - K-93 (B-93) (1961)
  - K-110 (B-110, BS-110) (1961)
  - K-142 (B-142) (1962)
  - B-51 (K-99, B B-99) (1962)
  - K-163 (B-163) (1962)
- Golf III class (Project 601) (converted from Golf II)
  - B-149 (K-118, B-118, RZS-439) (1960)
- Golf IV class (Project 605) (converted from Golf II)
  - B-121 (K-102) (1959)
- Golf V class (Project 619) (converted from Golf II)
  - K-153 (BS-153) (1961)

=== SSG / PLRK ===
- Whiskey class Single Cylinder (Project P613)
  - S-146 (1958)
- Whiskey class Twin Cylinder (Project 644)
  - S-69 (1960)
  - S-80 (1960)
  - S-44 (1960)
  - S-46 (1960)
  - S-159 (1960)
  - S-162 (1960)
- Whiskey class Long Bin (Project 665)
  - S-64 (1961)
  - S-155 (1961)
  - S-61 (1962)
  - S-142 (1963)
  - S-152 (1963)
  - S-164 (1963)
- Juliett class (Project 651)
  - K-156 (1963)
  - K-85 (1964)
  - K-70 (1964)
  - K-24 (1965)
  - K-68 (1965)
  - K-77 (1965)
  - K-81 (1965)
  - K-63 (1966)
  - K-58 (1966)
  - K-73 (1966)
  - K-67 (1967)
  - K-78 (1967)
  - K-203 (1967)
  - K-304 (1968)
  - K-318 (1968)
  - K-120 (1968)

=== SSA (auxiliary) ===
- Bravo class (Project 690 Kefal)
  - SS-368 (1967)
  - SS-226 (1968)
  - SS-256 (1968)
  - SS-310 (1970)
- India class (Project 940 Lenok)
  - BS-486 Komsomolets Uzbekistana
  - BS-257
- Beluga class (Project 1710 Makrel)
  - S-553 Forel
- Lima class (Project 1840)
  - BS-555

=== SSN / PLA ===
- November class (Project 627/627A/645 Kit)
  - K-3 Leninsky Komsomol (1958)
  - K-5 (1959)
  - K-8 (1960)
  - K-14 (1959)
  - K-52 (1960)
  - K-21 (1961)
  - K-11 (1961)
  - K-133 (1962)
  - K-181 (1962)
  - K-115 (1962)
  - K-27 (1962)
  - K-159 (1963)
  - K-42 (1963)
  - K-50 (1964)
- Victor I class (Project 671 Yorsch)
  - K-38 (1967)
  - K-69 (1968)
  - K-147 (1968)
  - K-53 (1969)
  - K-306 (1969)
  - K-323 50 years of the USSR (1970)
  - K-370 (1970)
  - K-438 (1971)
  - K-367 (1971)
  - K-314 (1972)
  - K-398 (1972)
  - K-454 (1973)
  - K-462 (1973)
  - K-469 (1974)
  - K-481 (1974)
- Victor II class (Project 671RT Syomga)
  - K-387 (1972)
  - K-371 (1974)
  - K-495 (1975)
  - K-513 (1976)
  - K-467 (1976)
  - K-488 (1978)
  - K-517 (1978)
  - K-505 (Not completed)
- Victor III class (Project 671RTM Shchuka)
  - K-524 (1977)
  - K-247 (1978)
  - K-507 (1979)
  - K-492 (1979)
  - K-412 (1979)
  - K-254 (1979)
  - K-502 (1979)
  - K-251 (1980)
  - K-255 (1980)
  - K-324 (1980)
  - K-305 (1981)
  - K-355 (1981)
  - K-527 (1981)
  - K-298 (1982)
  - K-360 (1982)
  - K-218 (1983)
  - K-242 (1983)
  - K-358 Murmansky Komsomolets (1983)
  - K-264 (1983)
  - K-299 (1984)
  - K-264 (1984)
  - K-244 (1985)
  - K-292 (1987)
  - K-388 (1988)
  - K-138 (1990)
  - K-414 (1990)
  - K-448 (1992)
- Alfa class (Project 705 Lira)
  - K-64 (1971)
  - K-123 (1977)
  - K-316 (1978)
  - K-432 (1978)
  - K-373 (1979)
  - K-493 (1981)
  - K-463 (1981)
- Mike class (Project 685 Plavnik)
  - K-278 Komsomolets (1983)
- Sierra I class (Project 945 Barrakuda)
  - K-239 (1984)
  - K-276 (1987)
- Sierra II class (Project 945A Kondor)
  - K-534 (1990)
  - K-336 (1993)
- Akula I/Bars class
- Akula II class

=== SSBN / PLARB ===
- Hotel class (Project 658)
  - K-19 (1959)
  - K-33 (1969)
  - K-55 (1962)
  - K-178 (1962)
  - K-40 (1962)
  - K-16 (1963)
  - K-145 (1963)
  - K-149 (1964)
- Yankee I class
  - K-140 Leninets
  - K-26
  - K-32
  - K-216
  - K-207
  - K-210
  - K-249
  - K-253
  - K-395
  - K-408
  - K-411
  - K-418
  - K-420
  - K-423
  - K-426
  - K-415
  - K-403
  - K-245
  - K-214
  - K-219
  - K-228
  - K-241
  - K-444
  - K-399
  - K-434
  - K-236
  - K-389
  - K-252
  - K-258
  - K-446
  - K-451
  - K-436
  - K-430
- Yankee II class (1968-?)
- Yankee Sidecar class conversion
- Yankee Pod class conversion
- Yankee Stretch class conversion
  - K-219 (?-1986)
- Delta I class (Project 667B Murena)
  - K-279 (1972)
  - K-447 (1973)
  - K-450 (1973)
  - K-385 (1973)
  - K-457 (1973)
  - K-465 (1974)
  - K-460 (1974)
  - K-472 (1974)
  - K-475 (1974)
  - K-171 (1974)
  - K-366 (1974)
  - K-417 (1975)
  - K-477 (1975)
  - K-497 (1976)
  - K-500 (1976)
  - K-512 70 years of the Komsomol (1977)
  - K-523 (1977)
  - K-530 (1977)
- Delta II class (Project 667BD Murena-M)
  - K-182 60 years of the Great October (1975)
  - K-92 (1975)
  - K-193 (1975)
  - K-421 (1975)
- Delta III class (Project 667BDR Kalmar)
  - K-242 (1976)
  - K-441 (1976)
  - K-449 (1976)
  - K-455 (1976)
  - K-490 (1977)
  - K-487 (1977)
  - K-496 (1977)
  - K-506 (1978)
  - K-211 (1979)
  - K-223 (1979)
  - K-180 (1980)
  - K-433 (1980)
  - K-129 (1981)
  - K-44 (1982)
- Delta IV class (Project 667BDRM Delfin)
  - K-51 (1984)
  - K-84 (1985)
  - K-64 (1986)
  - K-114 (1987)
  - K-117 (1988)
  - K-18 (1989)
  - K-407 (1990)
- Typhoon class (Project 941 Akula)
  - TK-208 (1981)
  - TK-202 (1983)
  - TK-12 (1984)
  - TK-13 (1985)
  - TK-17 (1987)
  - TK-20 (1989)

=== SSGN / PLARK ===
- Echo I class (Project 659)
  - K-45 (1961)
  - K-59 (1961)
  - K-66 (1961)
  - K-122 (1962)
  - K-151 (1963)
- Echo II class (Project 675)
  - K-166 (1963)
  - K-104 (1963)
  - K-170 (K-86) (1963)
  - K-175 (1963)
  - K-184 (1964)
  - K-172 (1964)
  - K-47 (1964)
  - K-1 (1964)
  - K-28 (K-428) (1964)
  - K-35 (1965)
  - K-189 (K-144) (1965)
  - K-74 (1965)
  - K-22 (1965)
  - K-90 (K-111) (1965)
  - K-31 (K-431) (1965)
  - K-116 (1965)
  - K-57 (K-557) (1965)
  - K-125 (1965)
  - K-48 (1965)
  - K-128 (K-62) (1966)
  - K-56 (1966)
  - K-131 (1966)
  - K-10 (1966)
  - K-135 (1966)
  - K-94 (K-204) (1966)
  - K-108 (1967)
  - K-7 (1967)
  - K-23 (1967)
  - K-34 (K-134) (1968)
- Papa class (Project 661 Anchar)
  - K-222 (1970)
- Yankee Notch class conversion
  - K-253 (1969)
  - K-395 (1969)
  - K-408 (1969)
  - K-423 (1970)
- Charlie I class (Project 670 Skat)
  - K-43 (1967)
  - K-87 (1968)
  - K-25 (1968)
  - K-121 (1969)
  - K-313 (1969)
  - K-308 (1970)
  - K-302 (1970)
  - K-320 (1971)
  - K-325 (1971)
  - K-429 (1972)
  - K-201 (1972)
- Charlie II class (Project 670M Chaika)
  - K-452 (1973)
  - K-458 (1975)
  - K-479 (1977)
  - K-503 (1978)
  - K-209 (1980)
- Oscar I class (Project 949 Granit)
  - K-525 (1980)
  - K-206 Minskiy Komsomolets (1983)
- Oscar II class (Project 949A Antey)
  - K-148 (1986)
  - K-173 (1986)
  - K-132 (1988)
  - K-119 (1989)
  - K-410 (1990)
  - K-442 (1990)
  - K-456 Kasatka (1992)
  - K-266 Severodvinsk (1992)

=== SSAN (auxiliary) ===
- Uniform class (Project 1910 Kashalot)
  - AS-13 (1986)
  - AS-15 (1991)

== Other ==
- SSV-33 (Pacific Fleet communications ship, based upon the Kirov-class battlecruiser hull)
- Lun-class ekranoplan (Commissioned as a ship and used as one).
- VMF Kommuna is a salvage vessel, and having been launched in 1915, one of the oldest naval vessels still in service in a major navy of the world.
- Dunay a tall ship built in Italy as the Cristoforo Colombo and acquired as war reparation.
- STS Sedov tall ship built as Magdalene Vinnen II also acquired as war reparation.
- Marshal Nedelin class missile range instrumentation/space event support ship
- Onega class acoustic trials ships
- Potok/Modified T-58 class weapons trials ship
- T-43 class acoustic trials ships
- Kashtan-class salvage vessel, a class of salvage vessel/submersible support

=== Missile and munitions transports ===
- Sadko class
- Amga class
- Lama class
- Muna class

=== Electronic surveillance ships ===
- Balzam class
- Okean class (modified trawler)
- Primor'ye class (modified fish factory ships)
- Vishnya class
- Yug class
- Alpinist class

=== Oceanographic research ships ===
- Nikolay Zubov class (AGOR & AGI)
- Sibirykov class
- Yug class

=== Survey ships ===
- Moma class (AGS)
- Samara class (AGS)
- Finik class
- Biya class
- Kamenka class
- Vinograd class

== See also ==
- List of ships of World War II
- List of ships of Russia by project number
