= Soviet destroyer Sovremenny =

Sovremenny-class destroyer of the Soviet Navy

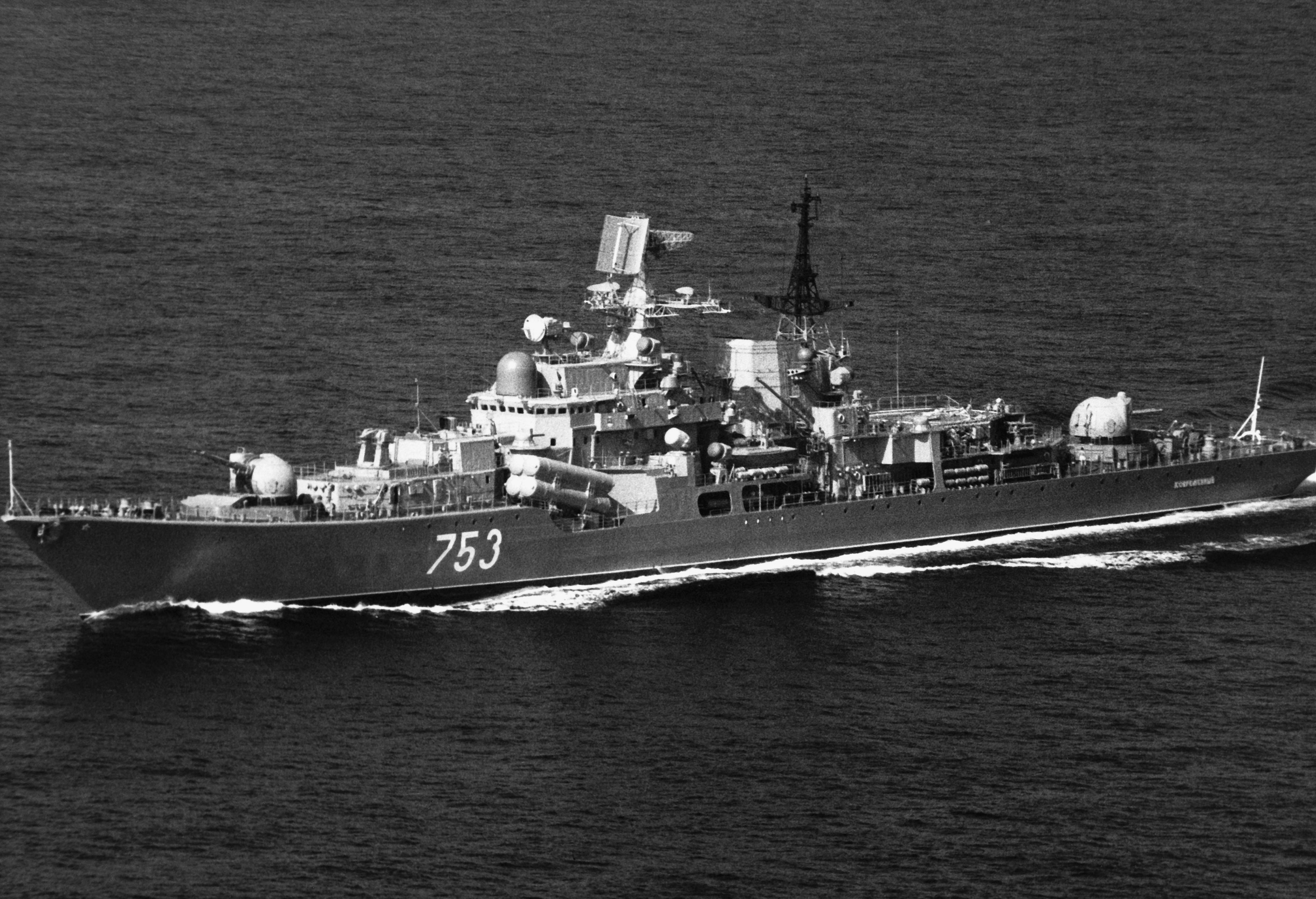
- Sovremenny underway in 1982

History

Soviet Union → Russia
- Name: Sovremenny; (Современный)
- Namesake: Modern in Russian
- Builder: Zhdanov Shipyard, Leningrad
- Laid down: 3 March 1976
- Launched: 18 November 1978
- Commissioned: 25 December 1980
- Decommissioned: 15 November 1998
- Home port: Kaliningrad
- Identification: Pennant number: 402, 420, 426, 431, 441, 618, 670, 680, 753, 760
- Fate: Scrapped in Murmansk, 2003

General characteristics
- Class & type: Sovremenny-class destroyer
- Displacement: 6,600 tons standard, 8,480 tons full load
- Length: 156 m (511 ft 10 in)
- Beam: 17.3 m (56 ft 9 in)
- Draught: 6.5 m (21 ft 4 in)
- Propulsion: 2 shaft steam turbines, 4 boilers, 75,000 kW (100,000 hp), 2 fixed propellers, 2 turbo generators, and 2 diesel generators
- Speed: 32.7 knots (60.6 km/h; 37.6 mph)
- Range: 3,920 nmi (7,260 km; 4,510 mi) at 18 knots (33 km/h; 21 mph); 1,345 nmi (2,491 km; 1,548 mi) at 33 knots (61 km/h; 38 mph)
- Complement: 350
- Sensors & processing systems: Radar: Air target acquisition radar, 3 × navigation radars, 130 mm gun fire-control radars, 30 mm air-defence gun fire control radar; Sonar: Active and passive under-keel sonar; ES: Tactical situation plotting board, anti-ship missile fire control system, air defence, missile fire-control system, and torpedo fire control system
- Electronic warfare & decoys: 2 PK-2 decoy dispensers (200 rockets)
- Armament: Guns: 4 (2 × 2) AK-130 130 mm naval guns; 4 × 30 mm AK-630 CIWS; Missiles; 8 (2 × 4) (SS-N-22 'Sunburn') anti-ship missiles; 48 (2 × 24) SA-N-7 'Gadfly' surface-to-air missiles; Anti-submarine: 2 × 2 533 mm torpedo tubes; 2 × 6 RBU-1000 300 mm anti-submarine rocket launchers
- Aircraft carried: 1× Ka-27 series helicopter
- Aviation facilities: Helipad

Sovremenny was the lead ship of Sovremenny-class destroyers of the Soviet and later Russian navy.

== Development and design ==
The project began in the late 1960s when it was becoming obvious to the Soviet Navy that naval guns still had an important role particularly in support of amphibious landings, but existing gun cruisers and destroyers were showing their age. A new design was started, employing a new 130 mm automatic gun turret.

The ships were 156 metres (512 ft) in length, with a beam of 17.3 metres (56 ft 9 in) and a draught of 6.5 metres (21 ft 4 in).

== Construction and career ==
Sovremenny was laid down on 3 March 1976 and launched on 18 November 1978 by Zhdanov Shipyard in Leningrad. She was commissioned on 25 December 1980.

From 15 January 1985, the ship was on active service in the Mediterranean Sea together with the aircraft carrier Kiev, the cruisers Vitse-Admiral Drozd and Marshal Timoshenko, and the destroyer Otchayanny.

During a friendly visit to the port of Split, Yugoslavia, she damaged her port propeller

By 4 June 1985, on returning to Severomorsk, she had sailed 19,985 nautical miles.

During the competitive artillery fire of the ships of the KUG of the 56th destroyer brigade of the 7th operational squadron, which was held on 9 October 1986, she won the Navy Main Committee Prize for artillery training as part of the KUG.

On 15 December 1988, Sovremenny was put into the 2nd category reserve.

On 25 May 1989, she was delivered for repair and modernization to the shipyard No. 35 (Rosta), however, due to insufficient funding, the modernization was extremely slow.

As a result, after 1991 it was decided to exclude the ship from the lists of the fleet, which happened on 15 November 1998, on the same day the naval flag was lowered on the ship.

The technical readiness of the destroyer on 1 August 1997 was 72% and by the time of decommissioning at 86%. Disassembled in Murmansk in 2003.

== Gallery ==
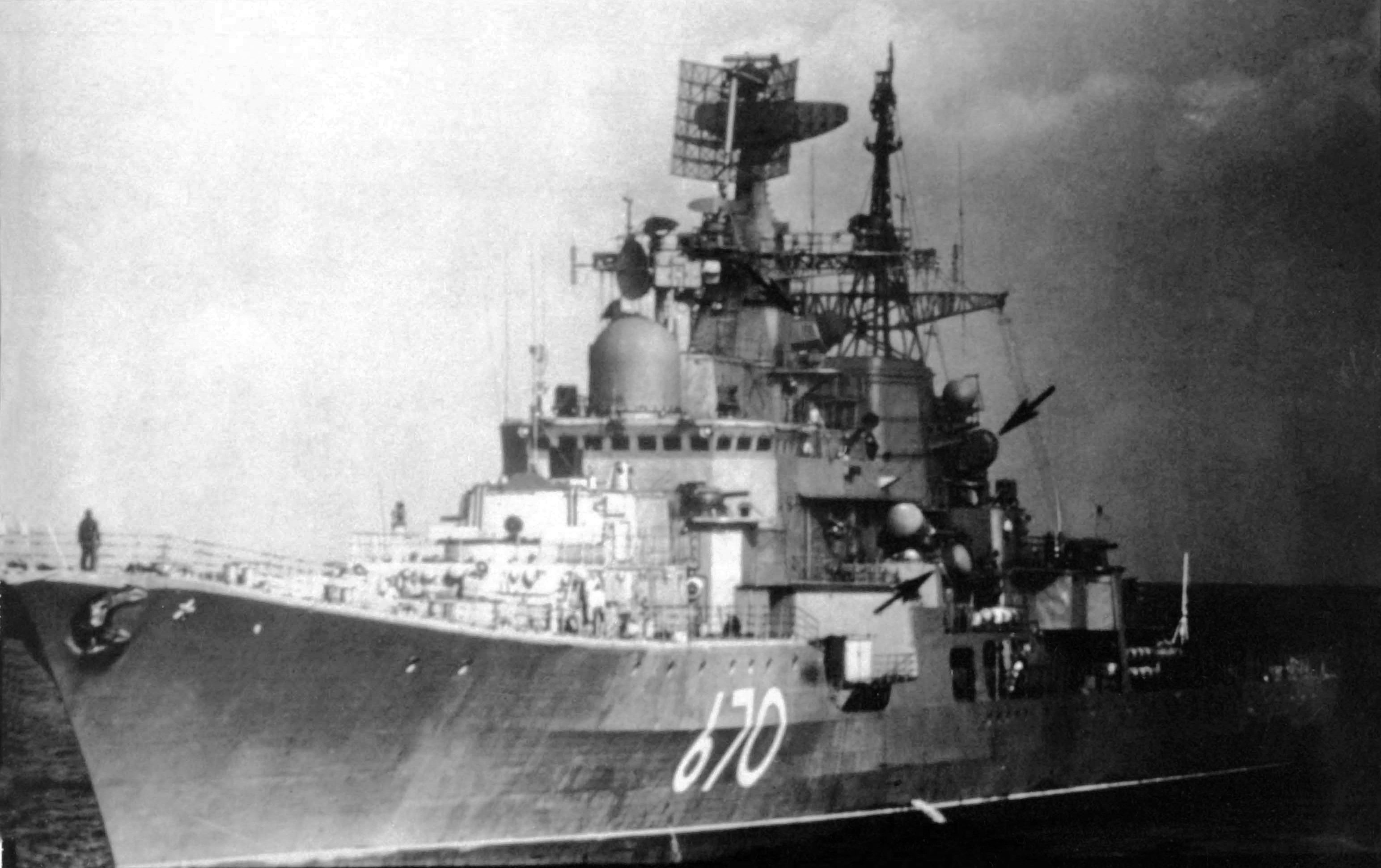
Sovremenny underway in April 1982.

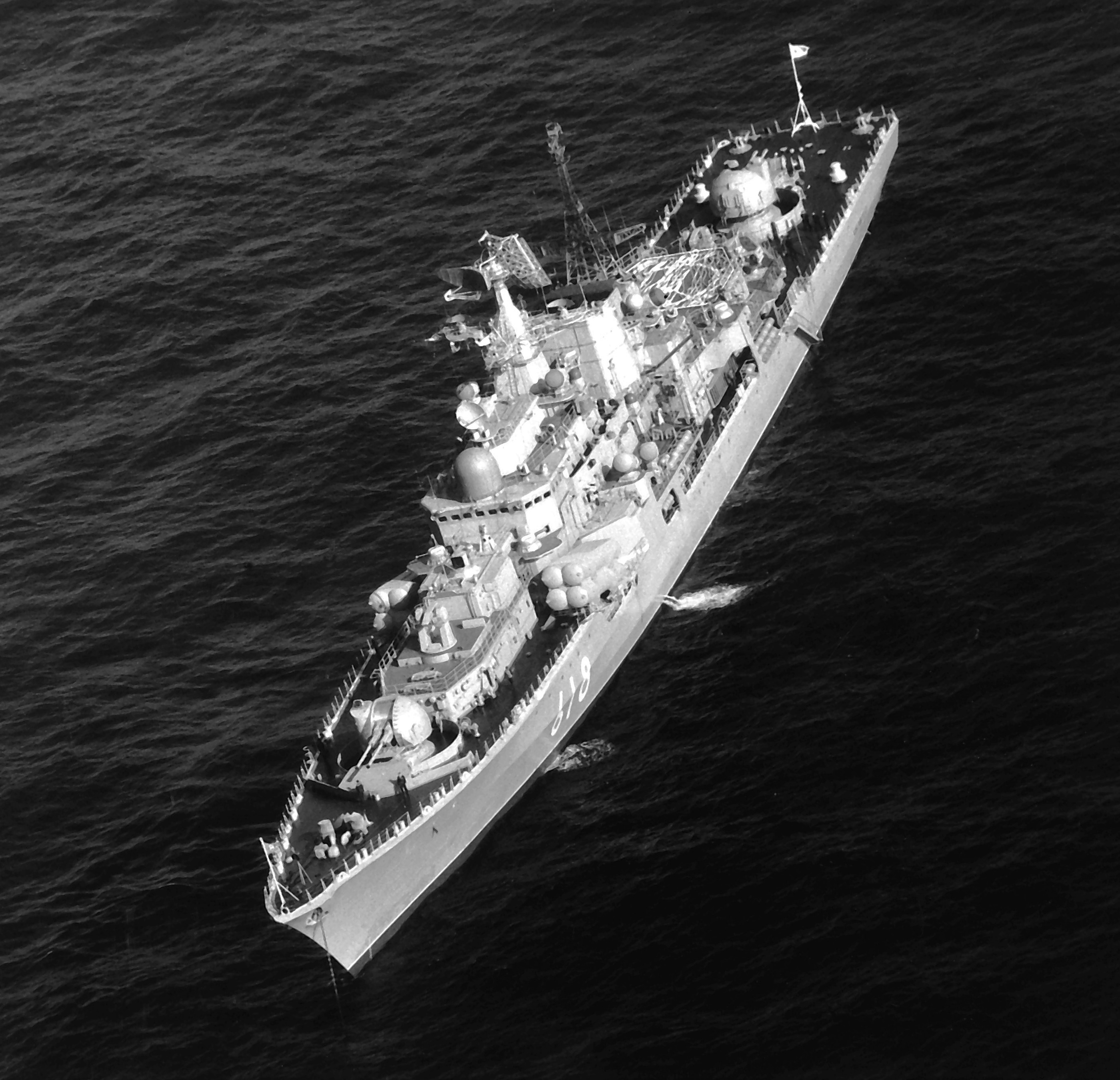
Sovremenny underway in August 1982.

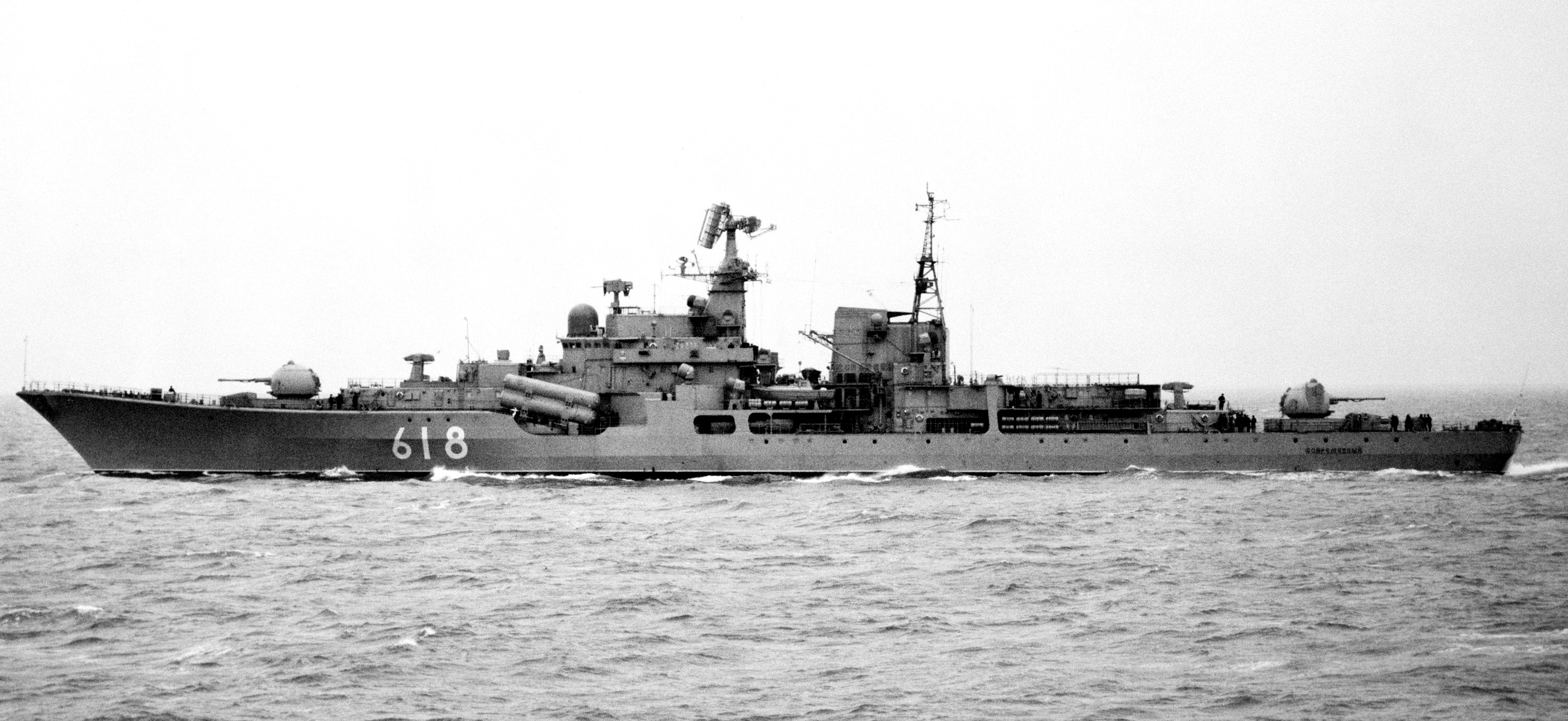
Sovremenny underway in August 1982.

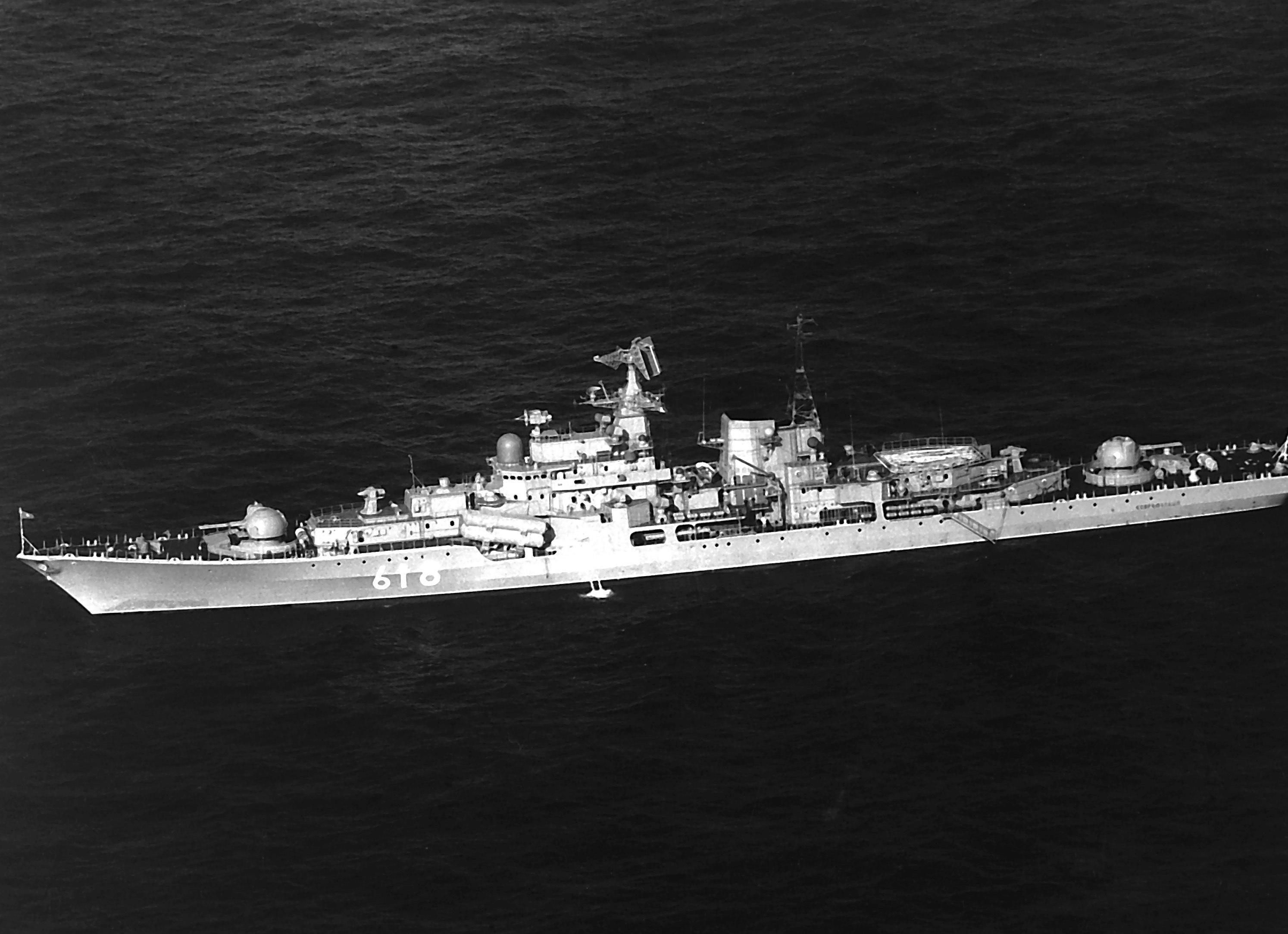
Sovremenny underway in August 1982.

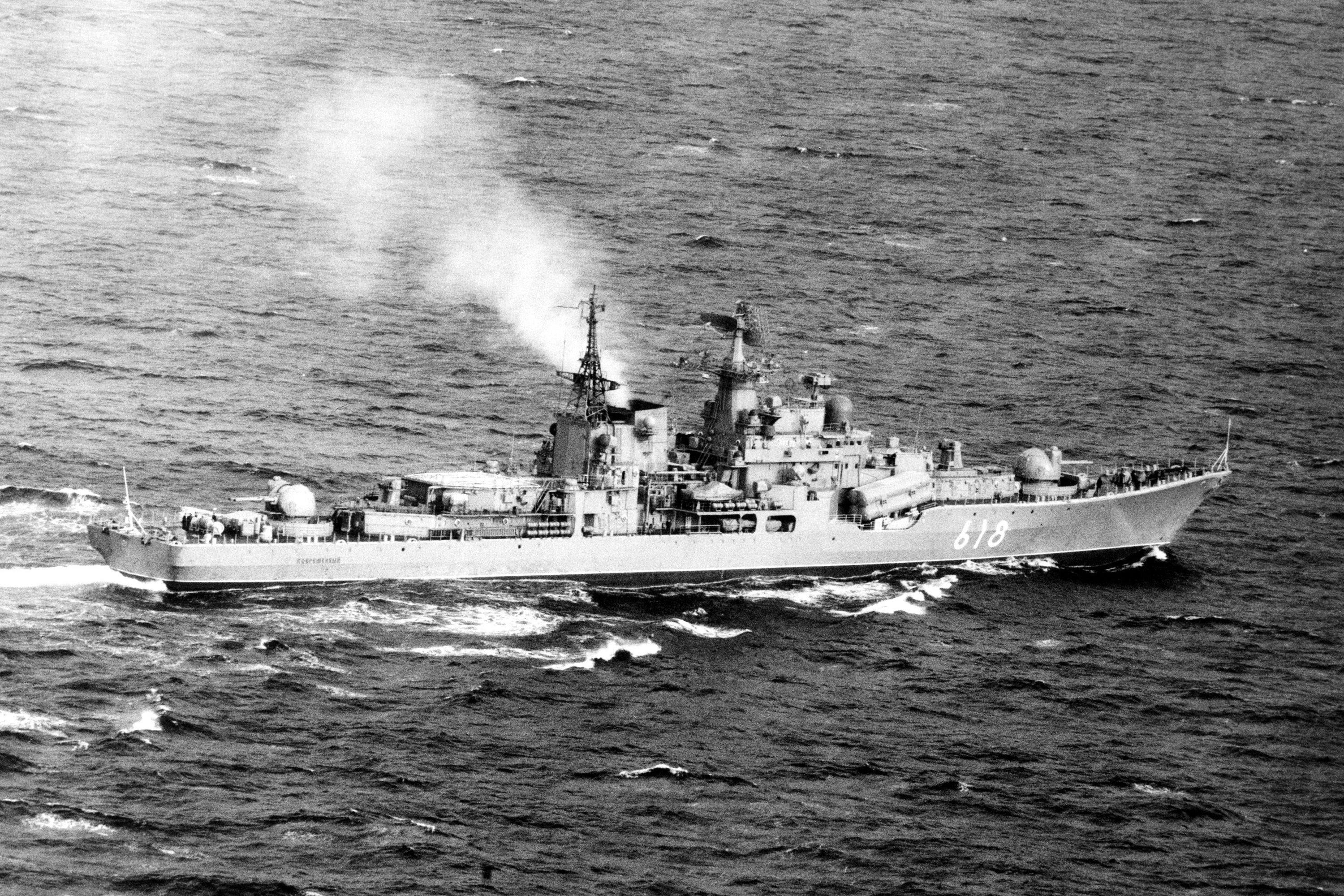
Sovremenny underway in August 1982.

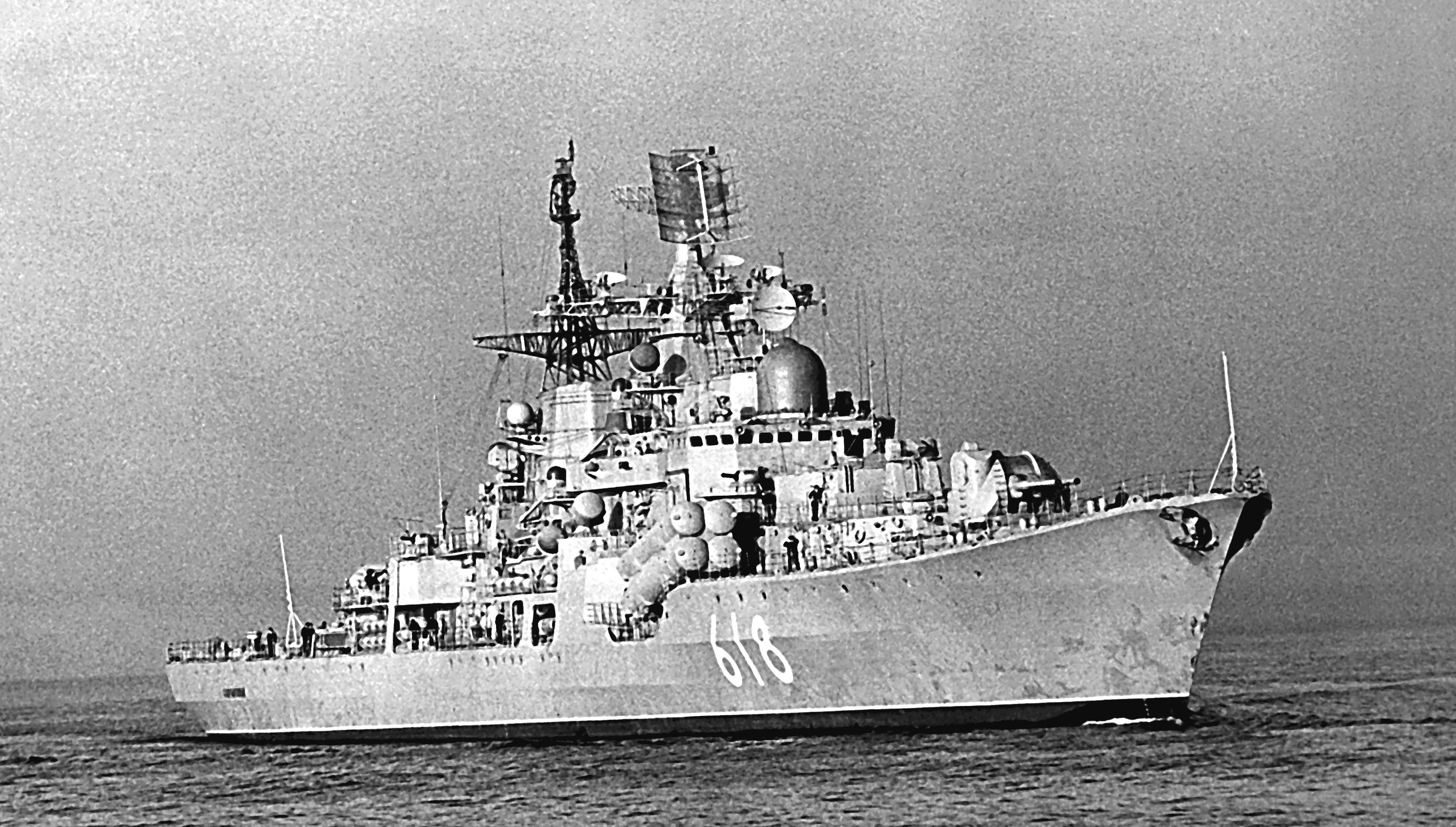
Sovremenny underway in September 1982.

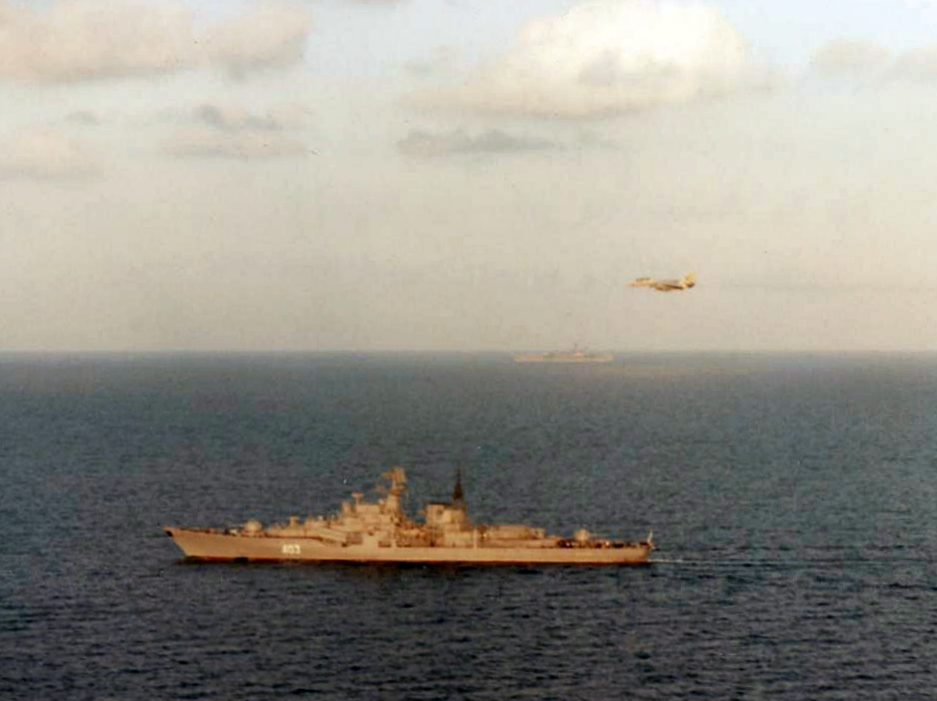
Sovremenny with a Tomcat F-14A on 15 April 1986.

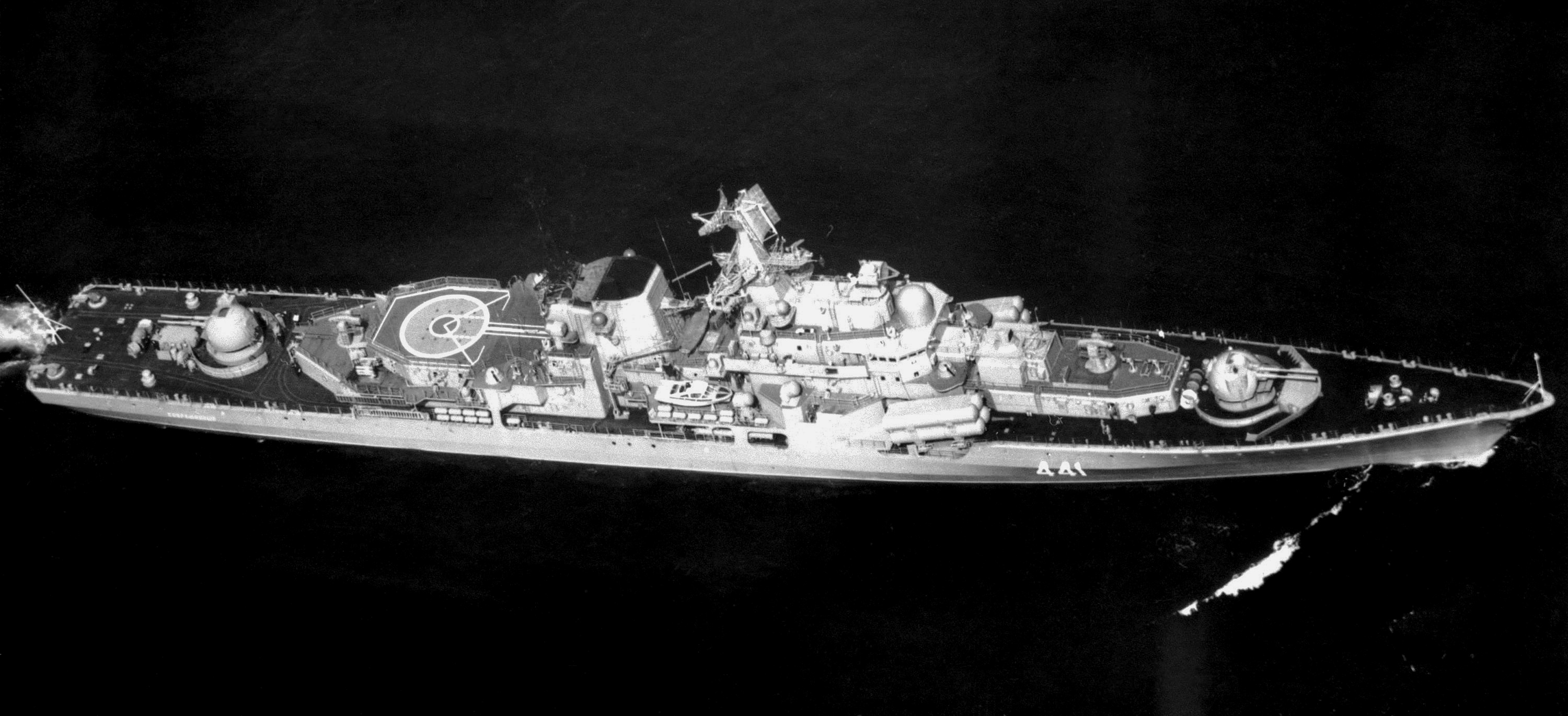
Sovremenny underway in 1986.
