= Sarancha-class missile boat =

Class of Soviet hydrofoil missile boats

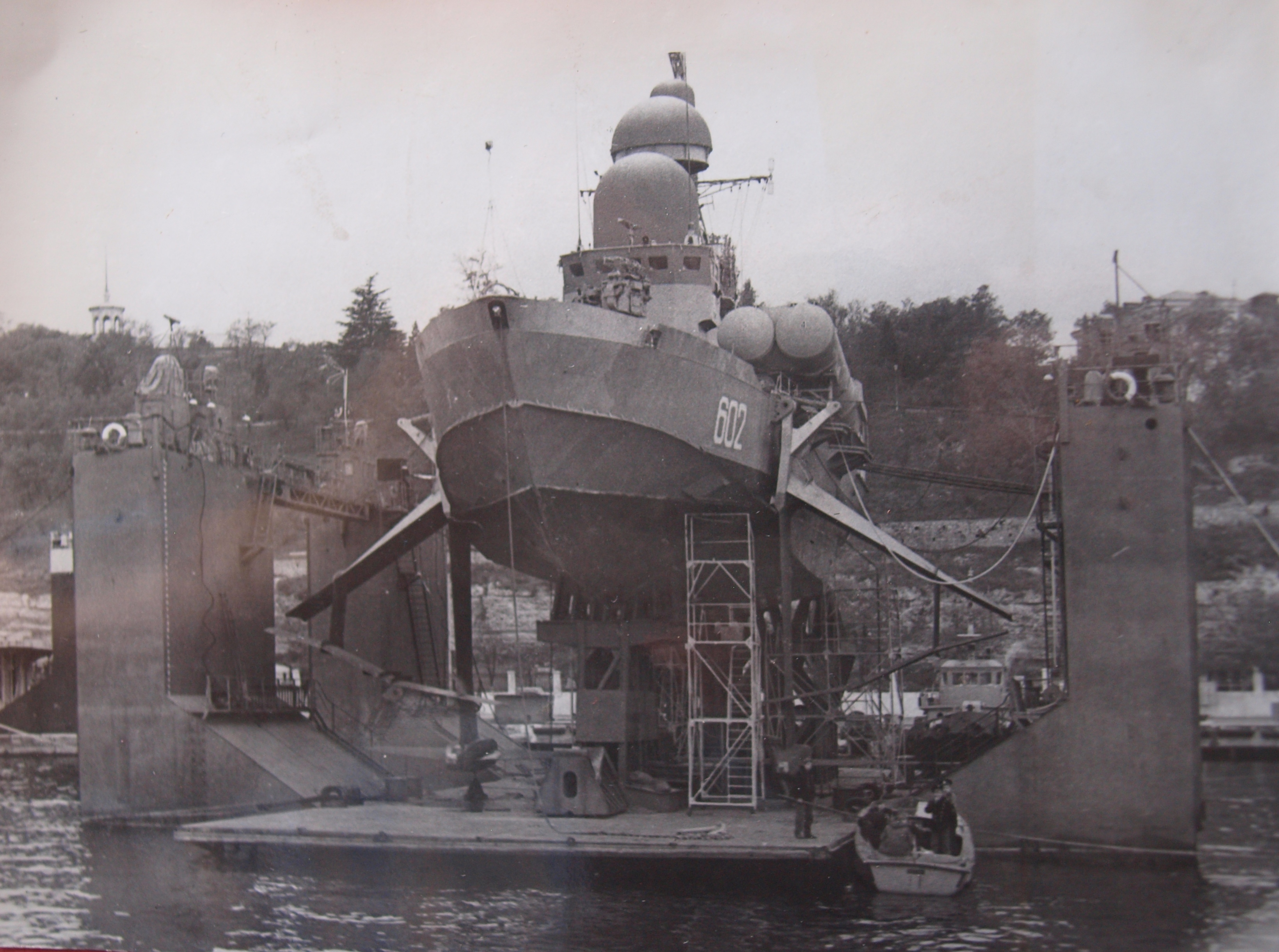
- MRK-5 in a dock in late 1980s.

Class overview
- Builders: Almaz, Leningrad, Soviet Union
- Operators: Soviet Navy
- Built: 1973
- In commission: 1977–1990
- Completed: 1
- Lost: 1

General characteristics
- Type: hydrofoil missile boat
- Displacement: 280 tons standard, 320 tons full load
- Length: 53.6 m
- Beam: 31.31 m
- Draught: 2.6 M (7.3 m with foils extended)
- Propulsion: 4 shafts, 2 gas turbines 30,000 hp (diesel - GT) 2 GTD M-10 (based on NK-12) 2 diesel M-401 (DRA-211) little cruise 3 gas turbogenerators GTG-100 2 diesel generators DG-100
- Speed: 58 kn (107 km/h)
- Range: 700 nmi (1,300 km)
- Complement: 40
- Sensors & processing systems: Radar: Band Stand, Pop Group, Bass Tilt
- Armament: 4 x SS-N-9 anti ship missiles 1 SA-N-4 SAM system (20 re-load missiles); 1- 30mm AK-630 gun system

The Sarancha class is the NATO reporting name for a hydrofoil missile boat built for the Soviet Navy. The Soviet designation was Project 1240 Uragan (Russian: Серия 1240 Ураган, lit. '1240 Hurricane').

== Design ==
The boat was a very complex design. Unlike previous Soviet hydrofoil boats the Project 1240 had fully submerged foils with propellers mounted on the after set of foils. The boat achieved a speed of 58 knots (107 km/h) and had a heavy armament. It was deemed too large, complex and expensive for series production and only a prototype boat was built.

== Missile boat MRK-5 ==
The MRK-5 (МРК-5) was laid down at the Petrovski plant in Leningrad in 1973 and was on trials until 1977. In 1979, she was transferred to the Black Sea Fleet via Russian inland waterways. She was based in Sevastopol until 1990, when she was decommissioned. In 1992, she was damaged by fire and sunk in shallow water. The wreck was raised and scrapped.

== See also ==
- List of ships of the Soviet Navy
- List of ships of Russia by project number
- HMCS Bras d'Or (FHE 400), a Canadian hydrofoil intended for anti-submarine duties
- HMS Speedy (P296), a Royal Navy Jetfoil mine countermeasure vessel.
- Pegasus-class hydrofoil, a class of USN PHM
- Matka-class missile boat, a class of Soviet PHM
- Sparviero-class patrol boat, a class of Italian PHM
