= Soviet frigate Rezvyy =

Krivak-class frigate

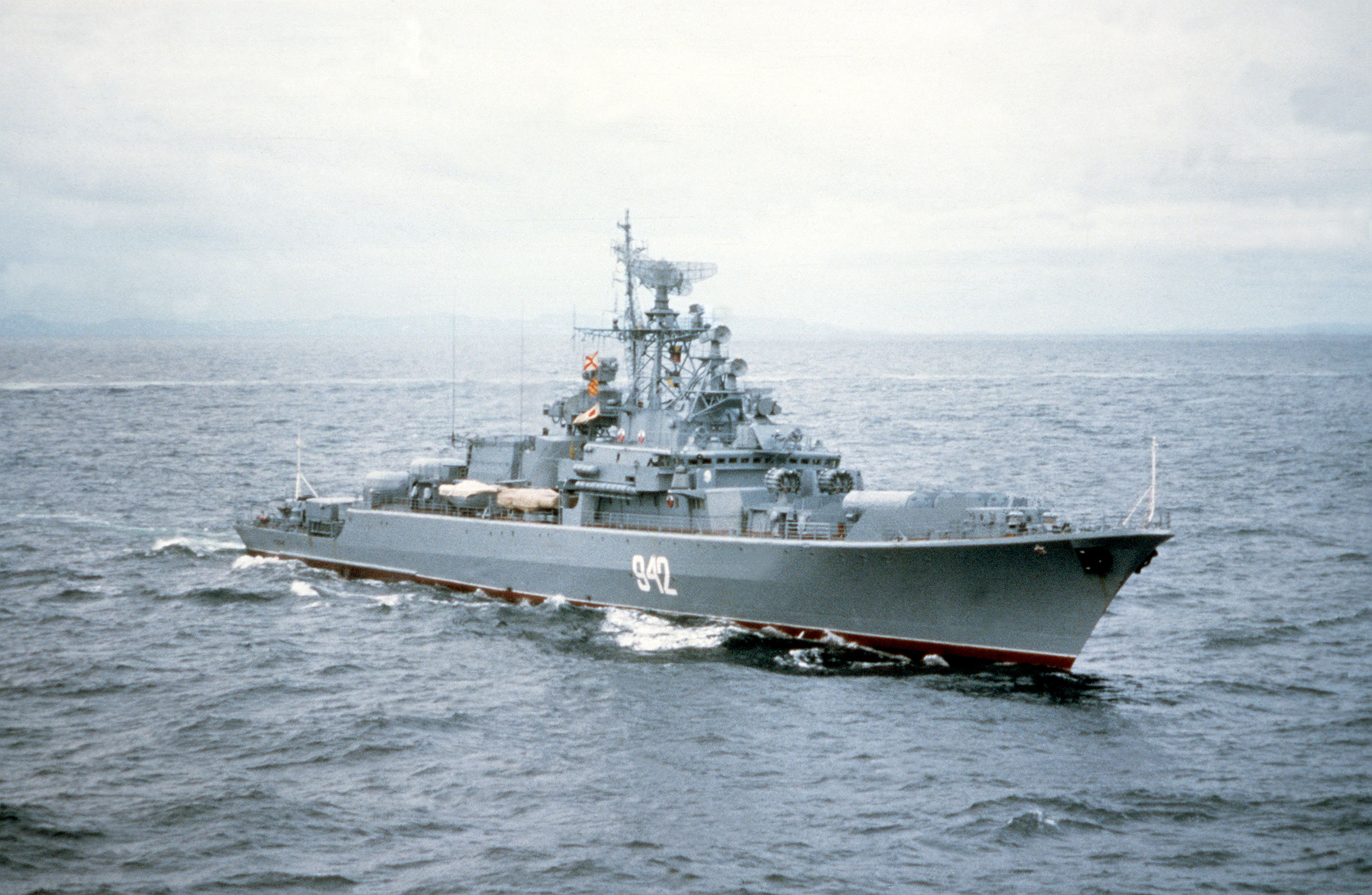
- Rezvyy underway on 26 October 1983.

History

Soviet Union → Russia
- Name: Rezvyy
- Namesake: Russian for Frisky
- Builder: Yantar shipyard, Kaliningrad
- Yard number: 159
- Laid down: 10 December 1973
- Launched: 30 May 1975
- Commissioned: 30 December 1975
- Decommissioned: 1 June 2001
- Fate: Broken up

General characteristics
- Class & type: Project 1135M Burevestnik frigate
- Displacement: 2,935 t (2,889 long tons; 3,235 short tons) (standard); 3,305 t (3,253 long tons; 3,643 short tons) (full load)
- Length: 123 m (403 ft 7 in)
- Beam: 14.2 m (46 ft 7 in)
- Draft: 4.5 m (14 ft 9 in)
- Installed power: 44,000 shp (33,000 kW)
- Propulsion: 4 gas turbines; COGAG; 2 shafts
- Speed: 32 kn (59 km/h)
- Range: 3,900 nmi (7,223 km) at 14 kn (26 km/h)
- Complement: 23 officers, 171 ratings
- Sensors & processing systems: MR-310A Angara-A air/surface search radar; Don navigational radar; MR-143 Lev-214 fire control radar; MG-332T Titan-2T, MG-325 Vega, 2 MG-7 Braslet and MGS-400K sonars
- Electronic warfare & decoys: PK-16 decoy-dispenser system
- Armament: 4 × URPK-5 Rastrub (SS-N-14 'Silex') anti-submarine and anti-shipping missiles (1×4); 4 × ZIF-122 4K33 launchers (2×2) with 40 4K33 OSA-M (SA-N-4 'Gecko') surface to air missiles (2×2); 2 × 100 mm (4 in) AK-100 guns (2×1); 2 × RBU-6000 Smerch-2 anti-submarine rockets; 8 × 533 mm (21 in) torpedo tubes (2×4)

Rezvyy or Rezvy (Russian: Резвый, "Frisky") was the lead Project 1135M Burevestnik-class (Russian: Буревестник, "Petrel") Guard Ship (Сторожевой Корабль, SKR) or 'Krivak II'-class frigate. Launched on 30 May 1975, the vessel was designed to operate in an anti-submarine role in the Soviet Navy, with armament built around the Metel Anti-Ship Complex. Part of the Northern Fleet, the vessel undertook operations in the Atlantic Ocean, including visits to Congo and Cuba, and participating in the Atlantic-84 major naval exercise in 1984. After a major refit between 1989 and 1992, Rezvyy was recommissioned into the Russian Navy. The ship continued to travel, visiting Norway in 1993. After more than twenty-five years service, Rezvyy was decommissioned on 1 June 2001 and subsequently broken up.

== Design and development ==
Rezvyy was the first of eleven Project 1135M ships launched between 1975 and 1981. Project 1135, the Burevestnik (Russian: Буревестник, "Petrel") class, was envisaged by the Soviet Navy as a less expensive complement to the Project 1134A Berkut A (NATO reporting name 'Kresta II') and Project 1134B Berkut B (NATO reporting name 'Kara') classes of anti-submarine ships called Large Anti-Submarine Ships (Большой Противолодочный Корабль, BPK) by the Soviets. The design, by N. P. Sobolov, combined a powerful missile armament with good seakeeping for a blue water role.

Project 1135M was an improvement on the basic Project 1135 developed in 1972 with slightly increased displacement and heavier guns. They also mounted the dual-role URPK-5 Rastrub which provided secondary anti-ship capability. The ships initially retained the same BPK designation as the larger vessels but were designated Guard Ship (Сторожевой Корабль, SKR) from 28 July 1977 to reflect their substantial greater anti-ship capability than the earlier members of the class and the Soviet strategy of creating protected areas for friendly submarines close to the coast. NATO forces called the vessels 'Krivak II'-class frigates. The class was also sometimes known as the Rezvyy-class after this vessel.

Displacing 2,935 tonnes (2,889 long tons; 3,235 short tons) standard and 3,305 t (3,253 long tons; 3,643 short tons) full load, Rezvyy was 123 m (403 ft 7 in) long overall, with a beam of 14.2 m (46 ft 7 in) and a draught of 4.5 m (14 ft 9 in). Power was provided by two 22,000 shp (16,000 kW) M7K power sets, each consisting of a combination of a 17,000-shaft-horsepower (13,000 kW) DK59 and a 5,000 shp (3,700 kW) M62 gas turbine arranged in a COGAG installation and driving one fixed-pitch propeller. Design speed was 32 knots (59 km/h; 37 mph) and range 3,900 nautical miles (7,223 km; 4,488 mi) at 14 kn (26 km/h; 16 mph). The ship's complement was 194, including 23 officers.

=== Armament and sensors ===
Rezvyy was designed for anti-submarine warfare around four URPK-5 Rastrub missiles (NATO reporting name SS-N-14 'Silex'), backed up by a pair of quadruple launchers for 533 mm (21 in) torpedoes and a pair of RBU-6000 213 mm (8 in) Smerch-2 anti-submarine rocket launchers. Both the URPK-5 and the torpedoes also had anti-ship capabilities. Defence against aircraft was provided by forty 4K33 OSA-M (SA-N-4 'Gecko') surface to air missiles which were launched from two sets of twin-arm ZIF-122 launchers. Two 100 mm (4 in) AK-100 guns were mounted aft in a superfiring arrangement.

The ship had a well-equipped sensor suite, including a single MR-310A Angara-A air/surface search radar, Don navigation radar, the MP-401S Start-S ESM radar system and the Spectrum-F laser warning system. Fire control for the guns was provided by a MR-143 Lev-214 radar. An extensive sonar complex was fitted, including the bow-mounted MG-332T Titan-2T and the towed-array MG-325 Vega that had a range of up to 15 kilometres (9.3 mi). The vessel was also equipped with the PK-16 decoy-dispenser system which used chaff as a form of missile defense.

== Construction and career ==
Laid down on 10 December 1973 with the yard number 159 at the Yantar Shipyard in Kaliningrad, Rezvyy was launched on 20 May 1975. The vessel, named for a Russian word that can be translated as frisky, was commissioned on 30 December and joined the Northern Fleet.

Rezvyy, along with many other ships of the class, undertook a number of visits to friendly nations. For example, between 7 and 11 September 1982, the ship spent time in Pointe-Noire, Congo. From 2 to 10 December, Rezvyy could be found at the port of Havana, Cuba. The crew would often spend these visits involved in cultural interchanges with the local population. In Cuba, they also hosted a celebration in honour of the foundation of the Soviet Union as well as undertaking joint exercises in the Caribbean Sea.

The vessel returned to Havana at the end of December 1984. On this trip, Rezvyy, along with the Project 1134A cruiser Admiral Isakov, sailed within 30 miles (48 km) of the Mississippi Delta, the closest that a Soviet Navy vessel had been to the US mainland since they started entering the Caribbean in 1969. The ship also took part in large naval exercises, like Atlantic-84, which ran between 31 March and 8 April 1984 and involved over 29 warships including the Project 1144 Orlan (NATO reporting name 'Kirov'-class) battlecruiser Kirov, in the Atlantic Ocean. One of the aims of the exercise was to demonstrate blue water capabilities of the Soviet Navy.

On 8 December 1989, requiring maintenance after a long period of continuous service, Rezvyy was sent to Shipyard No. 35 in Murmansk to be refitted. The vessel was recommissioned on 6 August 1992. By this time, the dissolution of the Soviet Union had meant that the Soviet Navy ceased to exist. Rezvyy entered service with the Russian Navy. Visits to other ports continued, but the range of nations expanded, For example, between 14 and 18 May 1993, the ship visited Tromsø in Norway, a member country of NATO. On 1 June 2001, Rezvyy was decommissioned, disarmed at Murmansk and subsequently broken up.
