= Soviet destroyer Gnevny (1936) =

Soviet Navy's Gnevny-class destroyer

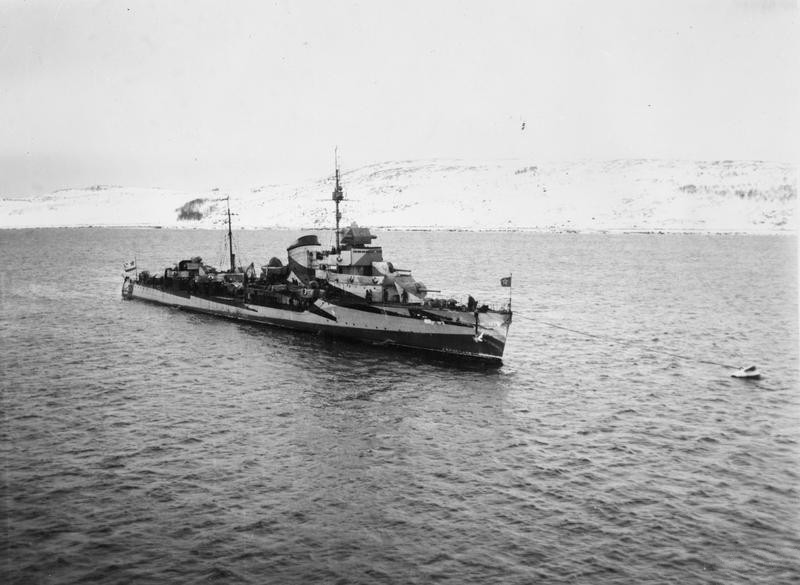
- Aerial view of sister ship Razumny, March 1944

History

Soviet Union
- Name: Gnevny (Гневный (Angry))
- Ordered: 2nd Five-Year Plan
- Builder: Shipyard No. 190 (Zhdanov), Leningrad
- Laid down: 8 December 1935
- Launched: 13 July 1936
- Completed: 23 December 1938
- Fate: Sunk by aircraft, 26 June 1941

General characteristics (Gnevny as completed, 1938)
- Class & type: Gnevny-class destroyer
- Displacement: 1,612 t (1,587 long tons) (standard)
- Length: 112.8 m (370 ft 1 in) (o/a)
- Beam: 10.2 m (33 ft 6 in)
- Draft: 4.8 m (15 ft 9 in)
- Installed power: 3 water-tube boilers; 48,000 shp (36,000 kW)
- Propulsion: 2 shafts; 2 geared steam turbines
- Speed: 38 knots (70 km/h; 44 mph)
- Range: 2,720 nmi (5,040 km; 3,130 mi) at 19 knots (35 km/h; 22 mph)
- Complement: 197 (236 wartime)
- Sensors & processing systems: Mars hydrophone
- Armament: 4 × single 130 mm (5.1 in) guns; 2 × single 76.2 mm (3 in) AA guns; 2 × single 45 mm (1.8 in) AA guns; 2 × single 12.7 mm (0.50 in) AA machineguns; 2 × triple 533 mm (21 in) torpedo tubes; 60–96 mines; 2 × depth charge racks, 25 depth charges

Gnevny (Russian: Гневный, lit. 'Angry') was the lead ship of her class (officially known as Project 7) of 29 destroyers built for the Soviet Navy during the late 1930s. Completed in 1938, she was assigned to the Baltic Fleet and played a minor role in the 1939–1940 Winter War when the Soviet Union invaded Finland. A few days after the start of the German invasion of the Soviet Union (Operation Barbarossa) in June 1941, the ship struck a German mine and was badly damaged. After taking off the survivors, the Soviets failed to sink Gnevny with gunfire before they withdrew and the abandoned wreck drifted until she was sunk by German bombers three days later.

== Design and description ==
Having decided to build the large and expensive 40-knot (74 km/h; 46 mph) Leningrad-class destroyer leaders, the Soviet Navy sought Italian assistance in designing smaller and cheaper destroyers. They licensed the plans for the Folgore class and, in modifying it for their purposes, made a marginally stable design top heavy.

The Gnevnys had an overall length of 112.8 meters (370 ft 1 in), a beam of 10.2 meters (33 ft 6 in), and a draft of 4.8 meters (15 ft 9 in) at deep load. The ships were significantly overweight, almost 200 metric tons (197 long tons) heavier than designed, displacing 1,612 metric tons (1,587 long tons) at standard load and 2,039 metric tons (2,007 long tons) at deep load. Their crew numbered 197 officers and sailors in peacetime and 236 in wartime. The ships had a pair of geared steam turbines, each driving one propeller, rated to produce 48,000 shaft horsepower (36,000 kW) using steam from three water-tube boilers which was intended to give them a maximum speed of 37 knots (69 km/h; 43 mph). The designers had been conservative in rating the turbines and many, but not all, of the ships handily exceeded their designed speed during their sea trials. Others fell considerably short of it. Gnevny reached 39.4 knots (73.0 km/h; 45.3 mph) from 53,000 shp (40,000 kW) during her trials. Variations in fuel oil capacity meant that the range of the Gnevnys varied between 1,670 to 3,145 nautical miles (3,093 to 5,825 km; 1,922 to 3,619 mi) at 19 knots (35 km/h; 22 mph). Gnevny herself demonstrated a range of 2,720 nmi (5,040 km; 3,130 mi) at that speed.

As built, the Gnevny-class ships mounted four 130-millimeter (5.1 in) B-13 guns in two pairs of superfiring single mounts fore and aft of the superstructure. Anti-aircraft defense was provided by a pair of 76.2-millimeter (3 in) 34-K AA guns in single mounts and a pair of 45-millimeter (1.8 in) 21-K AA guns as well as two 12.7-millimeter (0.50 in) DK or DShK machine guns. They carried six 533 mm (21.0 in) torpedo tubes in two rotating triple mounts amidships; each tube was provided with a reload. The ships could also carry a maximum of either 60 or 95 mines and 25 depth charges. They were fitted with a set of Mars hydrophones for anti-submarine work, although they were useless at speeds over 3 knots (5.6 km/h; 3.5 mph). The ships were equipped with two K-1 paravanes intended to destroy mines and a pair of depth-charge throwers.

== Construction and service ==
Built in Leningrad's Shipyard No. 190 (Zhdanov) with the yard number 501, Gnevny was laid down on 8 December 1935, launched on 13 July 1936, and entered service with the Baltic Fleet on 23 December 1938. She bombarded Finnish fortifications on Utö in Åland on 14 December 1939 during the Winter War. On 23 June 1941, a day after Operation Barbarossa began, Gnevny was tasked with covering minelaying operations at the mouth of the Gulf of Finland along with the rest of the 1st Division of the Baltic Fleet's Light Forces Detachment – the light cruiser Maxim Gorky and her sisters Gordy and Steregushchy. She ran into a German minefield 16 to 18 nautical miles (30 to 33 km; 18 to 21 mi) northwest of Tahkuna Lighthouse and had her bow blown off by a mine, killing 20 men and wounding 23 others. Her crew, ordered to abandon ship after the commander of the force received a report of periscopes, was taken aboard Gordy. The accompanying ships unsuccessfully attempted to sink Gnevny with gunfire. Two days later, the abandoned hulk was spotted by three German Junkers Ju 88 bombers, who bombed and sank her. The destroyer was removed from the Navy List on 27 July.

== Sources ==
- Balakin, Sergey (2007). Легендарные "семёрки" Эсминцы "сталинской" серии [Legendary Sevens: Stalin's Destroyer Series] (in Russian). Moscow: Yauza/Eksmo. ISBN 978-5-699-23784-5.
- Berezhnoy, Sergey (2002). Крейсера и миноносцы. Справочник [Guide to Cruisers and Destroyers] (in Russian). Moscow: Voenizdat. ISBN 978-5-203-01780-2.
- Budzbon, Przemysaw (1980). "Soviet Union". In Chesneau, Roger (ed.). Conway's All the World's Fighting Ships 1922–1946. Greenwich, UK: Conway Maritime Press. pp. 318–346. ISBN 978-0-85177-146-5.
- Hill, Alexander (2018). Soviet Destroyers of World War II. New Vanguard. Vol. 256. Oxford, UK: Osprey Publishing. ISBN 978-1-4728-2256-7.
- Yakubov, Vladimir & Worth, Richard (2008). "The Soviet Project 7/7U Destroyers". In Jordan, John & Dent, Stephen (eds.). Warship 2008. London: Conway. pp. 99–114. ISBN 978-1-84486-062-3.
