= Russian destroyer Okrylyonny =

Sovremenny-class destroyer of the Soviet & Russian Navy

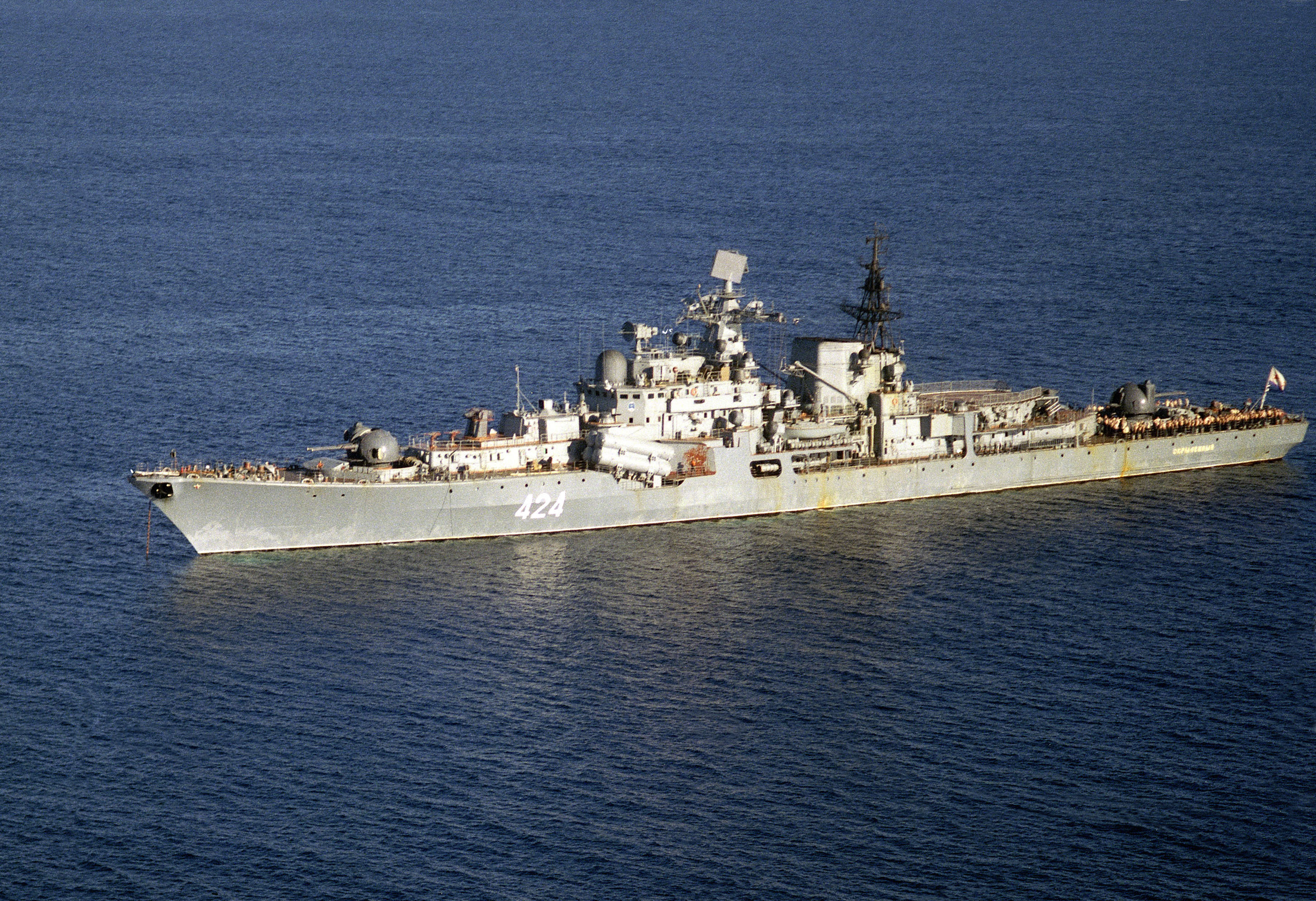
- Okrylyonny on 22 December 1986

History

Soviet Union → Russia
- Name: Okrylyonny; (Окрылённый)
- Namesake: Winged in Russian
- Builder: Zhdanov Shipyard, Leningrad
- Laid down: 16 April 1983
- Launched: 31 May 1986
- Commissioned: 26 March 1988
- Decommissioned: 29 November 1998
- Home port: Kaliningrad
- Identification: Pennant number: 415, 424, 444, 670
- Fate: Scrapped

General characteristics
- Class & type: Sovremenny-class destroyer
- Displacement: 6,600 tons standard, 8,480 tons full load
- Length: 156 m (511 ft 10 in)
- Beam: 17.3 m (56 ft 9 in)
- Draught: 6.5 m (21 ft 4 in)
- Propulsion: 2 shaft steam turbines, 4 boilers, 75,000 kW (100,000 hp), 2 fixed propellers, 2 turbo generators, and 2 diesel generators
- Speed: 32.7 knots (60.6 km/h; 37.6 mph)
- Range: 3,920 nmi (7,260 km; 4,510 mi) at 18 knots (33 km/h; 21 mph); 1,345 nmi (2,491 km; 1,548 mi) at 33 knots (61 km/h; 38 mph)
- Complement: 350
- Sensors & processing systems: Radar: Air target acquisition radar, 3 × navigation radars, 130 mm gun fire-control radars, 30 mm air-defence gun fire control radar; Sonar: Active and passive under-keel sonar; ES: Tactical situation plotting board, anti-ship missile fire control system, air defence, missile fire-control system, and torpedo fire control system
- Electronic warfare & decoys: 2 PK-2 decoy dispensers (200 rockets)
- Armament: Guns: 2 × twin AK-130 130 mm (5 in) naval guns; 4 × 30 mm (1.2 in) AK-630 CIWS; Missiles; 2 × quad (SS-N-22 'Sunburn') anti-ship missiles; 2 × 24 SA-N-7 'Gadfly' surface-to-air missiles; Anti-submarine: 2 × twin 533 mm (21 in) torpedo tubes; 2 × 6 RBU-1000 300 mm (12 in) anti-submarine rocket launchers
- Aircraft carried: 1× Ka-27 helicopter
- Aviation facilities: Helipad

Okrylyonny was a Sovremenny-class destroyer of the Soviet and later Russian navy.

== Development and design ==
The project began in the late 1960s when it was becoming obvious in the Soviet Navy that naval guns still had an important role particularly in support of amphibious landings, but existing gun cruisers and destroyers were showing their age. A new design was started, employing a new 130-millimetre (5 in) automatic gun turret.

The Sovremenny-class ships were 156 metres (512 ft) in length, with a beam of 17.3 metres (56 ft 9 in) and a draught of 6.5 metres (21 ft 4 in).

== Construction and career ==
Okrylyonny was laid down on 16 April 1983 and launched on 31 May 1986 by Zhdanov Shipyard in Leningrad. She was commissioned on 26 March 1988.

From 4 to 17 March 1989, the ship as part of the IBM carried out direct monitoring of the NATO exercises Nord Star, which took place in the Norwegian Sea, followed the actions of the aircraft carrier HMS Ark Royal and the landing ship HMS Intrepid. On December 1, 1989, she again went to sea.

On January 4, 1990, she carried out combat service in the Mediterranean Sea. In the period from March 14 to March 31, she made a business call to Tartus, and from April 14 to April 21 she followed the American AUG as part of a fleet including the USS Dwight D. Eisenhower and USS Ticonderoga. She returned from combat service to Severomorsk on June 13, 1990. During the combat service she covered 21,702 nautical miles. She received a combat service rating of excellent. In the same year, the ship received the Prize of the Main Committee of the Navy for artillery shooting and also received the Challenging Banner.

She entered the new military service in the North Atlantic on January 4, 1991, accompanied by Kalinin on the transition to the Mediterranean Sea. Having reached Gibraltar, she laid down on a return course and returned to Severomorsk on January 23, having covered 6,053 nautical miles. She went to sea again on August 15, 1991, to pay a visit to Plymouth in Great Britain, but on August 19 he returned in connection with the Emergency Committee, having covered 3,047 nautical miles for the cruise.

She participated in the testing of launches of modernized Moskit missiles. In 1992 and 1993, she took part in exercises and combat training.

On January 6, 1994, the ship was docked at the shipyard No. 82 in Roslyakovo, on March 9, it was put into reserve category 2.

In April 1997, the destroyer was visited by the Commander-in-Chief of the Navy F. Gromov. Since the terms of the average repair and the required surveys had expired, the fleet management decided not to restore the ship without preservation.

On November 29, 1998, the ship was excluded from the fleet and withdrawn after converting to Severomorsk.

Since the raising of the flag, the ship has covered 69,483.7 nautical miles. Government awards on the ship were awarded to 40 people, one of them with the order.

== Gallery ==
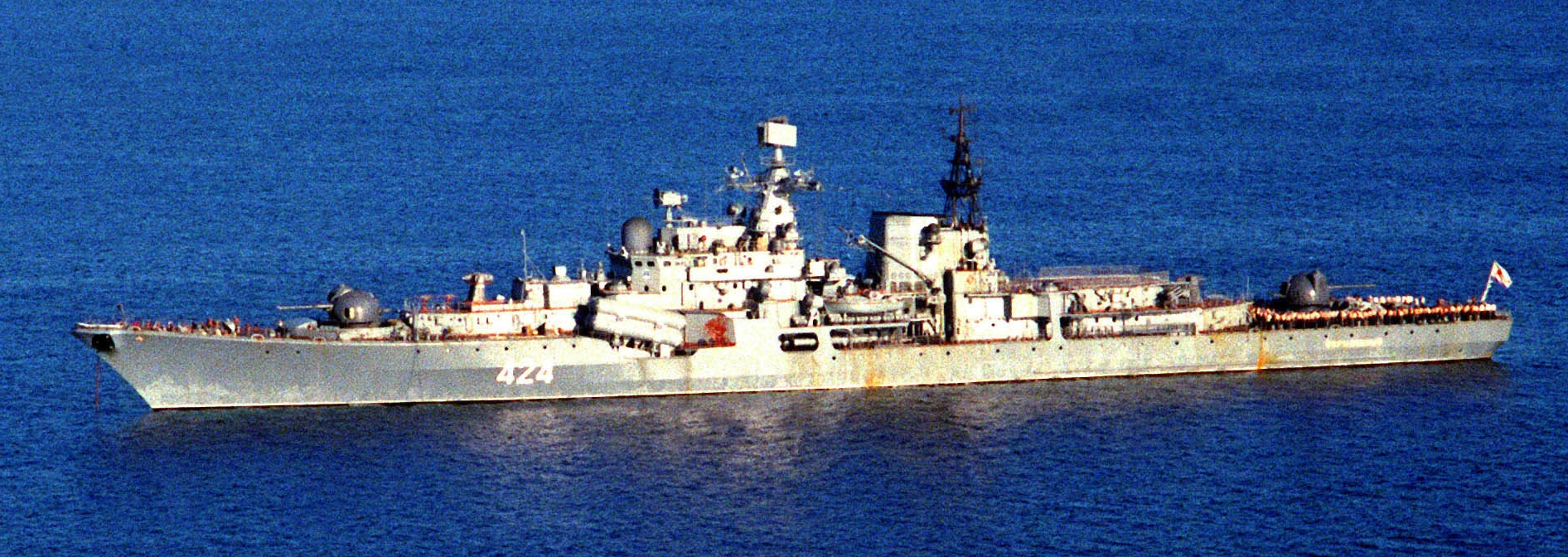
Okrylyonny underway in 1989.

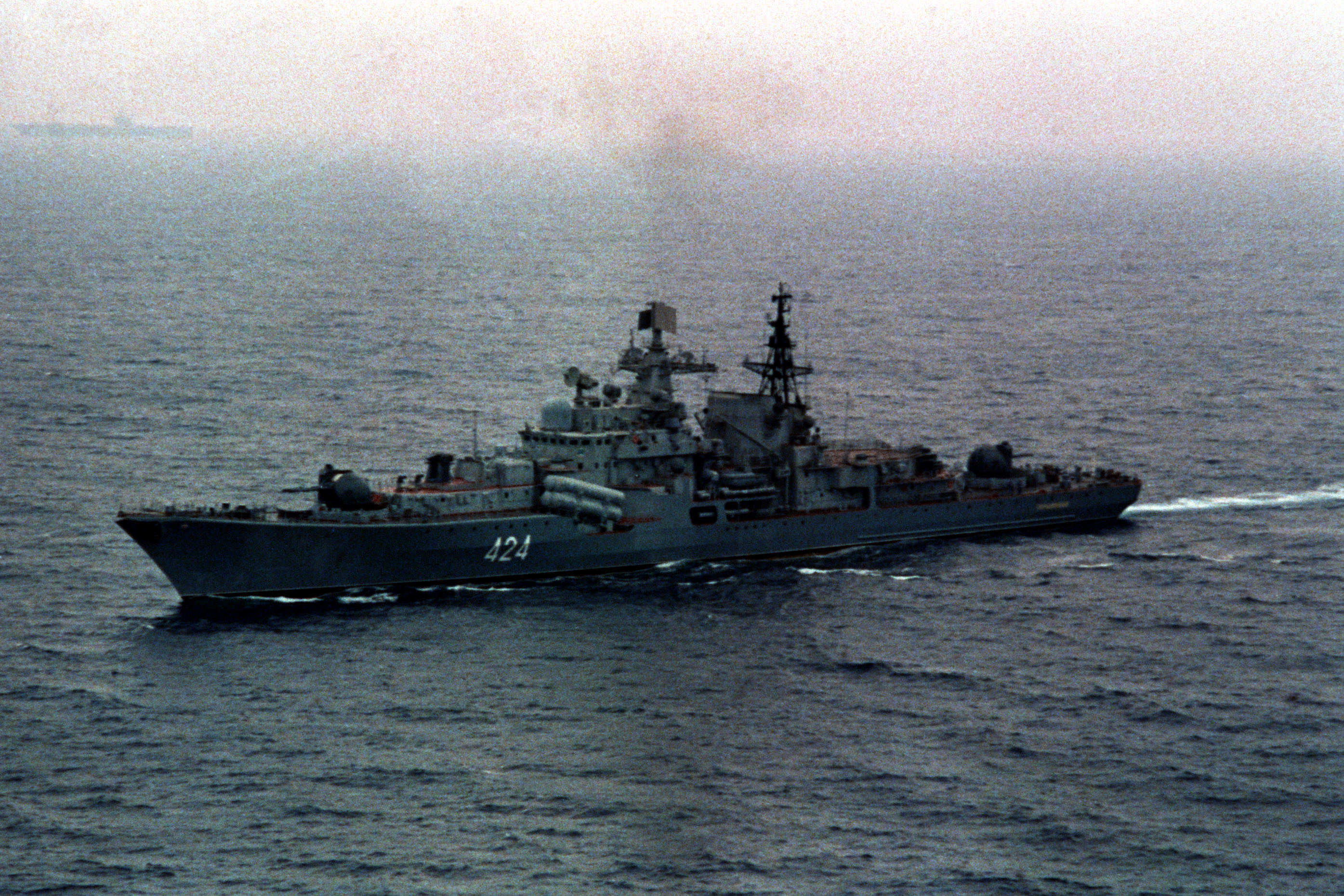
Okrylyonny underway in 1990.
