= Soviet cruiser Marshal Timoshenko =

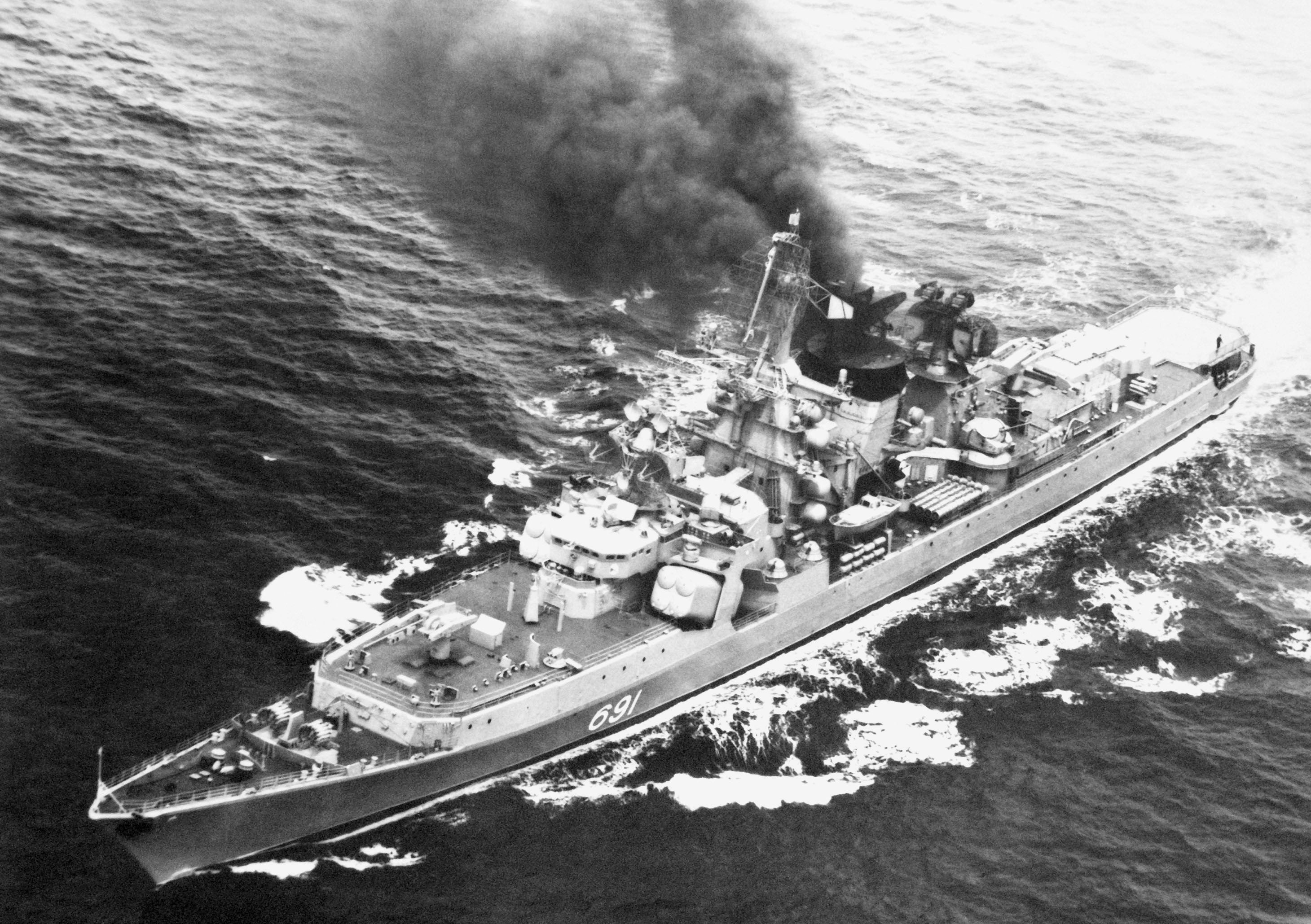
- Marshal Timoshenko underway on 6 March 1986

History

Soviet Union
- Name: Marshal Timoshenko
- Namesake: Semyon Timoshenko
- Builder: Zhdanov Shipyard
- Laid down: 2 November 1972
- Launched: 21 October 1973
- Commissioned: 25 November 1975
- Decommissioned: 3 July 1992
- Fate: Sold for scrap, 1994

General characteristics
- Class & type: Kresta II-class cruiser
- Displacement: 5,600 tons standard; 7,535 tons full load
- Length: 156.5 m (513 ft)
- Beam: 17.2 m (56 ft)
- Draught: 5.96 m (19.6 ft)
- Propulsion: 2 shaft steam turbines; 4 boilers; 91,000–100,000 shp (68,000–75,000 kW)
- Speed: 34 kn (63 km/h; 39 mph)
- Range: 10,500 nmi (19,400 km; 12,100 mi) at 14 kn (26 km/h; 16 mph); 5,200 nmi (9,600 km; 6,000 mi) at 18 kn (33 km/h; 21 mph)
- Endurance: 1830 tons fuel oil
- Complement: 343
- Sensors & processing systems: Radar; Volga; MR-600 Voskhod; MR-310U Angara M; 2 x 4R60 Grom; 2 x MR-103 Bars; 2 x MR-123 Vympel; Sonar; MG-332T Titan-2T
- Armament: 2 quad SS-N-14 Silex anti-submarine missiles; 2 twin SA-N-3 Goblet surface-to-air missile launchers (72 missiles); 2 twin 57 mm/70 AK-725 anti-aircraft guns; 4 30 mm AK-630 CIWS; 2 quintuple 533 mm torpedo tubes
- Aircraft carried: 1 Kamov Ka-25 'Hormone-A'
- Aviation facilities: Helicopter deck and hangar

Marshal Timoshenko (Russian: Маршал Тимошенко) was a Project 1134A Berkut A (NATO reporting name Kresta II) class cruiser of the Soviet Navy. The eighth ship of her class, the vessel served during the Cold War with the Northern Fleet, often operating in the Atlantic Ocean but also travelling to various ports in the Mediterranean and Red Seas. The cruiser was taken out of service to be modernised in 1988 but a lack of funds meant the work was not completed. Instead Marshal Timoshenko was decommissioned in 1992.

== Design ==
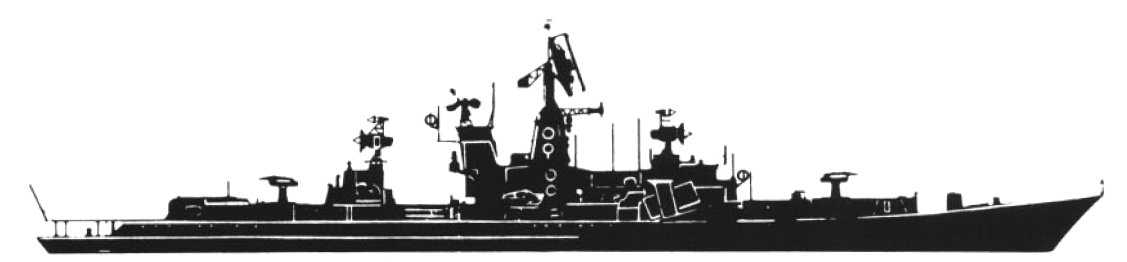
A United States Navy-produced profile drawing of a Kresta II-class cruiser

Marshal Timoshenko was the eighth ship of her class of ten Project 1134A Berkut A (NATO reporting name Kresta II-class) cruisers, designed by Vasily Anikeyev. They were designated as Large Anti-Submarine Ships in accordance with their primary mission of countering NATO submarines.

As a Kresta II-class cruiser, Marshal Timoshenko was 156.5 metres (513.5 ft) long with a beam of 17.2 m (56.4 ft) and a draught of 5.96 m (19.6 ft). She displaced 5,600 tons standard, 6,500 tons light and 7,535 full load, and had a complement of 343. The ship was equipped with a hangar aft to carry a single Kamov Ka-25 Hormone-A helicopter.

Marshal Timoshenko was propelled by two TV-12 steam geared turbines powered by four high pressure boilers which created 75,000 kilowatts (100,577 hp), giving her a maximum speed of 34 knots (63 km/h; 39 mph). She had a range of 5,200 nmi (9,630 km; 5,984 mi) at 18 kn (33 km/h; 21 mph) and 1,754.86 nmi (3,250 km; 2,019 mi) at 32 kn (59 km/h; 37 mph).

=== Armament ===
For her primary role as an anti-submarine cruiser, Marshal Timoshenko mounted two quadruple launchers for eight anti-submarine missiles in the Metel anti-ship complex. She was also equipped with two RBU-6000 12-barrel and two RBU-1000 6-barrel rocket launchers to protect against close-in threats. The Ka-25 helicopter embarked on the cruiser was also capable of aiding in the search and destruction of submarines.

Marshal Timoshenko was armed with four AK-725 57 mm (2 in) L/80 DP guns situated in two twin mountings to protect against aerial threats. The vessel also had four 30 mm (1 in) AK-630 CIWS mountings, and was armed with two twin launchers for the 48 V-611 surface-to-air missiles they carried in the M-11 Shtorm system. She also mounted two quintuple mountings for 533 mm (21 in) dual-role torpedoes.

=== Electronics warfare ===
Marshal Timoshenko was equipped with the MR-600 Voskhod (NATO code name Top Sail) early warning air search radar, the MR-310U Angara-M (NATO code name Head Net C) search radar, and the Volga (NATO code names Don Kay and Don-2) navigational radar. For anti-submarine warfare she had improved MG-332T Titan-2T hull mounted sonar. For fire control purposes she had Grom-M for the surface-to-air missiles, MR-103 Bars for the AK725 and MR-123 Vympel for the AK-630. Marshal Timoshenko also had a MG-26 communications outfit and a MG-35 Shtil sonar.

== Construction ==
Built in the Zhdanov Shipyard with the serial number 728, Marshal Timoshenko, named for Soviet World War II army commander Semyon Timoshenko, was laid down on 2 November 1972 and launched on 21 October 1973.
