= Soviet destroyer Otchayanny =

Sovremenny-class destroyer of the Soviet Navy

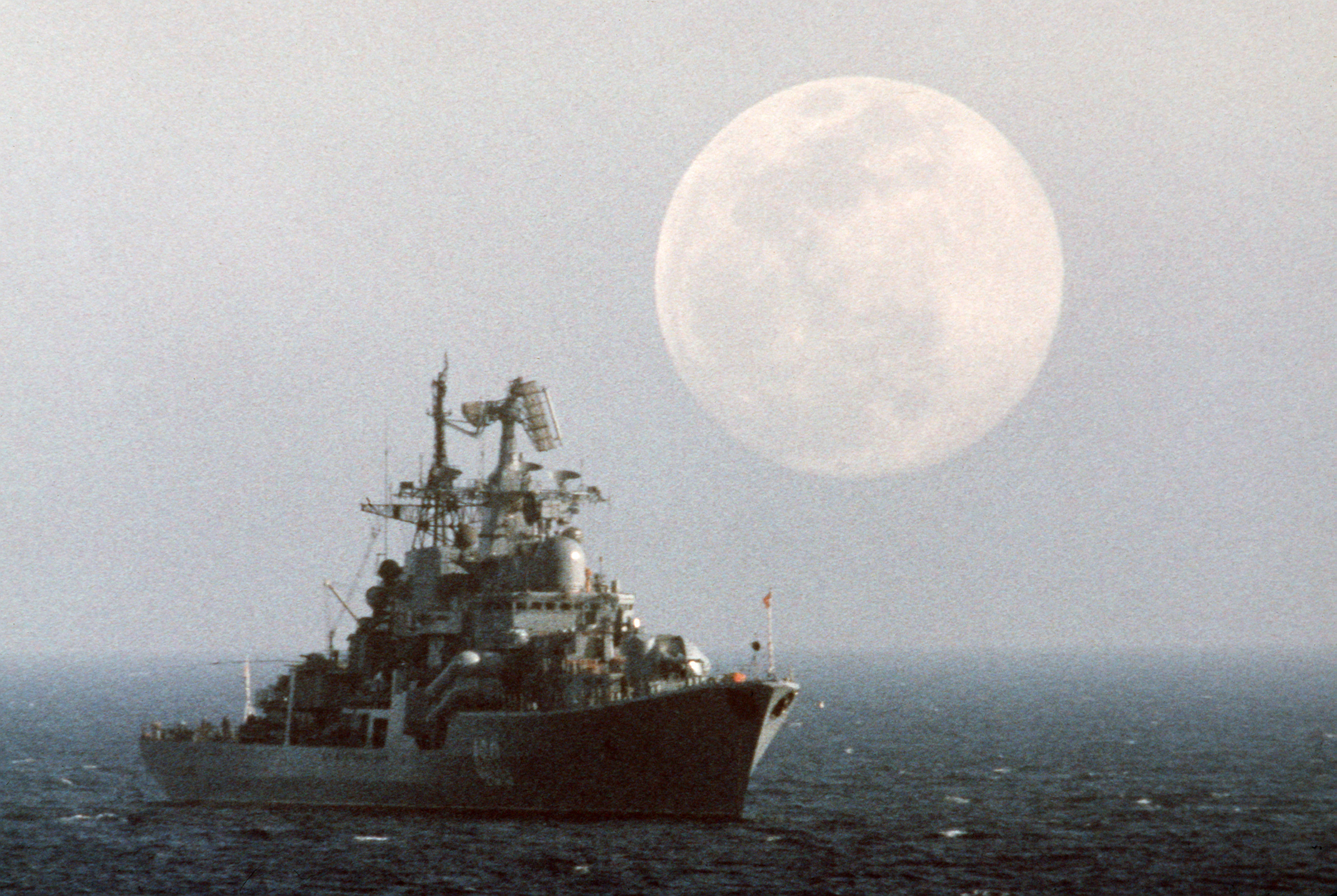
- Otchayanny underway in August 1986

History

Soviet Union → Russia
- Name: Otchayanny; (Отчаянный)
- Namesake: Reckless in Russian
- Builder: Zhdanov Shipyard, Leningrad
- Laid down: 1 March 1977
- Launched: 29 March 1980
- Commissioned: 30 September 1982
- Decommissioned: 12 September 1998
- Home port: Kaliningrad
- Identification: Pennant number: 405, 417, 431, 433, 460, 475, 684
- Fate: Scrapped in Murmansk, 2003

General characteristics
- Class & type: Sovremenny-class destroyer
- Displacement: 6,600 tons standard, 8,480 tons full load
- Length: 156 m (511 ft 10 in)
- Beam: 17.3 m (56 ft 9 in)
- Draught: 6.5 m (21 ft 4 in)
- Propulsion: 2 shaft steam turbines, 4 boilers, 75,000 kW (100,000 hp), 2 fixed propellers, 2 turbo generators, and 2 diesel generators
- Speed: 32.7 knots (60.6 km/h; 37.6 mph)
- Range: 3,920 nmi (7,260 km; 4,510 mi) at 18 knots (33 km/h; 21 mph); 1,345 nmi (2,491 km; 1,548 mi) at 33 knots (61 km/h; 38 mph)
- Complement: 350
- Sensors & processing systems: Radar: Air target acquisition radar, 3 × navigation radars, 130 mm gun fire-control radars, 30 mm air-defence gun fire control radar; Sonar: Active and passive under-keel sonar; ES: Tactical situation plotting board, anti-ship missile fire control system, air defence, missile fire-control system, and torpedo fire control system
- Electronic warfare & decoys: 2 PK-2 decoy dispensers (200 rockets)
- Armament: Guns: 4 (2 × 2) AK-130 130 mm naval guns; 4 × 30 mm AK-630 CIWS; Missiles; 8 (2 × 4) (SS-N-22 'Sunburn') anti-ship missiles; 48 (2 × 24) SA-N-7 'Gadfly' surface-to-air missiles; Anti-submarine: 2 × 2 533 mm torpedo tubes; 2 × 6 RBU-1000 300 mm anti-submarine rocket launchers
- Aircraft carried: 1× Ka-27 series helicopter
- Aviation facilities: Helipad

Otchayanny was a Sovremenny-class destroyer of the Soviet and later Russian navy.

== Development and design ==
The project began in the late 1960s when it was becoming obvious to the Soviet Navy that naval guns still had an important role particularly in support of amphibious landings, but existing gun cruisers and destroyers were showing their age. A new design was started, employing a new 130 mm automatic gun turret.

The ships were 156 metres (512 ft) in length, with a beam of 17.3 metres (56 ft 9 in) and a draught of 6.5 metres (21 ft 4 in).

== Construction and career ==
Otchayanny was laid down on 1 March 1977 and launched on 29 March 1980 by Zhdanov Shipyard in Leningrad. She was commissioned on 30 September 1982.

In October 1991, she was sent to support submarine missile firing and returned to the base in disrepair.

On May 22, 1992, she was put into the reserve of the 2nd category, and a month later (on June 22) was put on medium repair at SRZ-35 (Rosta).

On January 4, 1994, the repair of the ship was discontinued, the ship was included in the 56th Bram and on November 30, 1994, it was towed to Severomorsk.

Since January 30, 1995, she was in the 2nd category reserve, part of the weapons and RTS were removed to repair other ships.

On May 1, 1998, she was transferred to the 43rd division of missile ships of the 7th operative in connection with the reduction of the destroyer brigade. On September 12, 1998, the destroyer was removed from the lists of the Navy, the ship's flag was lowered.

On January 10, 1999, she was docked at SRZ-82 (Roslyakovo) for converting and transfer to ARVI then scrapped in 2003.

== Gallery ==
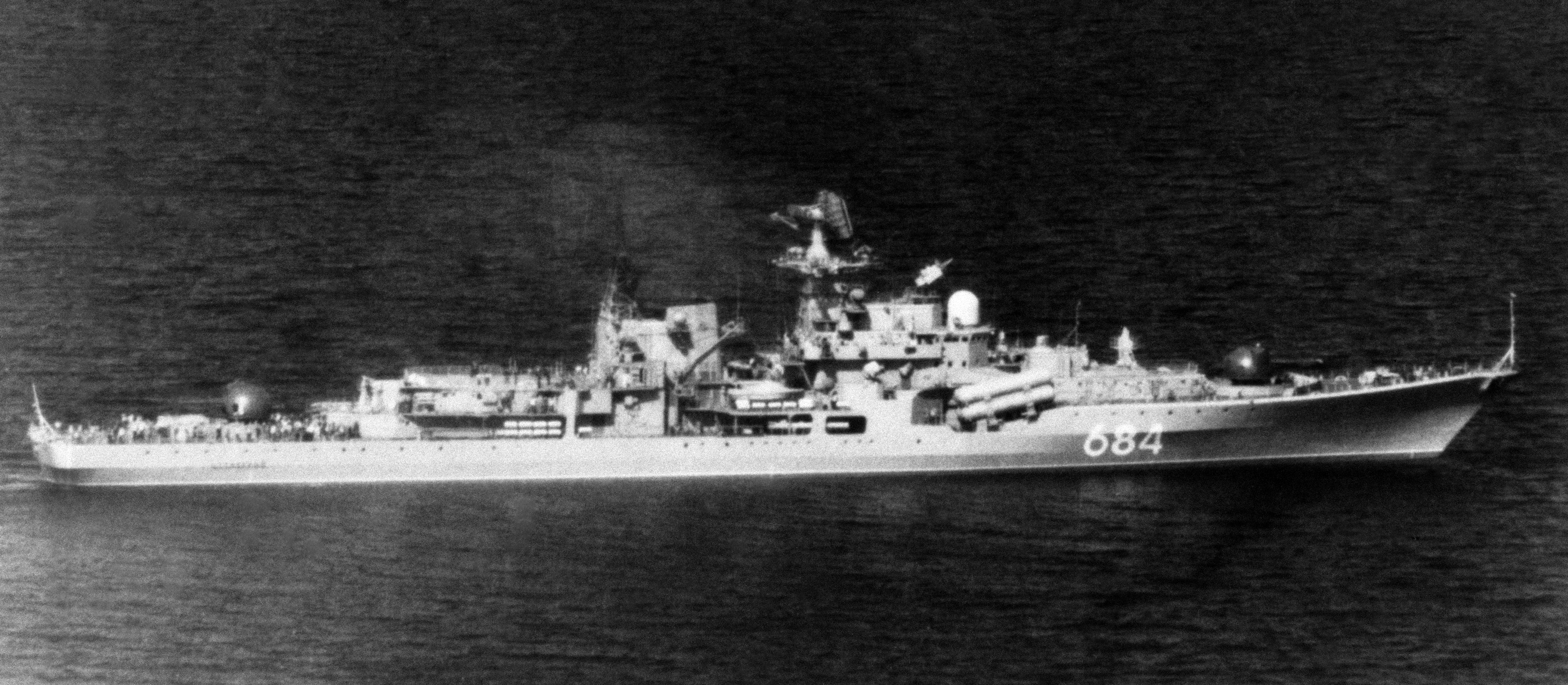
Otchayanny underway on 30 October 1985.

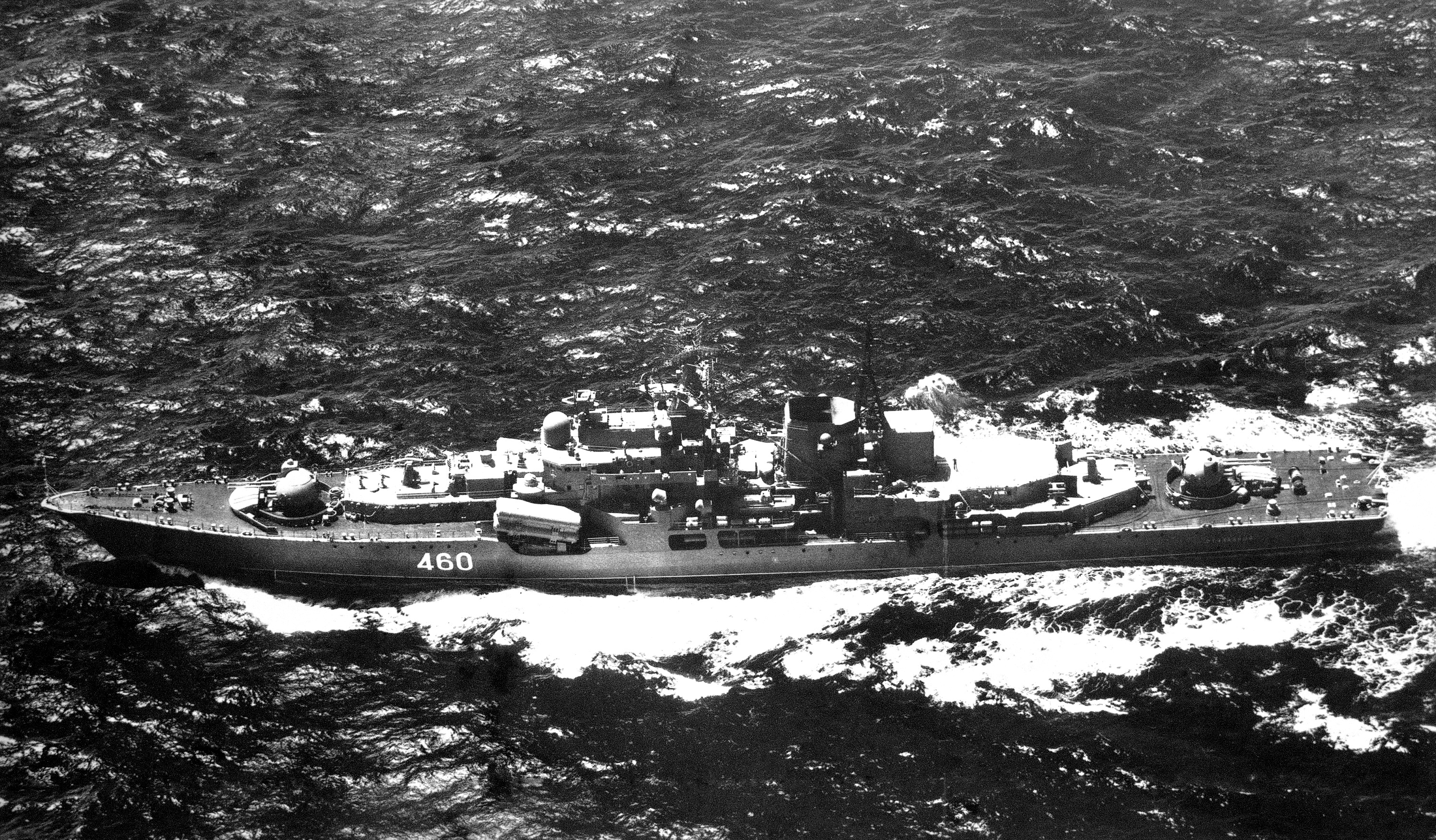
Otchayanny underway on 6 March 1986.

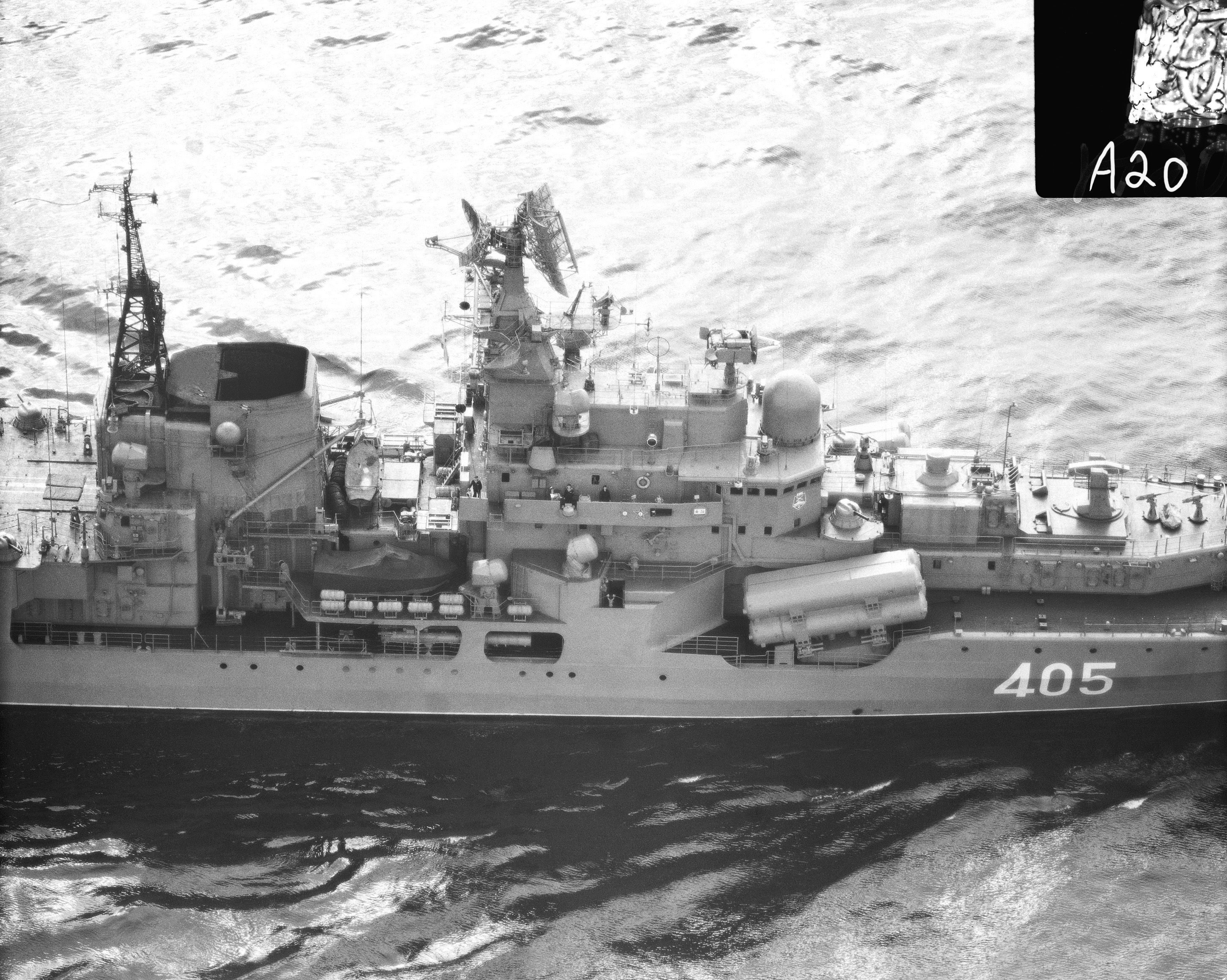
Otchayanny on 1 January 1988.
