= Mod Kashin-class destroyer =

1970s modification of Project 61 anti-submarine destroyers

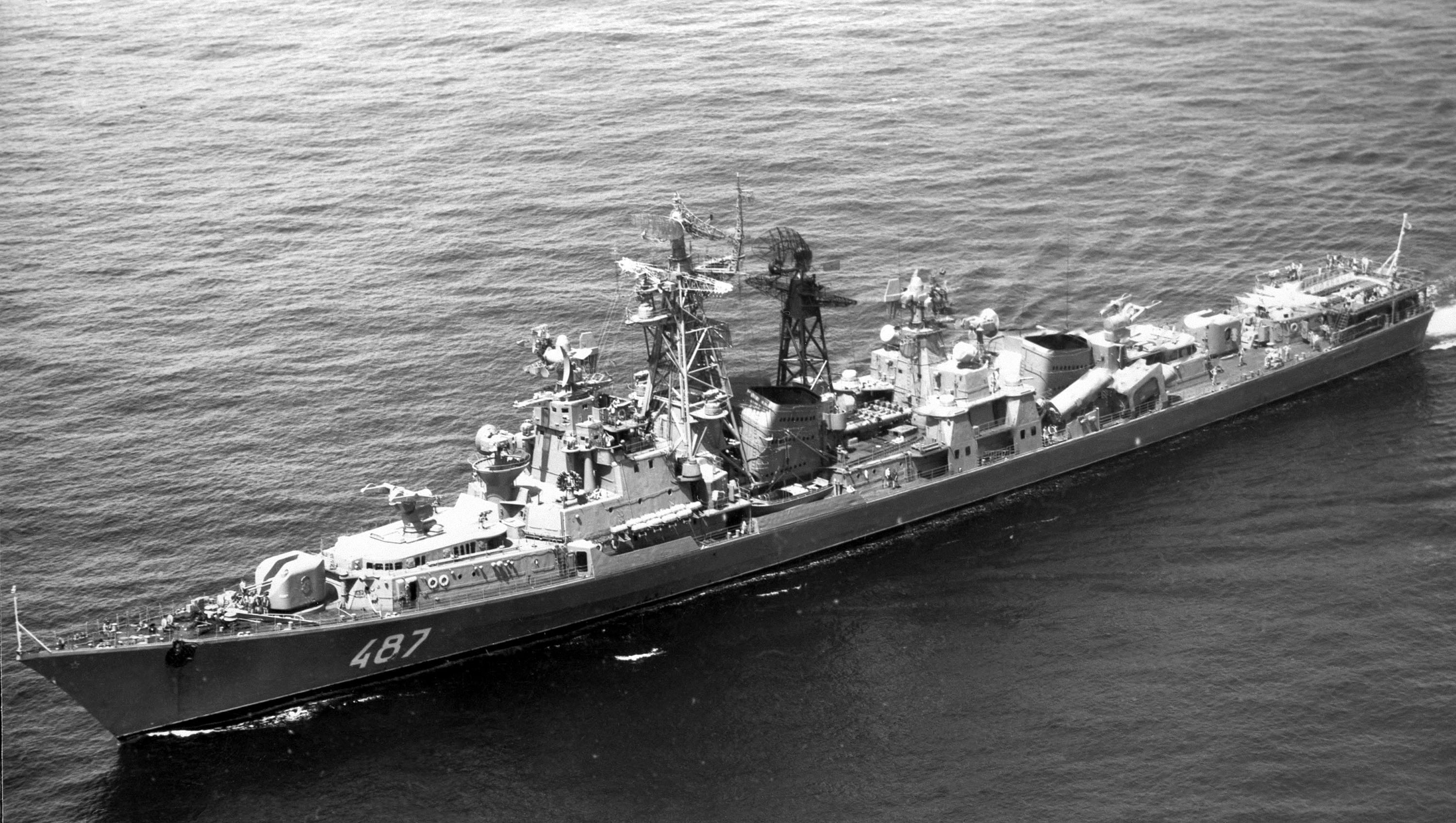
- Soviet destroyer Slavny

Class overview
- Name: Modified Kashin class (Project 61MP)
- Builders: Zhdanov Shipyard; 61 Communards Shipyard
- Operators: Soviet Navy; Russian Navy; Polish Navy; Indian Navy
- Preceded by: Kashin-class destroyer
- Succeeded by: Kara-class cruiser
- Subclasses: Rajput-class destroyer
- Built: 1971–1981
- In commission: 1971–2001
- Completed: 11

General characteristics
- Type: Guided-missile destroyer
- Displacement: 3,950 tons
- Length: 146m (480ft)
- Beam: 15.8m (52ft)
- Draught: 4.8m (16ft)
- Propulsion: 2-shaft COGAG
- Speed: 35 knots
- Complement: 320
- Armament: 2 × 2 AK-726 76.2 mm (3 in) guns; 2 × 2 SA-N-1 'Goa' surface-to-air missile launchers (32 missiles); 1 × 5 533 mm (21 in) torpedo tubes; 2 × 12 RBU-6000 anti-submarine rocket launchers; 4 x 6 AK-630 30mm CIWS; 4 x 1 launchers for SS-N-2 ‘Styx’ anti-ship missiles (project 61M)
- Aircraft carried: room for one Ka-25
- Aviation facilities: one helicopter platform

The Modified Kashin class were six ships built and modified based on the Kashin-class destroyer for the Soviet Navy between 1973 and 1980. Five more ships were built after that for the Indian Navy. The Soviet designation for the Mod Kashin is Project 61MP.

== Added Equipment ==
The main addition to the selected ships were four SS-N-2C anti-ship missile launchers. A pair of AK-630 30mm gatling guns were installed on the sides of the ship, along with a Bass Tilt fire control radar warranting the removal of two RBU-1000 rocket launchers. The landing pad mounted on the stern of the normal Kashin classes were replaced with a helicopter platform. The last change made to the Kashins was an increased forward superstructure on two decks.

== General characteristics ==
- Displacement - Standard: 3,950 tons, full load: 4,950 tons
- Length - 146 m (480 ft), overall
- Beam - 15.8 m (52 ft)
- Draught - 4.8 m (16 ft)
- Propulsions - 2 shaft; COGAG; 4 gas-turbines, 35 knots maximum.
- Complement - 320
- Armament -
  - Surface-to-surface missiles: 4 SS-N-2C launchers; 4 missiles.
  - Anti-air: 2 twin SA-N-1 launchers; 44 missiles, 4 AK-630 30mm gatling guns.
  - Anti-submarine: 2 12-barreled RBU-6000 rocket launchers, five rows of 533mm (21 in) torpedo tubes.

== Ships ==
=== Soviet Navy ===
Ship	Builder	Launched	Commissioned	Modernisation	Fleet	Fate
Ognevoy - Fiery	Zhdanov Shipyard, Leningrad	31 May 1962	31 December 1964	1971	Northern Fleet	Sold to Turkey in 1990 for scrap
Slavny - Glorious	Zhdanov Shipyard, Leningrad	24 April 1965	30 September 1966	1973–1975	Baltic Fleet	Scrapped 19 February 1991
Stroyny - Harmonious	Shipyard named after 61 Communards, Nikolayev	28 July 1965	15 December 1966	1980–1981	Northern Fleet	Sold to India in 1994 for scrap
Smyshlyony - Humorous	Shipyard named after 61 Communards, Nikolayev	22 October 1966	27 September 1968	1975–1977	Northern Fleet	Scrapped in India
Smely - Valiant	Shipyard named after 61 Communards, Nikolayev	2 June 1968	27 December 1969	1972–1974	Baltic Fleet	Sold to Poland on 19 January 1988, renamed ORP Warszawa
Sderzhanny - Restrained	Shipyard named after 61 Communards, Nikolayev	25 February 1972	30 December 1973		Black Sea Fleet	Disarmed 29 May 2001, dismantled in May 2002 in Inkerman, Sevastopol

=== Indian Navy ===
Five further vessels were ordered by the Indian Navy as the Rajput Class, incoporating further modifications. While the modified Kashin class destroyers had their surface-to-surface missile launchers on their aft, the Rajput destroyers have them positioned in the forward direction. Further, the helicopter deck was enlarged and a helicopter elevator replaced the aft 76 mm gun mount of the Kashin class destroyers.

Name	Pennant	Builder	Commissioned	Status
INS Rajput	D51	61 Kommunara Shipbuilding Plant	30 September 1980	Decommissioned
INS Rana	D52	61 Kommunara Shipbuilding Plant	28 June 1982	Active
INS Ranjit	D53	61 Kommunara Shipbuilding Plant	28 November 1983	Decommissioned
INS Ranvir	D54	61 Kommunara Shipbuilding Plant	28 October 1986	Active
INS Ranvijay	D55	61 Kommunara Shipbuilding Plant	15 January 1988	Active
