= Soviet destroyer Smetlivy =

Smetlivy is the name of the following ships of the Soviet Navy

- Soviet destroyer Smetlivy (1937), a Gnevny-class destroyer sunk by mines in 1941
- Soviet destroyer Smetlivy (1967), a Kashin-class destroyer in commission 1969–2020, now a museum ship
