= Soviet destroyer Slavny =

Two destroyers of the Soviet Navy have been named Slavny:

- Slavny, a Storozhevoy-class destroyer launched in 1939
- Slavny, a Mod Kashin-class destroyer launched in 1965
