= Soviet destroyer Ognevoy =

Ognevoy is the name of the following ships of the Soviet Navy:

- Soviet destroyer Ognevoy (1940), lead Ognevoy-class destroyer
- Soviet destroyer Ognevoy (1963), a Kashin-class destroyer in commission 1964–1989
