= Russian ship Soobrazitelny =

Soobrazitelny (Russian: Сообразительный; lit. "astute"; alternate spellings Soobrazitelnyy, and Soobrazitelnyi) can refer to a number of Russian and Soviet warships:

- Soviet destroyer Soobrazitelny (1940), a Soviet Navy Storozhevoy-class destroyer
- Soviet cruiser Soobrazitelny, a Soviet Navy Kynda-class cruiser renamed Varyag while under construction
- Soviet destroyer Soobrazitelny (1961), a Soviet Navy Kashin-class destroyer
- Russian corvette Soobrazitelny, a Russian Navy Steregushchiy-class corvette
