= Soviet destroyer Smyshlyony =

Smyshlyony is the name of the following ships of the Soviet Navy:

- Soviet destroyer Smyshlyony (1940), a Storozhevoy-class destroyer sunk by a mine in 1942
- Soviet destroyer Smyshlyony (1966), a Kashin-class destroyer, scrapped in 1994
