= Soviet destroyer Provorny (1962) =

Kashin-class destroyer of the Soviet Navy

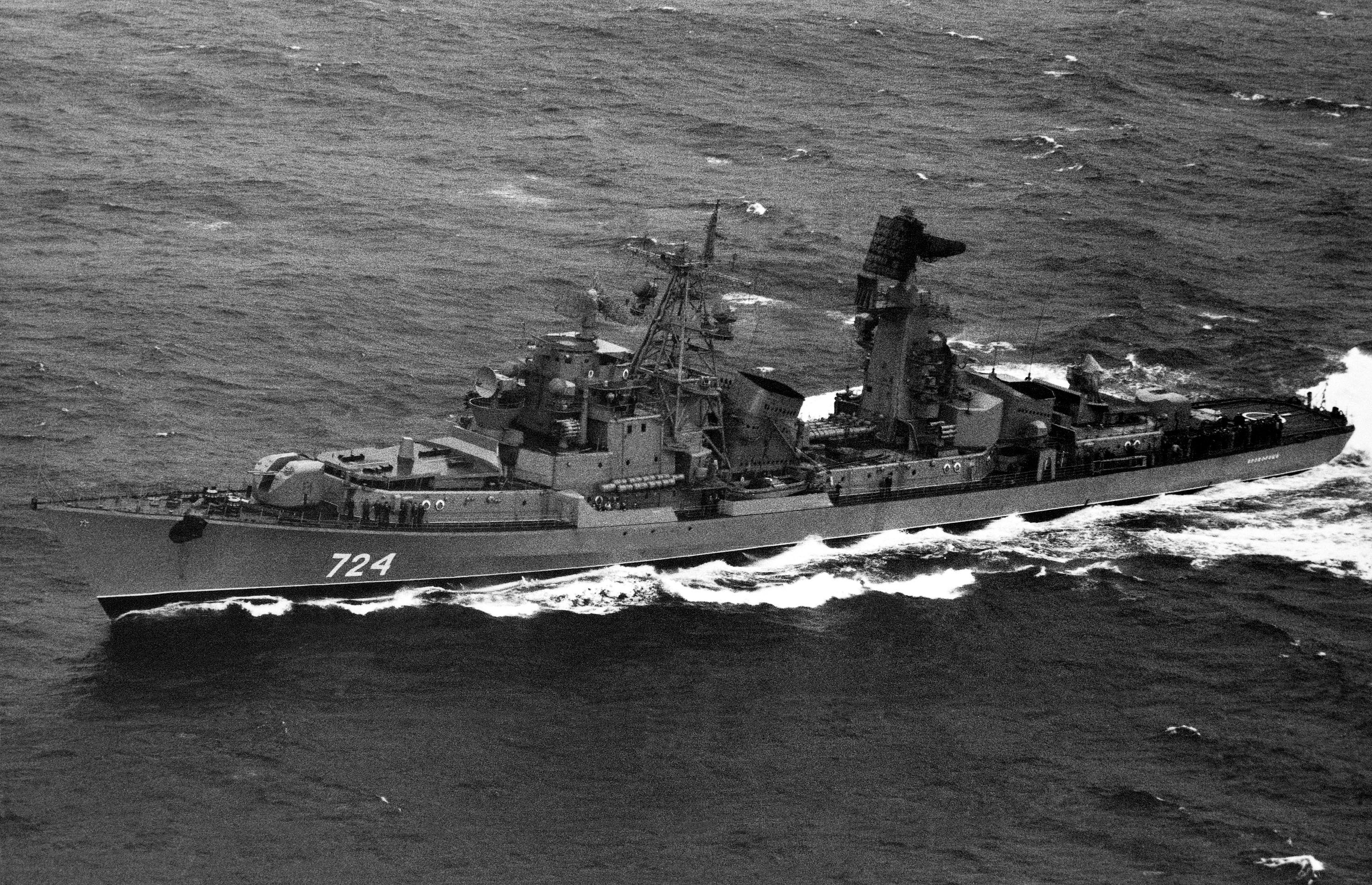
- Provorny in 1982

History

Soviet Union
- Name: Provorny; (Проворный)
- Namesake: Prompt in Russian
- Builder: 61 Communards Shipyard, Nikolayev
- Laid down: 10 February 1961
- Launched: 23 March 1962
- Commissioned: 25 October 1964
- Decommissioned: 21 August 1990
- Renamed: from SKR-37
- Home port: Sevastopol
- Identification: Pennant number: 724
- Fate: Scrapped, 1993

General characteristics
- Class & type: Kashin-class destroyer
- Displacement: 3,400 tons standard, 4,390 tons full load
- Length: 144 m (472 ft)
- Beam: 15.8 m (52 ft)
- Draught: 4.6 m (15 ft)
- Propulsion: 2 × COGAG; 2 shafts, 4 × M8E gas turbines M3 unit aggregate; 72,000 hp (54,000 kW) up to 96,000 hp (72,000 kW)
- Speed: 38 kn (70 km/h; 44 mph) (4 gas turbines on full power)
- Range: 3,500 nmi (6,480 km; 4,030 mi) at 18 kn (33 km/h; 21 mph)
- Complement: 266 to 320
- Armament: 2 × twin 76 mm (3 in) AK-726 guns; 2 × twin SA-N-1 'Goa' surface-to-air missile launchers (32 missiles); 1 × 5 533 mm (21 in) torpedo tubes; 2 × 12 RBU-6000 anti-submarine rocket launchers; 2 × 6 RBU-1000 anti-submarine rocket launchers
- Aircraft carried: 1 x Ka-27 series helicopter
- Aviation facilities: Helipad

Provorny was a Kashin-class destroyer of the Soviet Navy.

== Development and design ==
Late 1950s and 1960s - this is an era of great changes in the history of the navy, an era of new opportunities and new weapons. This was primarily due to the emergence of sea-based nuclear missiles, which turned submarines into strategic weapons. The appearance of nuclear power plants on submarines has greatly increased their autonomy, cruising range, underwater speed and, as a consequence, the severity of the threat they create.

From the very beginning, two options for the main power plant were considered - a traditional steam turbine (STU) and a gas turbine (GTU). The latter, due to its lightness and compactness (specific gravity 5.2 kg / l. From. Versus 9 kg / l. From.), Reduced the ship's displacement from 3600 to 3200 tons and increased efficiency. In addition, starting from a cold state took 5–10 minutes for the GTU compared to the several hours required for the STU. For these reasons, the option with gas turbine engines was adopted.

The armament of the new ship was innovative. For the first time in Soviet shipbuilding, it was equipped with two anti-aircraft missile systems (M-1 "Volna"). Each complex consisted of a two-boom launcher ZIF-101, a Yatagan control system and a magazine with two rotating drums for 8 V-600 missiles each.

== Construction and career ==
Provorny was laid down on 10 February 1961, and launched on 23 March 1962 by 61 Communards Shipyard in Nikolayev. She was commissioned on 25 October 1964.

From 1967 to 1973, the ship twice provided assistance to the Egyptian Armed Forces and the Syrian Armed Forces.

In the period from 2 to 7 July 1973, he visited the French port of Marseille.

On March 22, 1974, Provorny moored at the pier of the 61 Communards plant for overhaul.

From August 22, 1973, to August 27, 1974, the ship was modernized according to Project 61E.

On December 2, 1977, mooring trials began on the ship

In 1981, Provorny made a cruise to the Northern Fleet.

Since 1982, he has been a member of the 70th Brigade of the 30th Division of Anti-submarine Ships.

From March 1, 1987 to March 21, 1988, overhaul began. Then the work was suspended, as the ship had already served its almost 25-year term.

On August 21, 1990, Provorny was removed from the Navy.

On December 31, 1990, Provorny's crew was disbanded.

On February 18, 1993, the ship went to Inkerman for scrap.

== Gallery ==
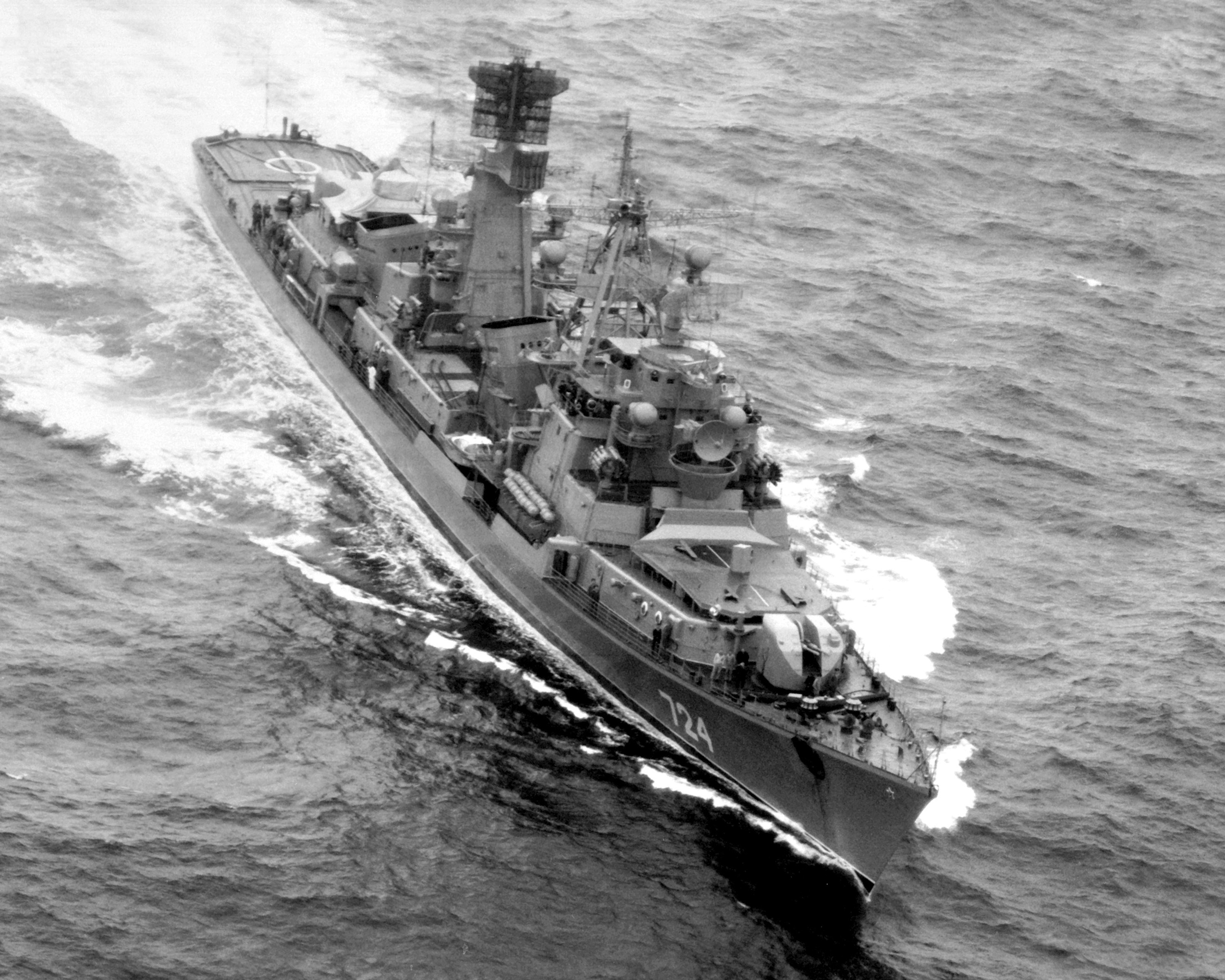
Provorny underway in 1982.

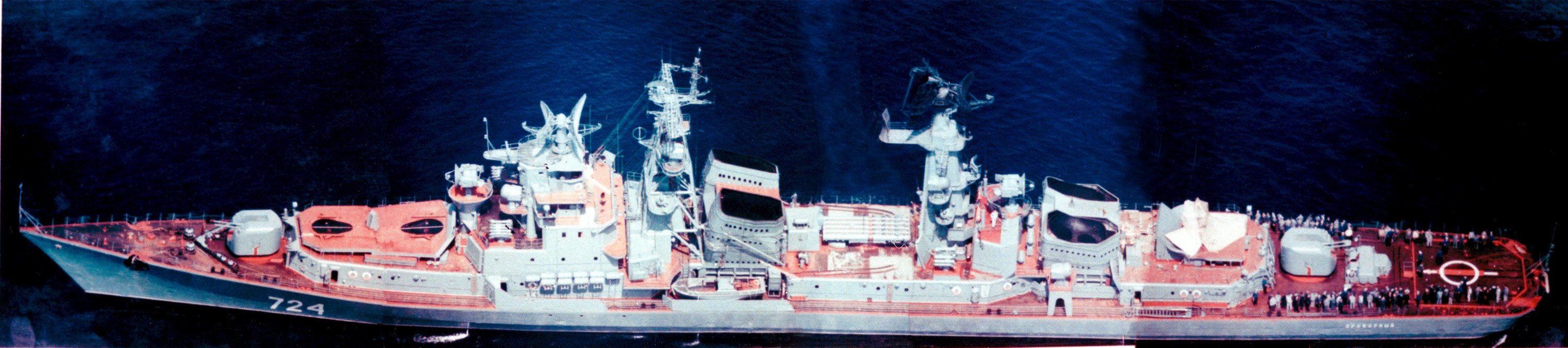
Provorny underway in 1982.
