= Soviet destroyer Krasny Kavkaz =

Destroyer of the Soviet Navy

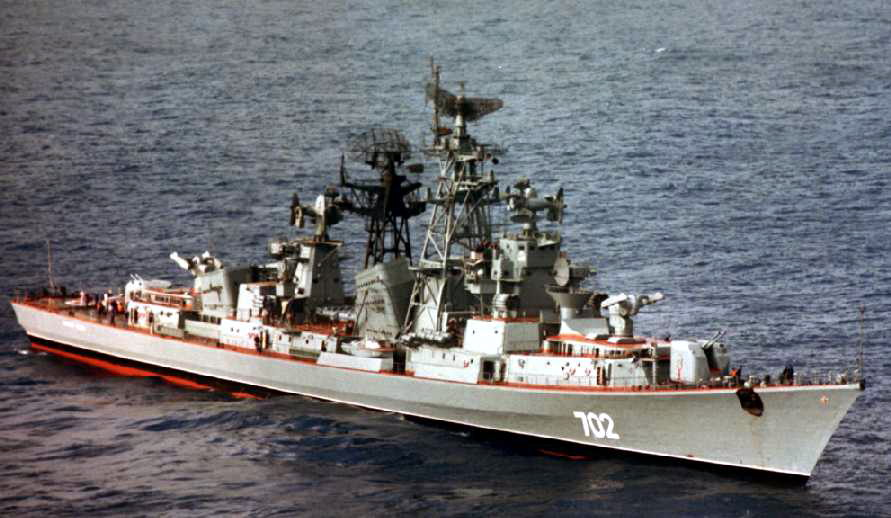

History

→ Soviet Union → Russia
- Name: Krasny Kavkaz
- Builder: 61 Communards Shipyard
- Laid down: 25 November 1964
- Launched: 9 February 1966
- Commissioned: 25 September 1967
- Decommissioned: 1 May 1998
- Fate: Scrapped in 2000

General characteristics
- Class & type: Kashin-class destroyer
- Displacement: 4,460 tons full load
- Complement: 266
- Armament: 2 × twin 76 mm (3 in) AK-726 guns; 2 × twin launchers for SA-N-1 'Goa' SAM (32 missiles); 1 × 5 533 mm (21 in) torpedo tubes; 2 × twelve barrel RBU-6000 ASW rocket launchers; 2 × six barrel RBU-1000 ASW rocket launchers

Krasny Kavkaz (Russian for Red Caucasus) was a Soviet, later Russian Kashin-class destroyer of the Black Sea Fleet.

== Service history ==
From 1 June 1967 to 31 June 1967 and from 1 January to 31 December 1968 the destroyer rendered assistance to the armed forces of Egypt and from 5 October to 24 October 1973 - to the armed forces of Syria. From 10 March 1981 to 19 July 1984 the ship has been repaired in Sevastopol. Krasny Kavkaz was initially tasked with confronting the U.S. warships during the 1988 Black Sea incident, but due to her technical problems the frigate Bezzavetny was dispatched instead.
