= ORP Warszawa (1988) =

Modified Kashin-class destroyer of the Polish Navy

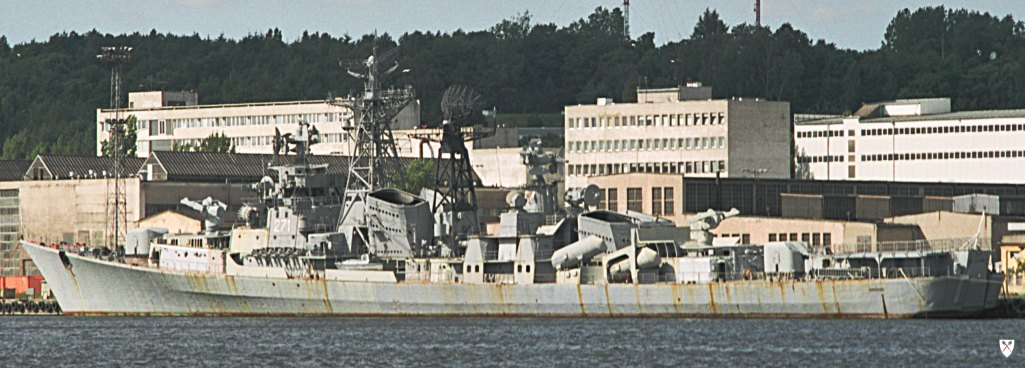
- ORP Warszawa in 2004, on her way to the reserve hangar

History

Soviet Union
- Name: Smely (Russian: Смелый, Valiant)
- Builder: 61 Communards Shipyard
- Laid down: 15 November 1966
- Launched: 6 February 1968
- Commissioned: 27 December 1969
- Decommissioned: 9 January 1988
- Fate: Sold to Poland

Poland
- Name: ORP Warszawa
- Namesake: Warsaw
- Commissioned: 9 January 1988
- Decommissioned: 5 December 2003
- Stricken: 29 August 2005
- Fate: Scrapped in the Gdańsk Shipyard in 2005
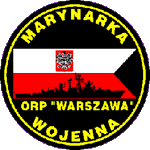
- Badge

General characteristics
- Class & type: Kashin-class destroyer
- Displacement: 3850 to 4950
- Length: 146.20 m (479 ft 8 in)
- Beam: 15.80 m (51 ft 10 in)
- Draft: 4.80-6.80 m (22 ft 4 in)
- Speed: 35 knots (65 km/h; 40 mph)
- Complement: 320
- Armament: 2 × twin 76 mm (3 in) AK-726 guns; 2 × twin launchers for SA-N-1 'Goa' SAM (32 missiles); 4 × SS-N-2C launchers; 1 × 5 533 mm (21 in) torpedo tubes; 2 × twelve barrel RBU-6000 ASW rocket launchers; 2 × six barrel RBU-1000 ASW rocket launchers

ORP Warszawa (Note: Warszawa is the Polish name for Warsaw) (formerly the Soviet Smely) was a large guided missile destroyer of the Polish Navy, one of the last ships of the modified Kashin class.

== Construction ==
She was built in the 61st Communard's Shipyard in Nikolayev, Soviet Union, for the Soviet Navy. Commissioned in 1969, she was one of the ships of the CKB-53 class, dubbed Kashin-class destroyers by NATO.

== Soviet service ==
The ship was among the largest destroyers of the time; with 4950 tonnes of displacement she had similar displacement to many World War II cruisers. The flexible design allowed the ships of her class to serve as multi-purpose vessels rather than standard guided missile destroyers. Among the capabilities of the class were anti-surface and anti-submarine missions, convoy escort, long-range bombardment and a variety of other roles. The ship's armament was almost fully automated and was one of the first such ships in the Eastern Bloc.

== Modernisation ==
Between 1972 and 1974 the ship was modernized to the new 61MP standard, dubbed the modified Kashin class by NATO countries. The modernization included a complete refurbishment, change of armament and mounting of detection and fire control systems.

== Transfer to Poland ==
In 1987 the ship was leased by Poland as a replacement for the obsolete Kotlin class Warszawa. Smelyi was therefore renamed Warszawa on transfer in 1988. Between 1992 and 1993 she was permanently transferred to Poland (along with the submarines Dzik and Wilk) in exchange for Soviet debts at the Polish Navy Shipyard in Gdynia.

== Fate ==
After 16 years of service in the Polish Navy, she was designated to be sold. In the end, no country was interested in purchasing the ship, and finally she was sent to the Navy's reserve. After two years in reserve she was sold for scrap. Breaking up was completed by the Gdańsk Shipyard.
