= Soviet destroyer Soobrazitelny (1961) =

Kashin-class destroyer of the Soviet & Russian Navy

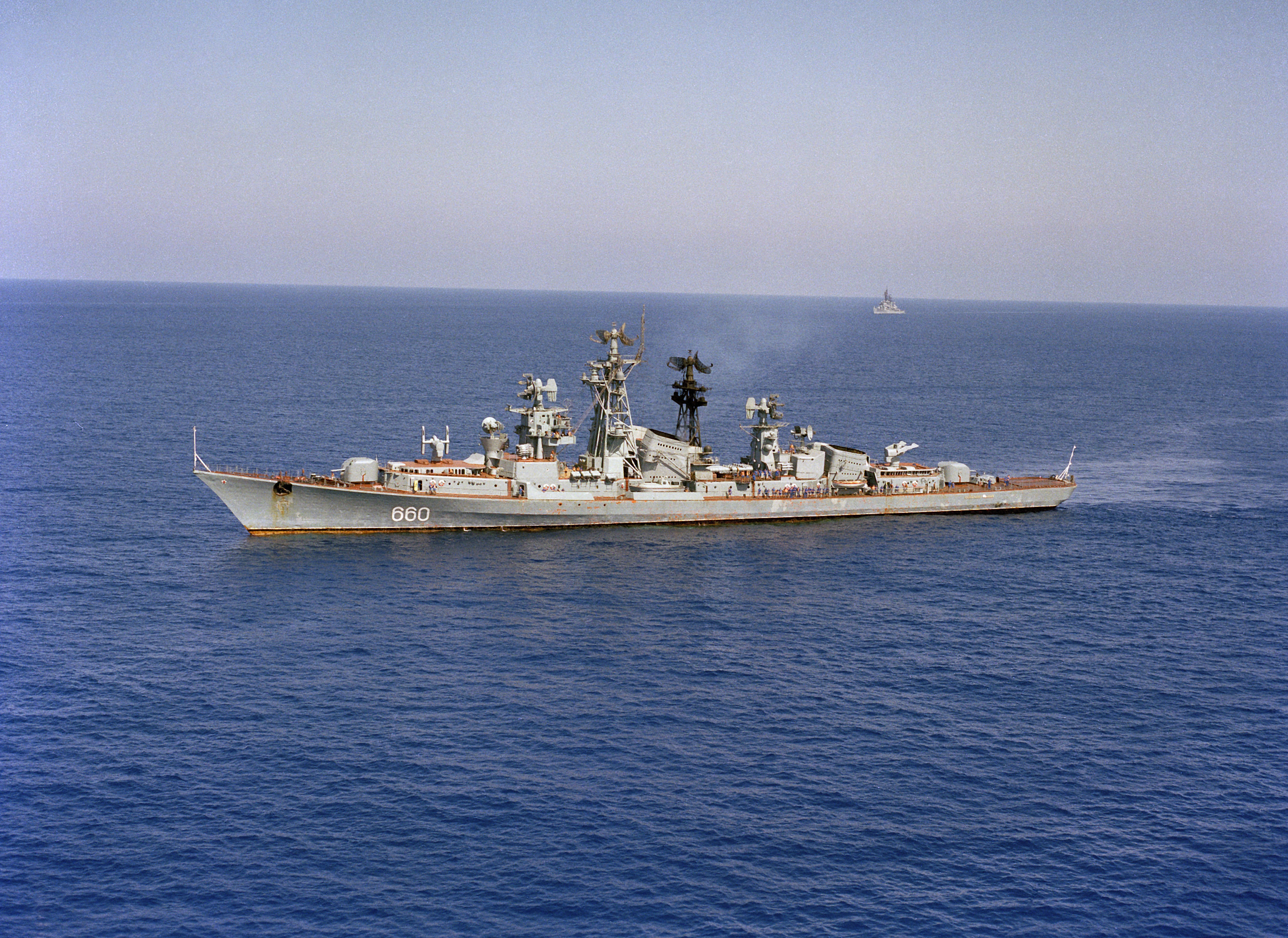
- Soobrazitelny on 29 September 1983

History

Soviet Union → Russia
- Name: Soobrazitelny; (Сообразительный)
- Namesake: Astute in Russian
- Builder: 61 Communards Shipyard, Nikolayev
- Laid down: 20 July 1960
- Launched: 4 November 1961
- Commissioned: 26 December 1963
- Decommissioned: 3 July 1992
- Renamed: from SKR-44
- Home port: Severomorsk
- Identification: Pennant number: 660
- Fate: Scrapped, 1994

General characteristics
- Class & type: Kashin-class destroyer
- Displacement: 3,400 tons standard, 4,390 tons full load
- Length: 144 m (472 ft)
- Beam: 15.8 m (52 ft)
- Draught: 4.6 m (15 ft)
- Propulsion: 2 × COGAG; 2 shafts, 4 × M8E gas turbines M3 unit aggregate; 72,000 hp (54,000 kW) up to 96,000 hp (72,000 kW)
- Speed: 38 kn (70 km/h; 44 mph) (4 gas turbines on full power)
- Range: 3,500 nmi (6,480 km; 4,030 mi) at 18 kn (33 km/h; 21 mph)
- Complement: 266 to 320
- Armament: 2 × twin 76 mm (3 in) AK-726 guns; 2 × twin SA-N-1 'Goa' surface-to-air missile launchers (32 missiles); 1 × 5 533 mm (21 in) torpedo tubes; 2 × 12 RBU-6000 anti-submarine rocket launchers; 2 × 6 RBU-1000 anti-submarine rocket launchers
- Aircraft carried: 1 x Ka-27 series helicopter
- Aviation facilities: Helipad

Soobrazitelny was a Kashin-class destroyer of the Soviet Navy.

== Development and design ==
Late 1950s and 1960s - this is an era of great changes in the history of the navy, an era of new opportunities and new weapons. This was primarily due to the emergence of sea-based nuclear missiles, which turned submarines into strategic weapons. The appearance of nuclear power plants on submarines has greatly increased their autonomy, cruising range, underwater speed and, as a consequence, the severity of the threat they create.

From the very beginning, two options for the main power plant were considered - a traditional steam turbine (STU) and a gas turbine (GTU). The latter, due to its lightness and compactness (specific gravity 5.2 kg / l. From. Versus 9 kg / l. From.), Reduced the ship's displacement from 3600 to 3200 tons and increased efficiency. In addition, starting from a cold state took 5–10 minutes for the GTU compared to the several hours required for the STU. For these reasons, the option with gas turbine engines was adopted.

The armament of the new ship was innovative. For the first time in Soviet shipbuilding, it was equipped with two anti-aircraft missile systems (M-1 "Volna"). Each complex consisted of a two-boom launcher ZIF-101, a Yatagan control system and a magazine with two rotating drums for 8 V-600 missiles each.

== Construction and career ==
Soobrazitelny was laid down on 22 January 1963, and launched on 11 September 1964 by 61 Communards Shipyard in Nikolayev. She was commissioned on 26 December 1963.

On 3 July 1992, she was decommissioned and scrapped in 1994.
