= Soviet destroyer Sderzhanny =

Kashin-class destroyer of the Soviet Navy

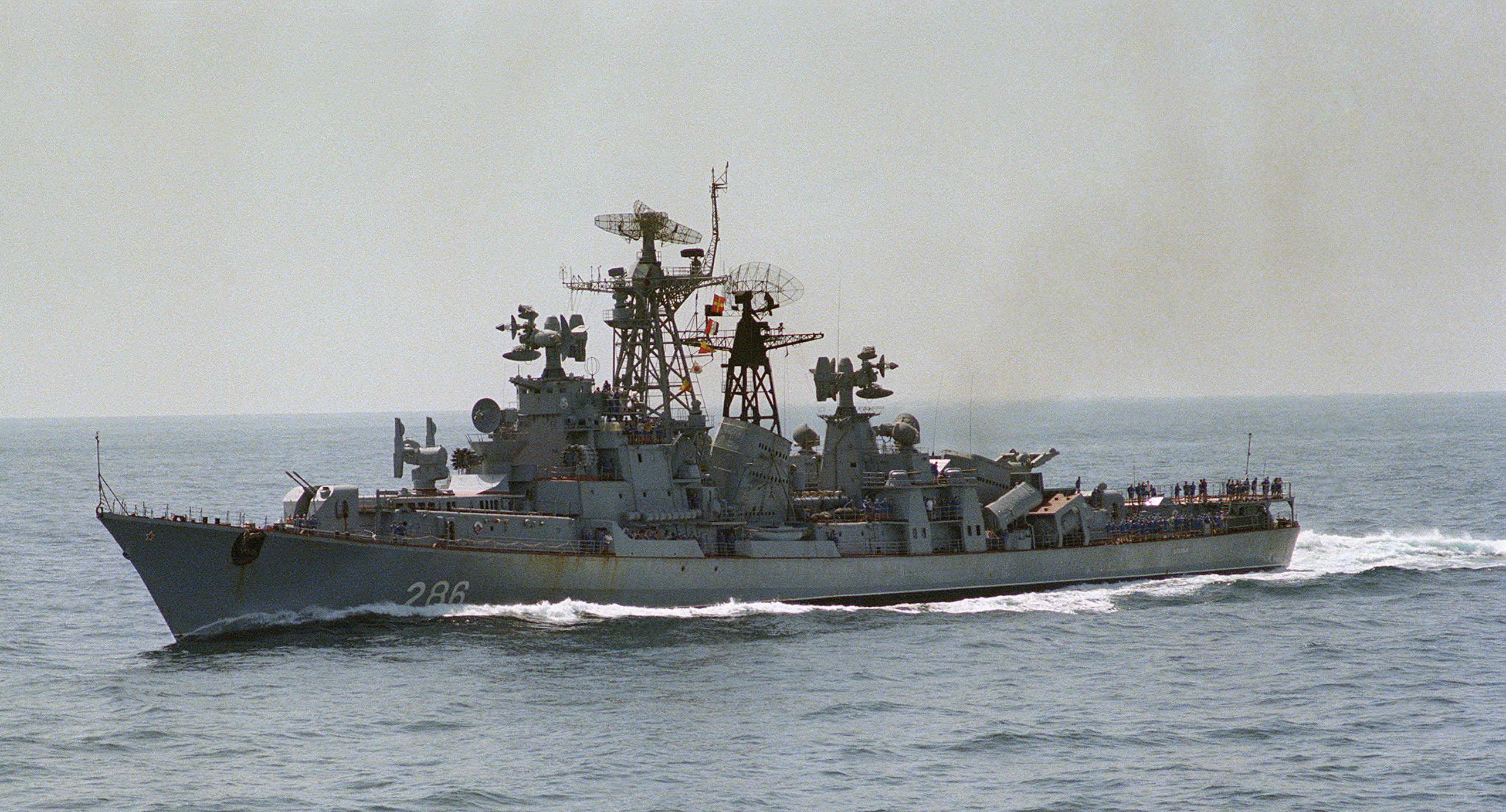
- Sderzhanny on 10 March 1980

History

Soviet Union → Russia
- Name: Sderzhanny; (Сдержанный)
- Namesake: Restrained in Russian
- Builder: 61 Communards Shipyard, Nikolayev
- Laid down: 10 March 1971
- Launched: 29 February 1972
- Commissioned: 30 December 1973
- Decommissioned: 3 May 2001
- Identification: Pennant number: 286
- Fate: Scrapped, 2002

General characteristics
- Class & type: Kashin-class destroyer
- Displacement: 3,950 tons standard
- Length: 146 m (479 ft)
- Beam: 15.8 m (52 ft)
- Draught: 4.8 m (16 ft)
- Propulsion: 2 × COGAG; 2 shafts, 4 × M8E gas turbines M3 unit aggregate; 72,000 hp (54,000 kW) up to 96,000 hp (72,000 kW)
- Speed: 35 kn (65 km/h; 40 mph) (4 gas turbines on full power)
- Range: 3,500 nmi (6,480 km; 4,030 mi) at 18 kn (33 km/h; 21 mph)
- Complement: 320
- Armament: 2 × twin 76 mm (3 in) AK-726 guns; 2 × twin SA-N-1 'Goa' surface-to-air missile launchers (32 missiles); 1 × 5 533 mm (21 in) torpedo tubes; 4 × 30 mm (1 in) CIWS; 2 × 12 RBU-6000 anti-submarine rocket launchers
- Aircraft carried: 1 x Ka-25 series helicopter
- Aviation facilities: Helipad

Sderzhanny was a Kashin-class destroyer of the Soviet Navy.

== Development and design ==
Late 1950s and 1960s - this is an era of great changes in the history of the navy, an era of new opportunities and new weapons. This was primarily due to the emergence of sea-based nuclear missiles, which turned submarines into strategic weapons. The appearance of nuclear power plants on submarines has greatly increased their autonomy, cruising range, underwater speed and, as a consequence, the severity of the threat they create.

From the very beginning, two options for the main power plant were considered - a traditional steam turbine (STU) and a gas turbine (GTU). The latter, due to its lightness and compactness (specific gravity 5.2 kg / l. From. Versus 9 kg / l. From.), Reduced the ship's displacement from 3600 to 3200 tons and increased efficiency. In addition, starting from a cold state took 5–10 minutes for the GTU compared to the several hours required for the STU. For these reasons, the option with gas turbine engines was adopted.

The armament of the new ship was innovative. For the first time in Soviet shipbuilding, it was equipped with two anti-aircraft missile systems (M-1 "Volna"). Each complex consisted of a two-boom launcher ZIF-101, a Yatagan control system and a magazine with two rotating drums for 8 V-600 missiles each.

== Construction and career ==
Sderzhanny was laid down on 10 March 1971, and launched on 29 February 1972 by 61 Communards Shipyard in Nikolayev. She was commissioned on 30 December 1973.

On 3 May 2001, she was decommissioned and scrapped in 2002.
