= Russian destroyer Smetlivy =

Soviet and Russian naval vessel

Coordinates: 44°36′46″N 33°31′46″E

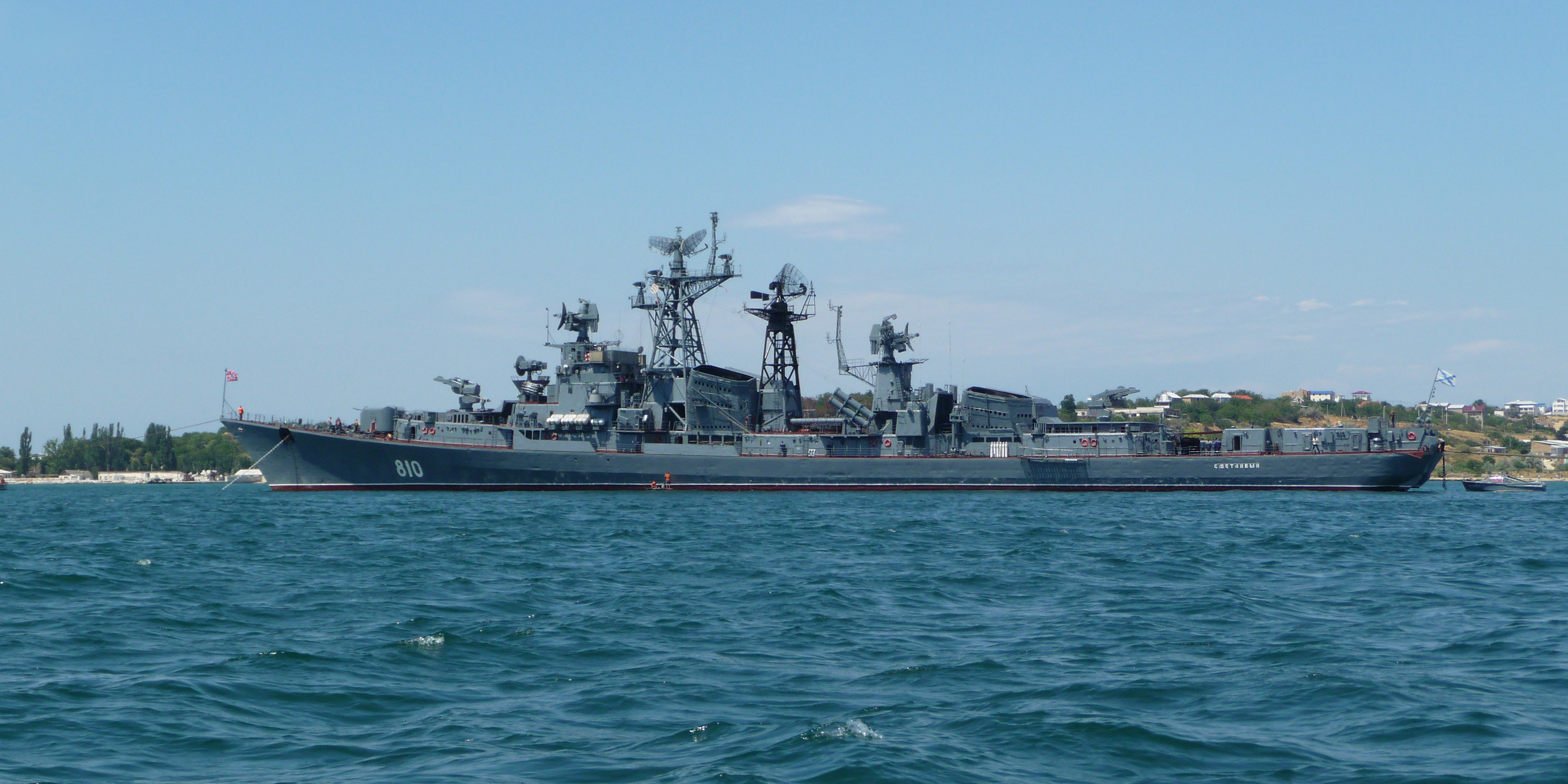
- Smetlivy in 2009

History

→ Soviet Union → Russia
- Name: Smetlivy
- Builder: 61 Communards Shipyard
- Laid down: 15 July 1966
- Launched: 26 August 1967
- Commissioned: 25 September 1969
- Decommissioned: 27 August 2020
- Status: Opened as Museum in Sevastopol

General characteristics
- Class & type: Kashin-class destroyer
- Displacement: 3,720 tons standard, 4,750 tons full load
- Length: 144 m (472.4 ft)
- Beam: 15.8 m (51.8 ft)
- Propulsion: 2 × COGAG; 2 shafts, 4 × M8E gas turbines; 72,000 hp (54,000 kW) up to 96,000 hp (72,000 kW)
- Speed: 38 knots (70 km/h; 44 mph) (4 gas turbines on full power)
- Range: 3,500 nmi (6,480 km; 4,030 mi) at 18 kn (33 km/h; 21 mph); 2,000 nmi (3,700 km; 2,300 mi) at 30 kn (56 km/h; 35 mph)
- Complement: 274
- Armament: 1 × 2 76 mm (3 in) AK-726 guns, SAM: 2 × twin launchers for SA-N-1 'Goa' SAM (32 missiles); 1 × 5 533 mm (21 in) torpedo tubes, 2 × 12 barrel RBU-6000 ASW rocket launchers, 2 × 4 launchers for SS-N-25 'Switchblade' anti-ship missiles

Smetlivy (Russian: Сметливый, lit. 'Resourceful') was a Kashin-class guided missile destroyer of the Russian Navy. Entering service in 1969, the ship served until 1991 with the fall of the Soviet Union. She returned to service in 1995 after a refit and was made part of the Black Sea Fleet. From 2011 to 2020 she was the oldest active destroyer in the world. The ship was decommissioned in 2020 to become a museum ship.

== Service history ==
Ordered by the Soviet Union in the early 1960s, Smetlivy was laid down in July 1966 and commissioned into the Soviet Black Sea Fleet in 1969. In 1990 the ship was laid up for repairs and modification. She became part of the Russian Navy after the collapse of the Soviet Union in 1991. The ship returned to service in 1995, now armed with the more modern SS-N-25 Switchblade missile system.

In August 2008 the ship took part in the Russo-Georgian War, and was part of a task force from a Black Sea Fleet enforcing de facto blockade of the Republic of Georgia. In 2009 the ship was again laid up for repairs, returning to service in mid-2011 and being involved in Russian-Italian naval exercises in the Mediterranean Sea. As of 2013 Smetlivy is the last Kashin-class destroyer in service with the Russian Navy.

In 2013, she was sent off the coast of Syria in response to military tensions and a buildup of Western naval forces. Smetlivy returned to Syria in September 2015. During the Syrian deployment, Smetlivy fired warning shots at a Turkish fishing vessel on 13 December 2015 after the Turkish ship reportedly did not respond to radio calls or signal flares to turn away from the destroyer. The Turkish fishing vessel Geçiciler-1 in its own accord has reported to the Turkish Coast Guard that no shots were detected from Smetlivy and that they passed the static Russian ship from a mile distance and continued with their fishing undisturbed. Video material from Geçiciler-1 has been handed over to the Turkish Coast Guard.
