= Soviet destroyer Ognevoy (1963) =

Kashin-class destroyer of the Soviet Navy

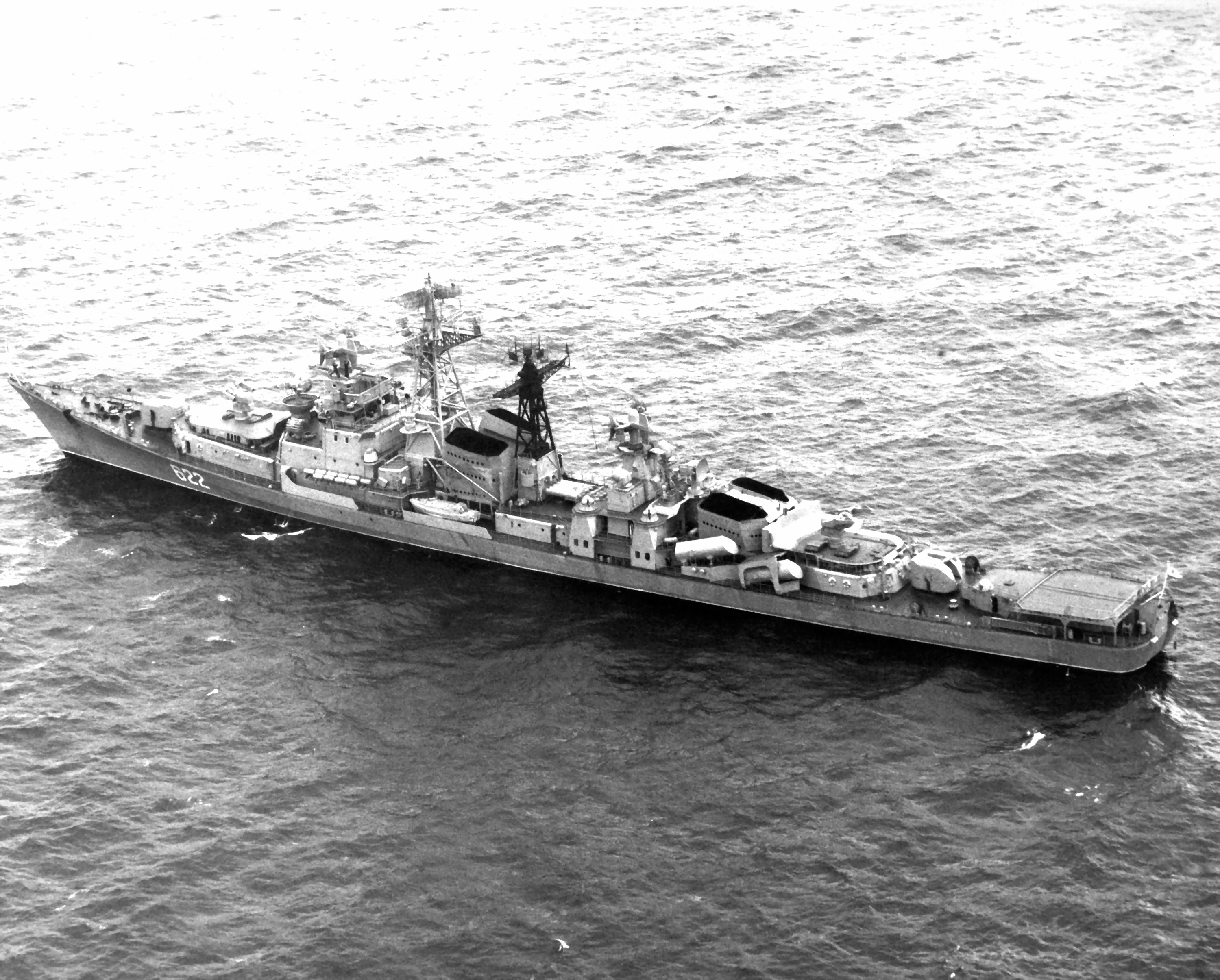
- Ognevoy on 14 May 1986

History

Soviet Union
- Name: Ognevoy; (Огневой)
- Namesake: Fiery in Russian
- Builder: Zhdanov, Leningrad
- Laid down: 9 May 1962
- Launched: 31 May 1963
- Commissioned: 31 December 1964
- Decommissioned: 25 April 1989
- Identification: Pennant number: 622

General characteristics
- Class & type: Kashin-class destroyer
- Displacement: 3,950 tons standard
- Length: 146 m (479 ft)
- Beam: 15.8 m (52 ft)
- Draught: 4.8 m (16 ft)
- Propulsion: 2 × COGAG; 2 shafts, 4 × M8E gas turbines M3 unit aggregate; 72,000 hp (54,000 kW) up to 96,000 hp (72,000 kW)
- Speed: 35 kn (65 km/h; 40 mph) (4 gas turbines on full power)
- Range: 3,500 nmi (6,480 km; 4,030 mi) at 18 kn (33 km/h; 21 mph)
- Complement: 320
- Armament: 2 × twin 76 mm (3 in) AK-726 guns; 2 × twin SA-N-1 'Goa' surface-to-air missile launchers (32 missiles); 1 × 5 533 mm (21 in) torpedo tubes; 4 × 30 mm (1 in) CIWS; 2 × 12 RBU-6000 anti-submarine rocket launchers
- Aircraft carried: 1 x Ka-25 series helicopter
- Aviation facilities: Helipad

Ognevoy was a Kashin-class destroyer of the Soviet Navy.

== Development and design ==
Late 1950s and 1960s was an era of considerable advancement for the navy, primarily due to the emergence of sea-based nuclear missiles, which turned submarines into strategic weapons. The introduction of nuclear power plants on submarines greatly increased their autonomy, cruising range, underwater speed, and thus the severity of the threat they posed.

From the very beginning, two options for the main power plant were considered - a traditional steam turbine (STU) and a gas turbine (GTU). The latter, due to its lightness and compactness (specific gravity 5.2 kg / l. From. Versus 9 kg / l. From.), Reduced the ship's displacement from 3600 to 3200 tons and increased efficiency. In addition, starting from a cold state took 5–10 minutes for the GTU compared to the several hours required for the STU. For these reasons, the option with gas turbine engines was adopted.

The armament of the new ship was innovative. For the first time in Soviet shipbuilding, it was equipped with two anti-aircraft missile systems (M-1 "Volna"). Each complex consisted of a two-boom launcher ZIF-101, a Yatagan control system and a magazine with two rotating drums for 8 V-600 missiles each.

== Construction and career ==
Ognevoy was laid down on 9 May 1962, and launched on 31 May 1963 by Zhdanov Shipyard in Leningrad. She was commissioned on 31 December 1964.

On 25 April 1989, she was decommissioned and scrapped in 1990.
