= Kashin-class destroyer =

Class of Soviet anti-aircraft guided-missile destroyers

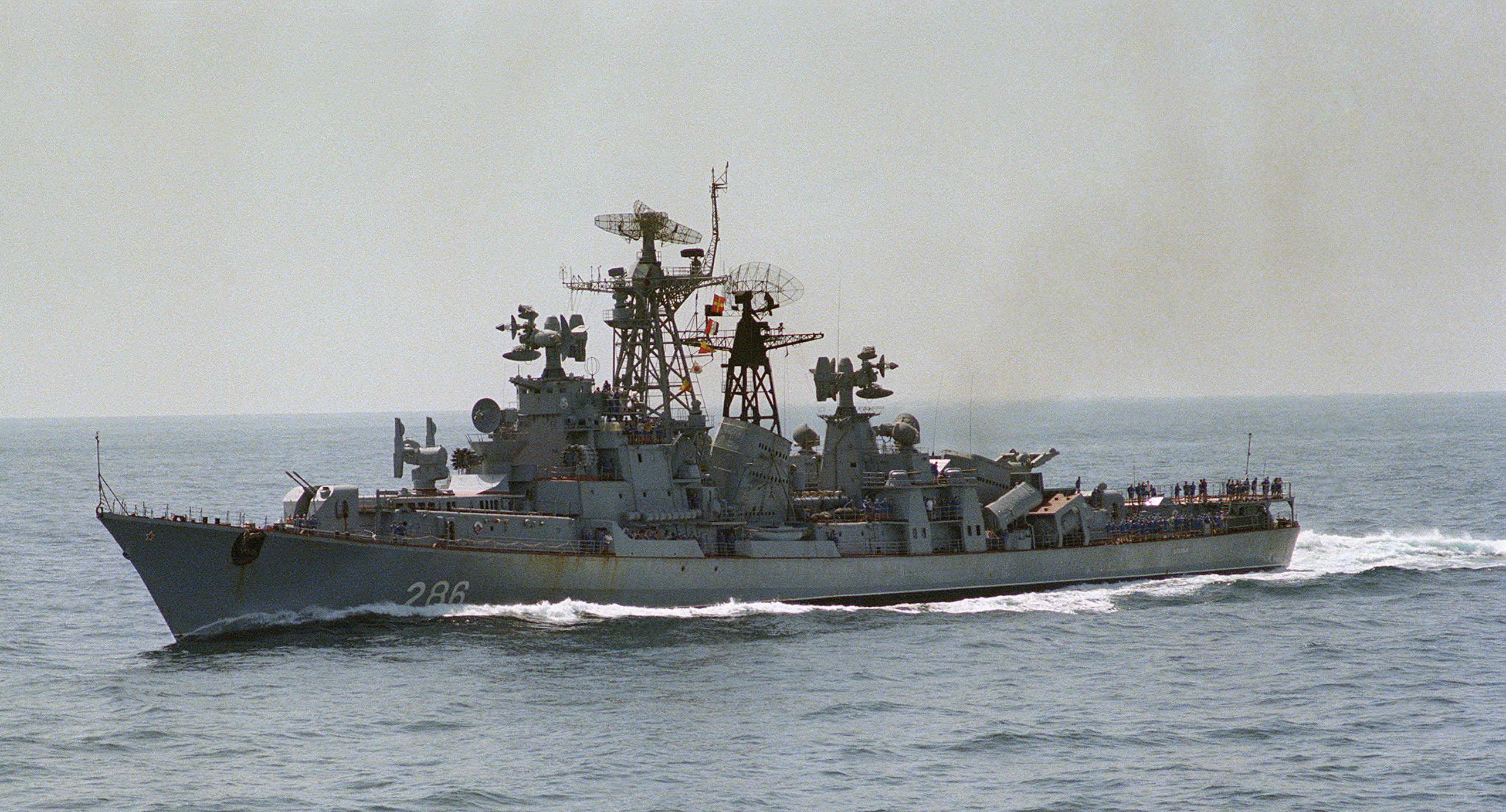
- Sderzhanny in 1980

Class overview
- Name: Kashin class
- Builders: Shipyard No.445 (61 Kommunar) (20); Shipyard No.190 (Zhdanov) (5)
- Operators: Soviet Navy; Russian Navy; Polish Navy; Indian Navy
- Preceded by: Kanin class
- Succeeded by: Sovremenny class
- Subclasses: Mod Kashin class; Rajput class
- Built: 1959–1973
- In commission: 1962–2020
- Completed: 25
- Active: 3
- Lost: 1
- Retired: 20
- Preserved: 1

General characteristics
- Type: Anti-Submarine / Guided-missile destroyer
- Displacement: 3,400 tons standard, 4,390 tons full load
- Length: 144 m (472 ft)
- Beam: 15.8 m (52 ft)
- Draught: 4.6 m (15 ft)
- Propulsion: 2 × COGAG; 2 shafts, 4 × M8E gas turbines M3 unit aggregate; 72,000 hp (54,000 kW) up to 96,000 hp (72,000 kW)
- Speed: 38 kn (70 km/h; 44 mph) (4 gas turbines on full power)
- Range: 3,500 nmi (6,480 km; 4,030 mi) at 18 kn (33 km/h; 21 mph)
- Endurance: 10 Days
- Complement: 266 to 320
- Sensors & processing systems: MR-300 "Angara" air/surface search radars; ARP-50R radio direction finder; MGK-335 Platina sonar (Project 61M); Planshet-61 Combat Information Control System; Pult-61M Weapon FCS
- Electronic warfare & decoys: Krab-11 ESM radar system; Krab-12 ESM radar system; MP-401 Start ESM radar system (Project 61M)
- Armament: 2 × 2 AK-726 76 mm (3 in) guns; 2 × 2 SA-N-1 'Goa' surface-to-air missile launchers (32 missiles); 1 × 5 533 mm (21 in) torpedo tubes; 2 × 12 RBU-6000 anti-submarine rocket launchers; 2 × 6 RBU-1000 anti-submarine rocket launchers; 4 × 1 SS-N-2 ‘Styx’ anti-ship missiles (Project 61M); 2 × 4 SS-N-25 'Switchblade' anti-ship missiles (Smetlivy)
- Aircraft carried: 1 × Ka-25 series helicopter
- Aviation facilities: Helipad

The Kashin class, Soviet designation Project 61, is a series of anti-aircraft guided-missile destroyers, majority of which was built for the Soviet Navy during the 1960s, and which became the first class of major warships in the world to be powered solely by gas turbine engines. As of 2026, no ships of this class remain in service with the Russian Navy, but three modified ships built in the late 1970s - early 1980s continue their service with the Indian Navy as Rajput-class destroyers.

At first, these ships were officially classified in Soviet Union as "guard ships" (Storozhevoi Korabl – SKR), later as "large anti-submarine ships" (Bol'shoi Protivolodochniy Korabl - BPK) or "large missile ships" (Bol'shoi Raketniy Korabl - BRK); in the West they are commonly regarded as guided-missile destroyers due to their size and armament. They were the first Soviet purpose-built anti-air warfare ships.

== Design ==
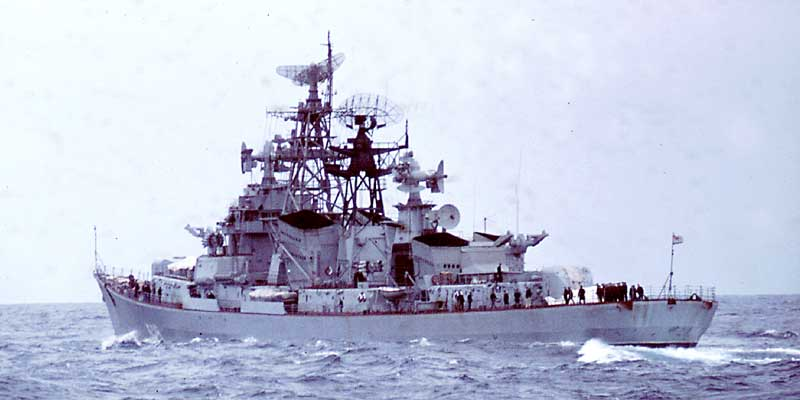
A Kashin-class destroyer in the Mediterranean in January 1970.

The design specification was approved in 1957; the first ship was laid down in 1959 and commissioned in 1962. Many new components were developed for these ships, including surface-to-air missiles, radars, and gas turbine engines. The gas turbines were arranged in two separate spaces and could be removed via the funnels for servicing. These were also the first Soviet ships designed to be closed down for nuclear fallout and had an operations room deep inside the ship rather than a large bridge.

The final ship in the class, Sderzhanny, was completed to a modified design as the Project 61M or 61MP (Kashin-Mod), being fitted with four SS-N-2C Styx anti-ship missiles, new towed-array sonar, a raised helipad and four close range AK-630 Gatling guns. The two RBU-1000 ASW rocket launchers were mounted aft, but later removed. Six ships were modernised to this standard in the 1970s.

Smetlivy was modernised (Project 01090) at Sevastopol in the early 1990s and fitted with new Kh-35 (SS-N-25 Switchblade, Harpoonski) anti-ship missiles and MNK-300 sonar. In 2020 she decommissioned and opened as a Museum at Sevastopol.

The Rajput-class modification built for the Indian Navy has the aft gun turret replaced by a hangar for a helicopter, as well as SS-N-2C anti-ship missiles on the sides of the bridge.

== Variants ==
- Project 61 (Kashin class): Original design (19 ships).
- Project 61MP (Modified Kashin class): Modernization of the Project 61 vessels (5 ships).
- Project 61M (Modified Kashin class): Upgraded design (1 ship).
- Project 61E (Rajput class): Export version, used by the Indian Navy (5 ships).

== Ships ==
In all, twenty ships were built for the Soviet Navy, one ship (ORP Warszawa) was later transferred to Poland, while five similar ships were built to a modified design for the Indian Navy as Rajput class.

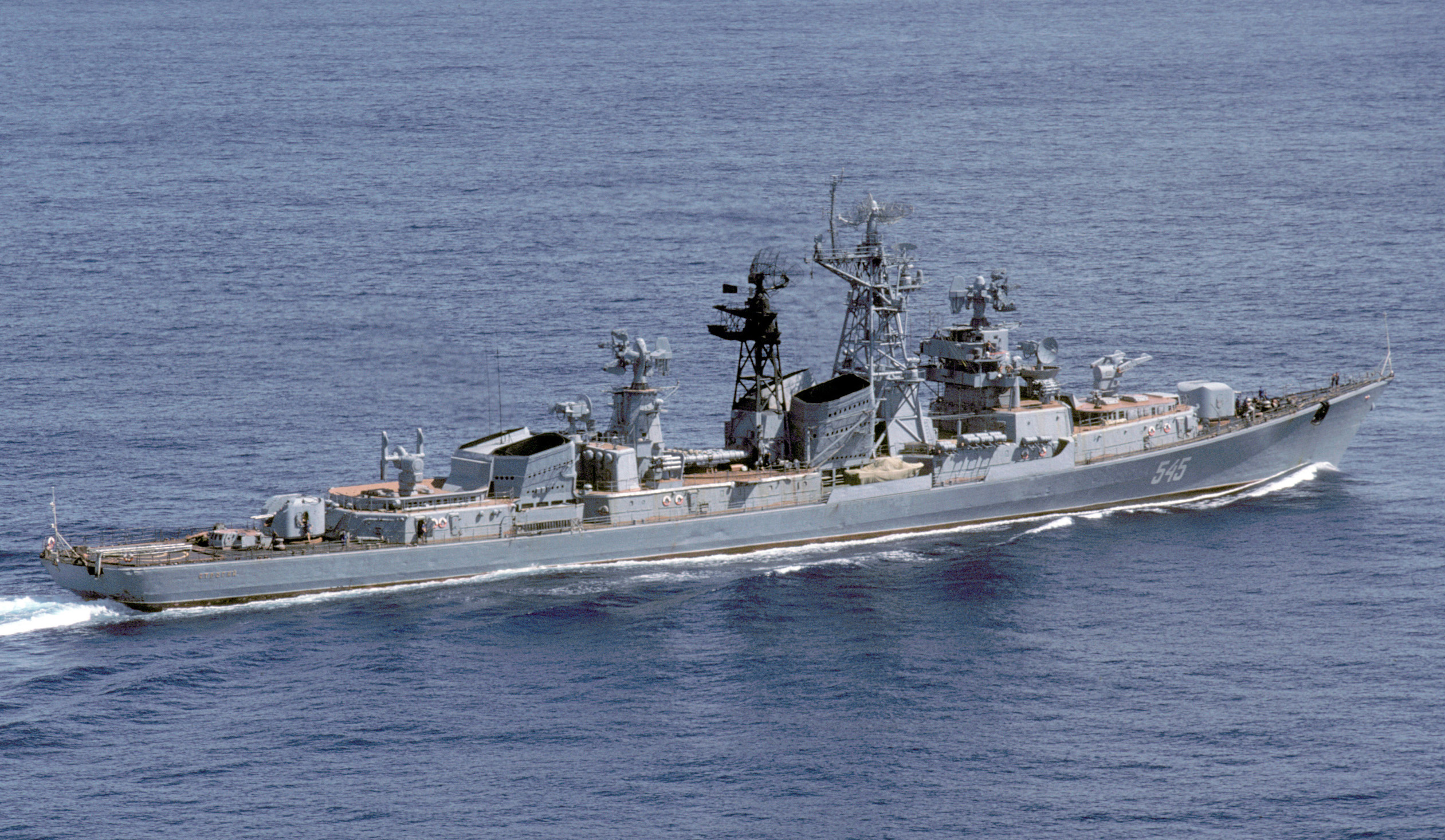
Strogy in October 1985.

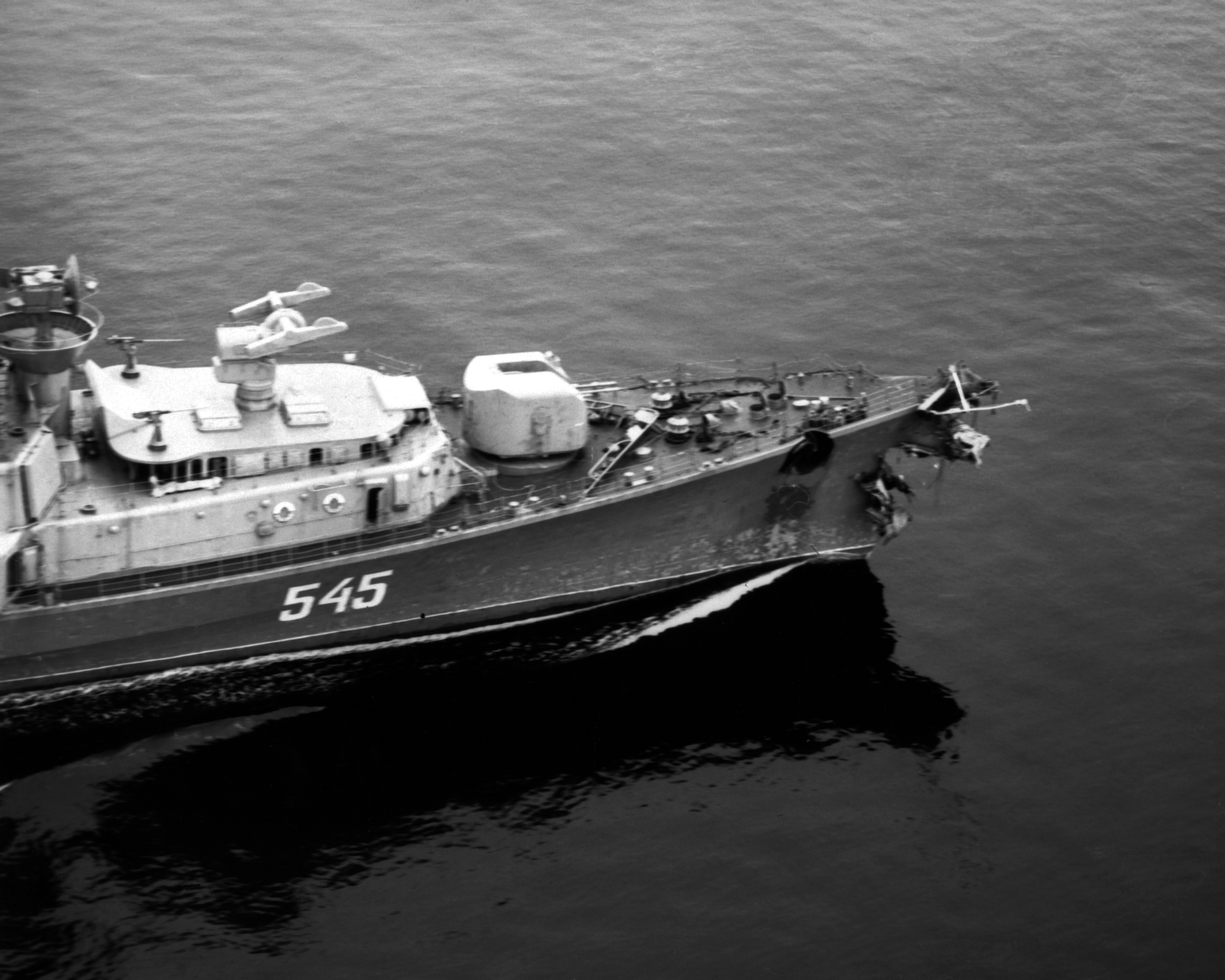
The bow of Strogy after a collision

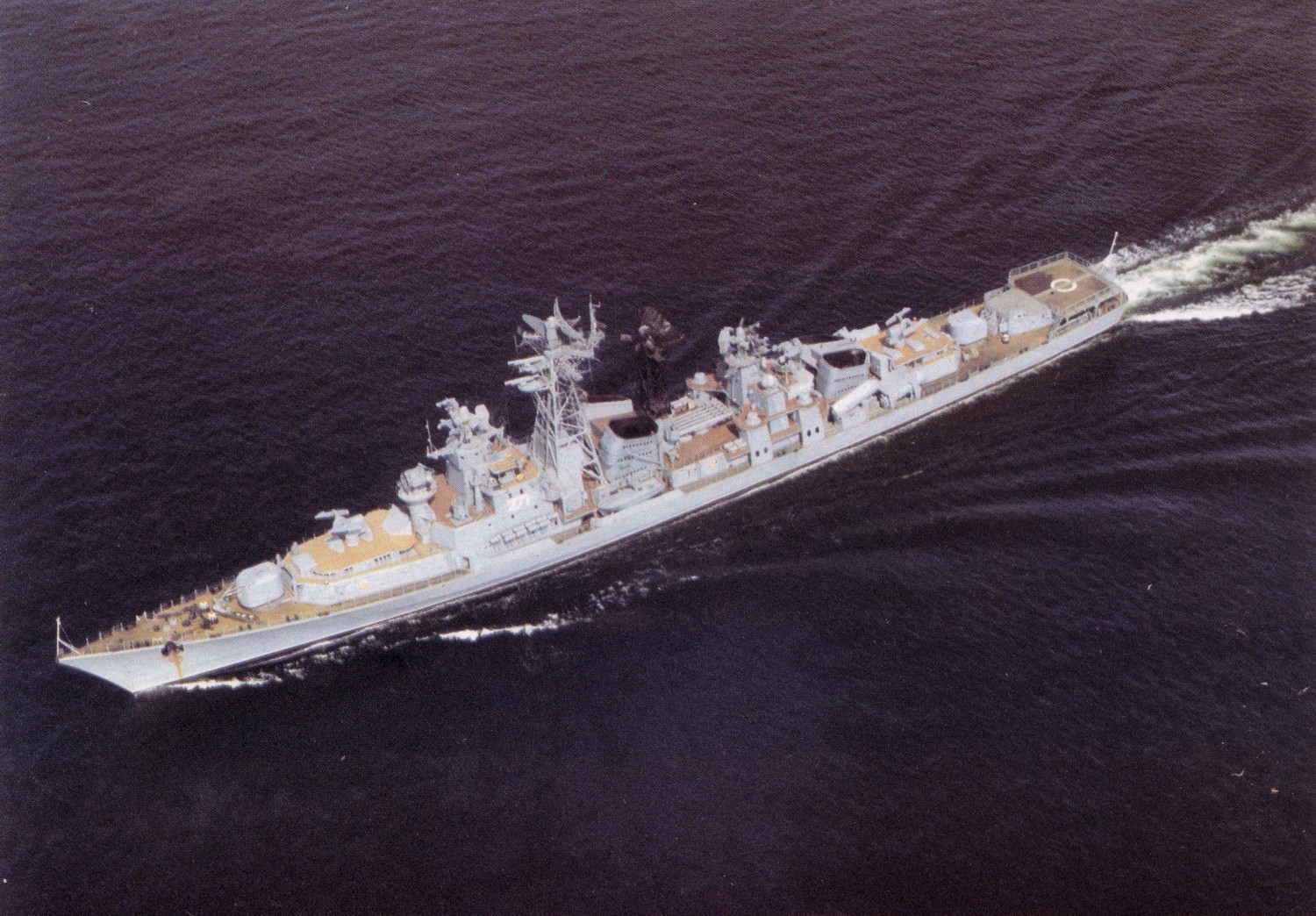
ORP Warszawa

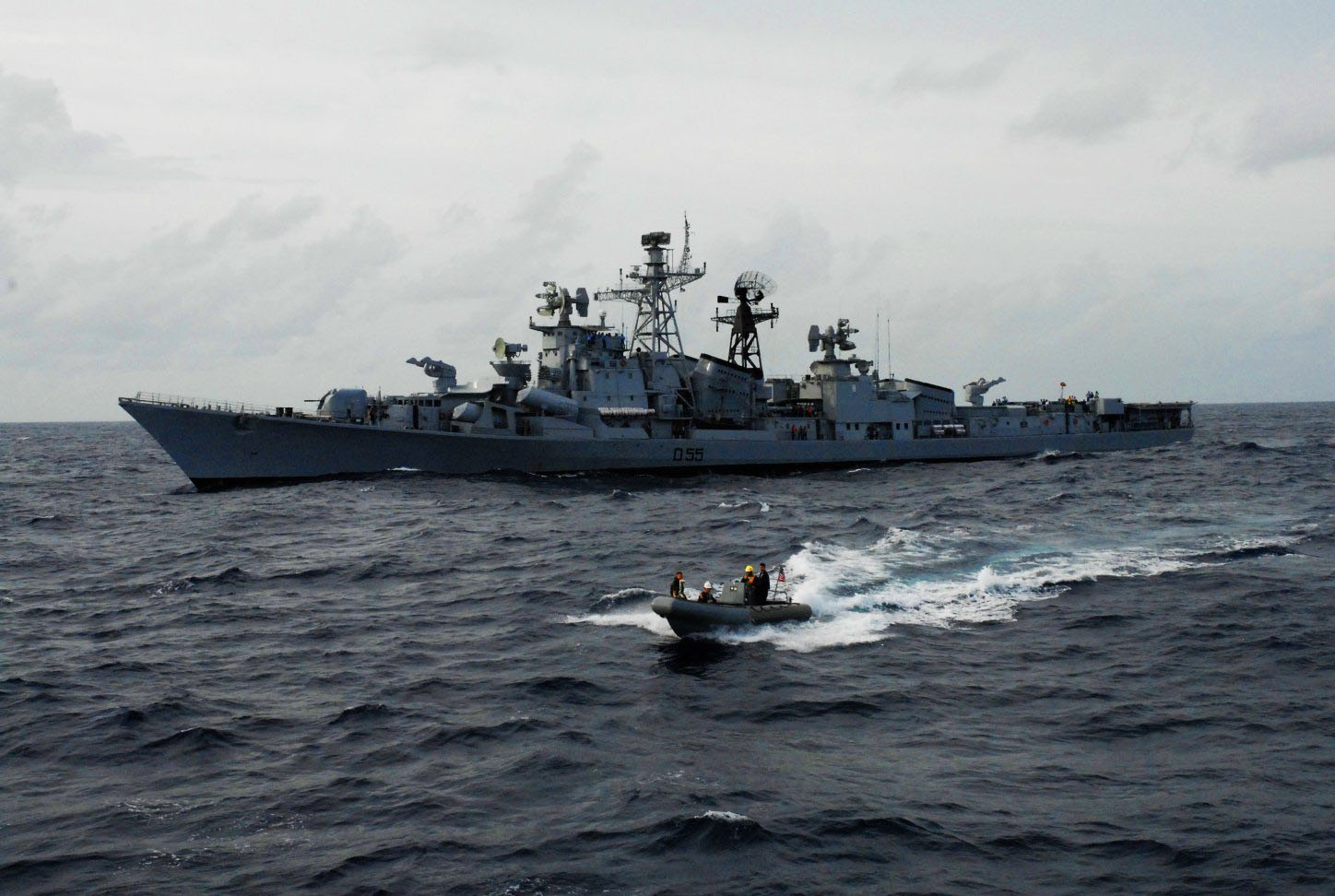
INS Ranvijay

Name	Namesake	Builders	Laid down	Launched	Commissioned	Fleet	Status	Notes
Project 61
Komsomolets Ukrainy (ex-SKR-25)	Komsomol of Ukraine	61 Communards Shipyard	15 September 1959	31 December 1960	31 December 1962	Black Sea	Decommissioned in 1991, scrapped in 1995	
Soobrazitelny (ex-SKR-44)	Astute	61 Communards Shipyard	20 July 1960	4 November 1961	26 December 1963	Northern	Decommissioned in 1992, scrapped in 1994	
Provorny (ex-SKR-37)	Prompt	61 Communards Shipyard	10 February 1961	23 March 1962	25 October 1964	Black Sea	Decommissioned in 1990, scrapped in 1993	In 1974–1977 SA-N-1 'Goa' replaced by SA-N-7 'Gadfly' SAM launcher.
Odaryonny	Talented	Zhdanov Shipyard	22 January 1963	11 September 1964	30 December 1965	Northern	Decommissioned in 1990, scrapped in 1991	Deployed in search for KAL 007 shot down in 1983.
Obraztsovy (ex-SKR-2)	Exemplary	Zhdanov Shipyard	29 July 1963	32 February 1964	20 September 1965	Baltic	Decommissioned in 1993, scrapped in 1995	
Otvazhny (ex-Orel)	Courageous	61 Communards Shipyard	10 August 1963	17 November 1964	31 December 1965	Black Sea	Sunk after a fire on 30 August 1974 caused by a misfiring missile, with 24 fatalities	
Steregushchy	Guarding	Zhdanov Shipyard	26 July 1964	20 February 1966	21 December 1966	Pacific	Decommissioned in 1993, scrapped in 1994	
Krasny Kavkaz	Red Caucasus	61 Communards Shipyard	25 November 1964	9 February 1966	25 September 1967	Black Sea	Decommissioned in 1998, scrapped in 2000	
Reshitelny	Decisive	61 Communards Shipyard	25 June 1965	30 June 1966	30 December 1967	Black Sea	Decommissioned in 1989, scrapped in 1999	
Strogy	Strict	61 Communards Shipyard	22 February 1966	29 April 1967	24 December 1968	Pacific	Decommissioned in 1993	Sold to India, but on the way sank near Singapore in 1995.
Smetlivy	Resourceful	61 Communards Shipyard	15 July 1966	26 August 1967	25 September 1969	Black Sea	Decommissioned in 2020, opened as a Museum in 2021	Modernized in the mid 1990s, eight SS-N-25 'Switchblade' launchers fitted.
Krasny Krym	Red Crimea	61 Communards Shipyard	23 February 1968	28 February 1969	15 October 1970	Black Sea	Decommissioned in 1993, scrapped in 1996	
Sposobny	Capable	61 Communards Shipyard	10 March 1969	11 April 1970	25 September 1971	Pacific	Decommissioned in 1993, scrapped in 1995	
Skory	Fast	61 Communards Shipyard	20 April 1970	26 February 1971	23 September 1972	Black Sea	Decommissioned in 1997, scrapped in 1998	
Project 61MP
Ognevoy (ex-SKR-31)	Fiery	Zhdanov Shipyard	9 May 1962	31 May 1963	31 December 1964		Decommissioned in 1989, scrapped in 1990	
Stroyny	Slim	61 Communards Shipyard	20 April 1963	28 July 1965	15 December 1966		Decommissioned in 1990, scrapped in 1994	
Slavny	Glorious	Zhdanov Shipyard	26 July 1964	24 April 1965	30 September 1966		Decommissioned in 1991, scrapped in 1995	
Smyshlyony	Intelligent	61 Communards Shipyard	15 August 1965	22 October 1966	27 September 1968		Decommissioned in 1993, scrapped in 1994	
ORP Warszawa (ex-Smely)	Warsaw (ex-Valiant)	61 Communards Shipyard	15 November 1966	6 February 1968	27 December 1969		Decommissioned in 2003, scrapped in 2005	Leased to Poland in 1988, bought by Poland in 1992–1993.
Project 61M
Sderzhanny	Restrained	61 Communards Shipyard	10 March 1971	29 February 1972	30 December 1973		Decommissioned in 2001, scrapped in 2002	
Project 61E (Rajput class)
INS Rajput (ex-Nadezhny)	Rajput	61 Communards Shipyard	11 September 1976	17 September 1977	31 November 1979		Decommissioned on 21 May 2021	
INS Rana (ex-Gubitelny)	Maharana Pratap	61 Communards Shipyard	29 November 1976	27 September 1978	30 September 1981		Active	
INS Ranjit (ex-Lovky)	Ranjit Singh	61 Communards Shipyard	29 June 1977	16 June 1979	20 July 1983		Decommissioned in 2019	Sunk during TROPEX-21 exercise.
INS Ranvir (ex-Tvyordy)	Hero of battle	61 Communards Shipyard	24 October 1981	12 March 1983	30 December 1985		Active	
INS Ranvijay (ex-Tolkovy)	Victor of battle	61 Communards Shipyard	19 March 1982	1 February 1986	15 October 1987		Active	

== See also ==
- List of ships of the Soviet Navy
- List of ships of Russia by project number
- List of naval ship classes in service
