= RBU-1000 =

Russian rocket

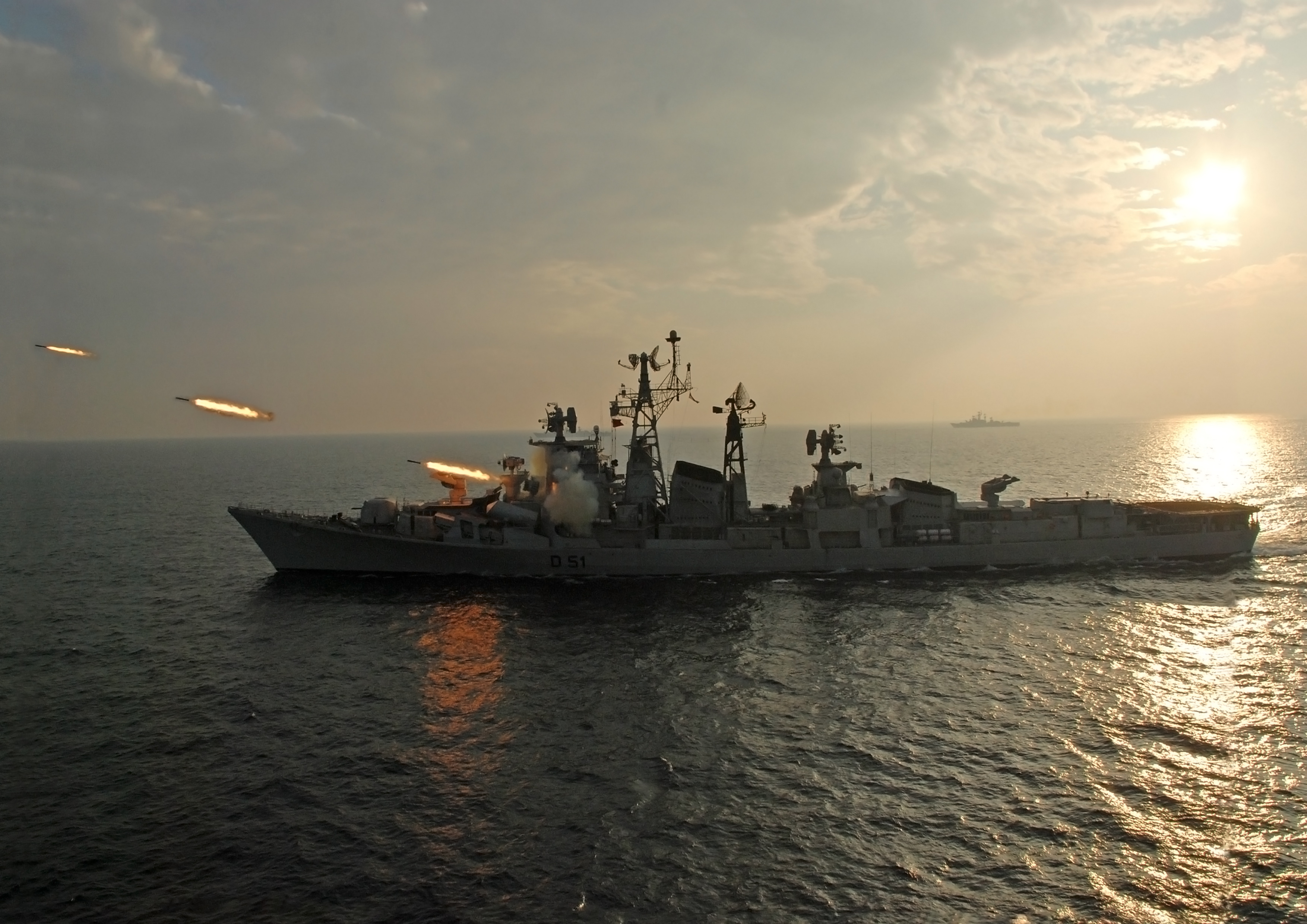
Indian Navy Kashin-class destroyer INS Rajput firing RBU-1000 rockets during a training exercise

The RBU-1000 Smerch-3 is a 300 mm caliber Russian anti-submarine rocket launcher with anti-submarine and anti-torpedo capabilities. It entered service around 1962–1963. It is similar in operation to the Hedgehog system used during Second World War. The RBU-1000 is remotely aimed by the Burya fire control system, which is also used by the RBU-6000 system. It is crewed by three men: two in the magazine room and one in the control center.

The launcher consists of six barrels which are automatically loaded one at a time from a below deck magazine that holds either 60 or 48 rounds per launcher. The system's reaction time is around two minutes between initial target detection and the first salvo reaching the target, though this can be reduced to under one minute if some target data is pre-entered (for example depth and speed). A salvo consists of 1, 2, 4 or 6 RGB-10 rockets, with a gap of around a second between successive rockets. Reloading takes less than three minutes.

The rockets travel in a ballistic arc and strike the water, sinking rapidly and are either detonated when reaching a depth set at launch or on impact with a target.

RBU-1000 has been used extensively and often would be operated side by side with a RBU-6000.

RBU-1000 are currently used onboard Kashin-class destroyers (Project 61).

== Specifications ==
=== Launcher ===
- Weight: 2900 kg
- Length: 2165 mm
- Width: 2000 mm
- Height: 2030 mm
- Traverse rate: 30 °/sec
- Crew: 4

=== RGB-10 (РГБ-10) rocket ===
- Range: 100 m to 1000 m
- Weight: 195 kg
- Warhead:100 kg
- Caliber: 300 mm
- Length: 1800 mm
- Sink rate: 11.8 m/s
- Maximum depth: 450 m
