= ZIS-101 =

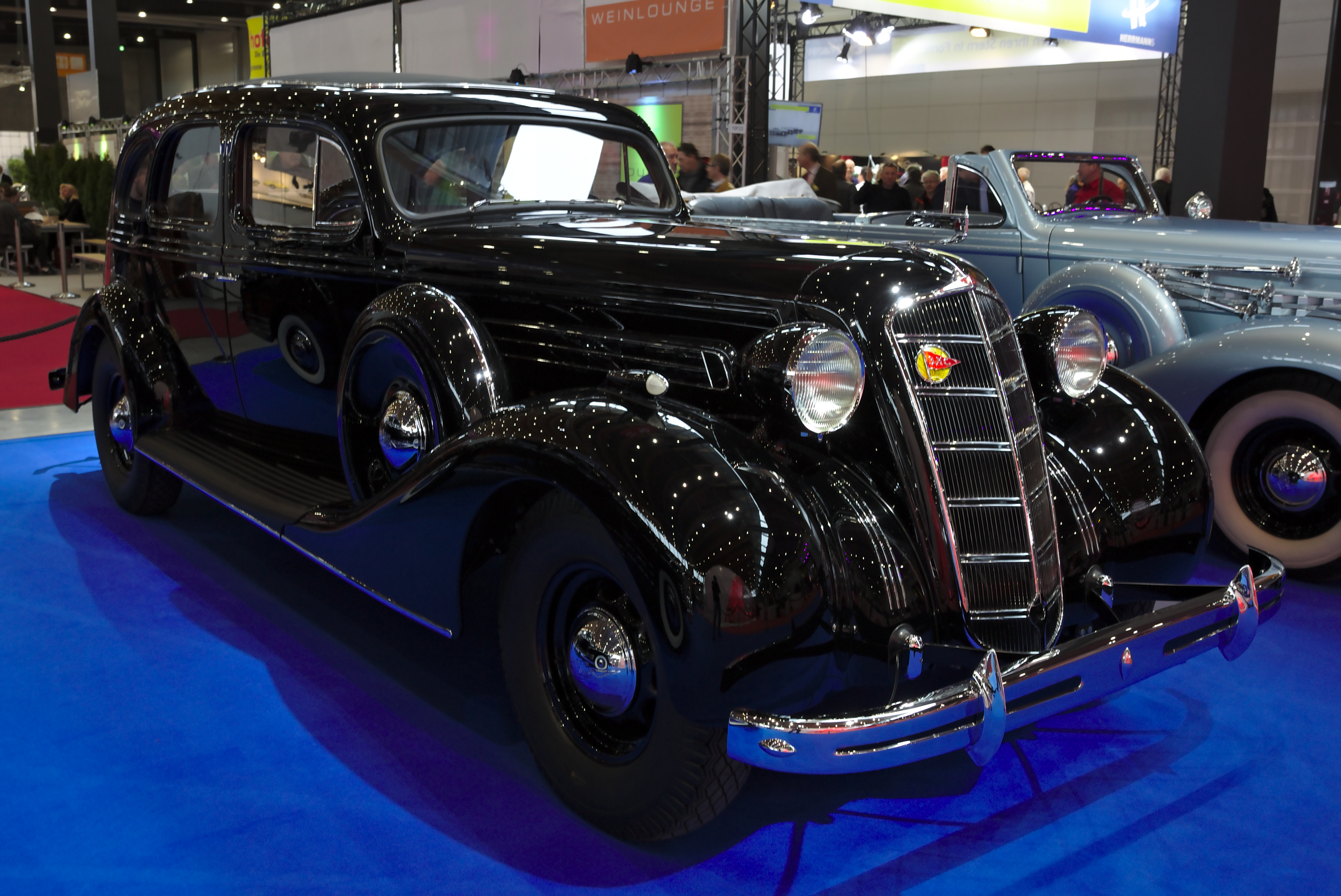

Overview
- Manufacturer: ZIS
- Production: 1936–1939 (ZIS-101); 1939–1941 (ZIS-101A)
- Assembly: Soviet Union: Moscow (Likhachov Plant)

Body and chassis
- Class: Limousine
- Body style: 4-door saloon (ZIS-101); 4-door convertible (ZIS-102)

Powertrain
- Engine: 5.8L ZIS-101 I8
- Transmission: 3-speed manual

Dimensions
- Wheelbase: 3,605 mm (141.9 in)
- Length: 5,750 mm (226.4 in)
- Width: 1,890 mm (74.4 in)
- Height: 1,870 mm (73.6 in)

Chronology
- Successor: ZIS-110

The ZIS-101 was a limousine produced by the Soviet car manufacturer Zavod Imeni Stalina from 1936 to 1941. Its chassis was reverse-engineered from a Buick 33-90, except for the front suspension, engine, exhaust and battery carried over from 1933 experimental limousine L-1, itself an unlicensed Buick 32-90 copy, but the body was designed by Budd Company for $1,500,000 while the stamps were made by Hamilton Foundry & Machine Company for another $500,000. It was equipped with an 5.76 L (351 cu in) straight-eight OHV engine (a metric copy of Buick 345) producing up to 110 PS (81 kW) and giving a top speed of 115 km/h (71 mph). The car was fitted with a 3-speed manual gearbox.

It was followed by the ZIS-101A that had improved the engine giving 116 PS (85 kW) and a new top speed of approximately 130 km/h (81 mph). Production ended in 1941 with over 8,000 cars built.

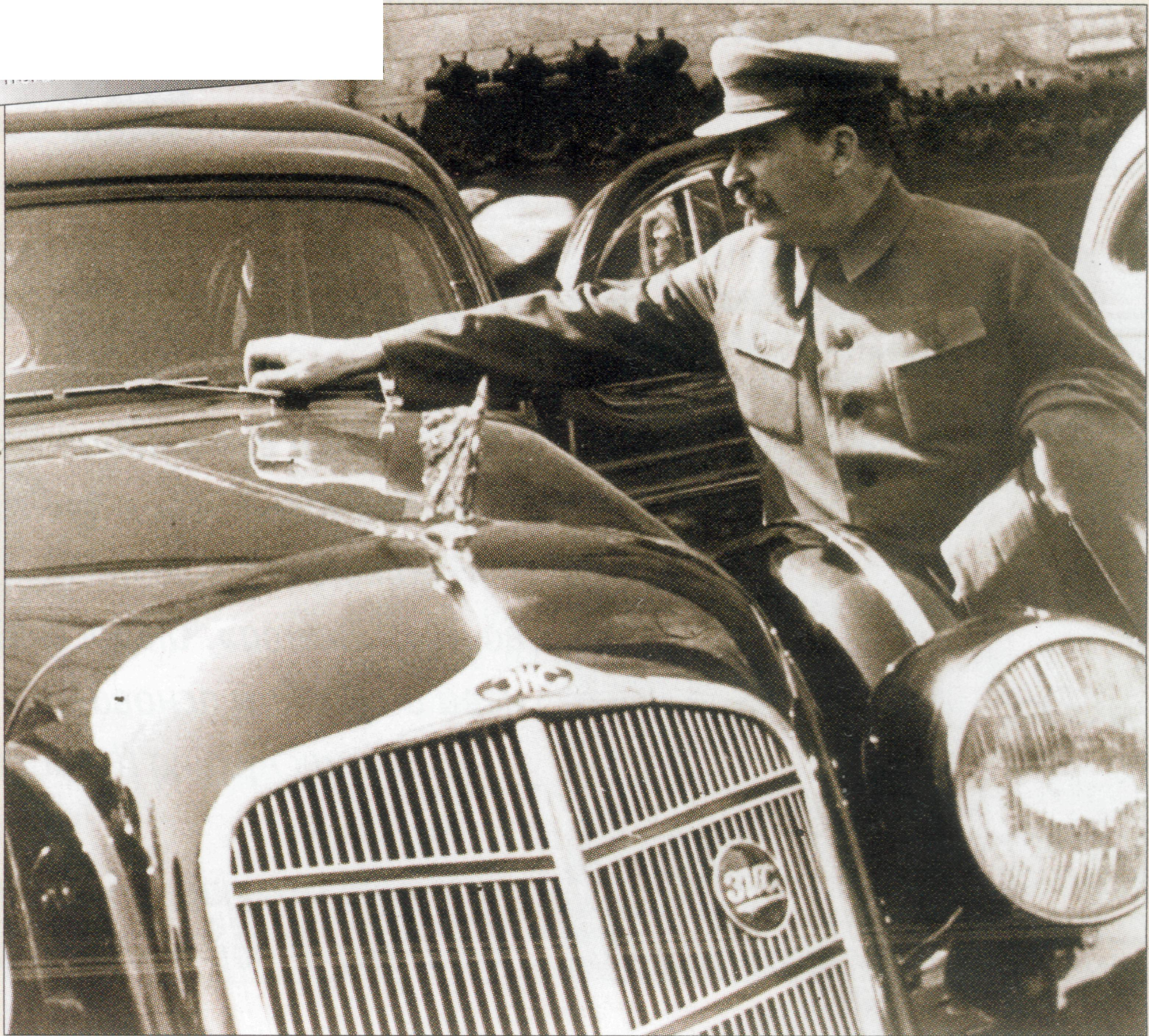
Stalin inspecting a ZIS-101, 1936

In 1939, a two-seat sport version designed by Valentin Nikolaevich Rostkov called 101-Sport was built. The engine was the same as in the 101-A, but boosted to 141 PS (104 kW) and a top speed of 162 km/h (101 mph) (although a Pravda article claimed 170–180 km/h). It was, however, not made in more than one or two copies.

== Variants ==
- ZIS-101: Initial production version. Produced 1936–1939.
- ZIS-101A: ZIS-101 with improved engine. Produced 1939–1941.
- ZIS-101B: Improved ZIS-101, prototype.
- ZIS-101E and ZIS-101S: Prototype armored versions.
- ZIS-101L: Prototype version with an intercom for communication between the passengers and driver.
- ZIS-101 Sanitary: Ambulance version.
- ZIS-101 Sport: Two-seat version. Produced in 1939.
- ZIS-102: Convertible version. Produced 1938–1940.
- ZIS-103: Prototype improved version of the ZIS-101.
- ZIS-105: Ambulance version based on ZIS-101A.
