= Soviet cruiser Molotov =

Soviet Navy's Kirov-class cruiser

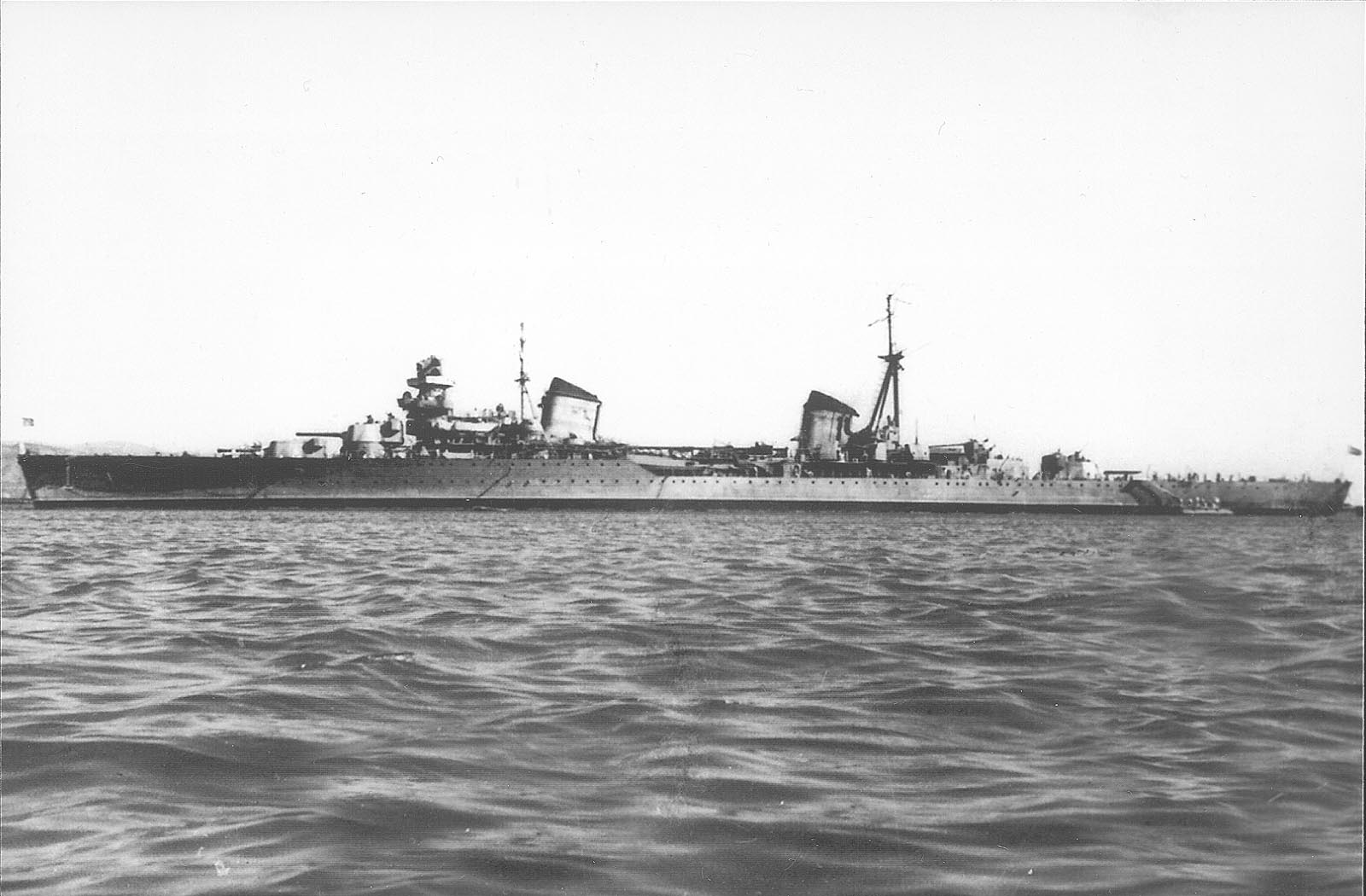
- Side view of Molotov

History

Soviet Union
- Name: Molotov
- Namesake: Vyacheslav Molotov
- Builder: Marti South, Nikolayev
- Laid down: 14 January 1937
- Launched: 4 December 1939
- Commissioned: 14 January 1941
- Renamed: Slava (Glory) 3 August 1957
- Reclassified: 3 August 1961, as training ship
- Refit: 1952–28 January 1955
- Fate: Sold for scrap, 4 April 1972

General characteristics (Project 26bis)
- Class & type: Kirov-class cruiser
- Displacement: 8,177 t (8,048 long tons) (standard); 9,728 t (9,574 long tons) (full load)
- Length: 191.4 m (627 ft 11 in)
- Beam: 17.66 m (57 ft 11 in)
- Draft: 6.3 m (20 ft 8 in) (full load)
- Installed power: 6 Yarrow-Normand boilers; 129,750 shp (96,750 kW)
- Propulsion: 2 shafts, 2 geared turbines
- Speed: 36.72 knots (68.01 km/h; 42.26 mph) (on trials)
- Endurance: 4,220 nmi (7,820 km; 4,860 mi) at 18 knots (33 km/h; 21 mph)
- Complement: 963
- Sensors & processing systems: Arktur hydrophone; Redut-K air-warning radar
- Armament: 3 × 3 - 180 mm (7.1 in) B-1-P guns; 6 × 1 - 100 mm (3.9 in) B-34 dual purpose guns; 9 × 1 - 45 mm (1.8 in) 21-K AA guns; 4 × 1 - 12.7 mm (0.5 in) DShK AA machine guns; 2 × 3 - 533 mm (21 in) torpedo tubes; 96–150 mines; 50 depth charges
- Armor: Waterline belt: 70 mm (2.8 in); Deck: 50 mm (2.0 in) each; Turrets: 70 mm (2.8 in); Barbettes: 70 mm (2.8 in); Conning tower: 150 mm (5.9 in)
- Aircraft carried: 2 × KOR-2 seaplanes
- Aviation facilities: 1 ZK-1 catapult

Molotov (Russian: Молотов) was a Project 26bis Kirov-class cruiser of the Soviet Navy that served during World War II and into the Cold War. She supported Soviet troops during the Siege of Sevastopol, the Kerch-Feodosiya Operation and the amphibious landings at Novorossiysk at the end of January 1943.

The ship was extensively modernized between 1952 and 1955. She was renamed Slava (Russian: Слава, Glory) in 1957 after Vyacheslav Molotov fell out of favour. Slava was reclassified as a training ship in 1961 before being sold for scrap in 1972.

== Description ==
Molotov and her sister Maxim Gorky had heavier armor and were slightly improved from the first two Kirov-class cruisers of Project 26, and were thus designated Project 26bis.

She was 187 meters (614 ft) long at the waterline, 191.4 meters (628 ft) long overall, with a beam of 17.66 meters (57 ft 11 in) and a draft between 5.87 to 6.3 meters (19 ft 3 in to 20 ft 8 in). She displaced 8,177 metric tons (8,048 long tons) at standard load and 9,728 metric tons (9,574 long tons) at full load.

Her steam turbines produced a total of 129,750 shaft horsepower (96,750 kW) during her sea trials, reaching a maximum speed of 36.72 knots (68.01 km/h; 42.26 mph), just shy of her designed speed of 37 knots, mainly because she was overweight by 900 metric tons (890 long tons). Molotov normally carried 650 metric tons (640 long tons) of fuel oil, 1,660 metric tons (1,630 long tons) at full load and 1,750 metric tons (1,720 long tons) at overload. This gave her a range of 4,220 nautical miles (7,820 km; 4,860 mi) at 18 knots (33 km/h; 21 mph).

Molotov carried nine 180-millimeter (7.1 in) 57-calibre B-1-P guns in three electrically powered MK-3-180 triple turrets. Her secondary armament consisted of three single 100-millimeter (3.9 in) 56-calibre B-34 anti-aircraft guns fitted on each side of the rear funnel. Her light AA guns consisted of nine semi-automatic 45-millimeter (1.8 in) 21-K AA guns and four DK 12.7-millimeter (0.50 in) machine guns. Six 533-millimeter (21 in) 39-Yu torpedo tubes were fitted in two triple mountings.

Molotov was the first Soviet ship to carry radar, a Redut-K air warning system, which she used for the entire war. Soviet-designed Mars-1 gunnery radar systems were added by 1944.

=== Wartime modifications ===
By 1943 three of Molotov's 45 mm semi-automatic guns were replaced with twelve fully automatic 37-millimeter (1.5 in) 70-K AA guns with one thousand rounds per gun and two extra DK machine guns. Her aircraft catapult was removed in 1942 to make room for more light AA guns.

In 1943 an improved ZK-1a catapult was fitted and successfully test-launched a Supermarine Spitfire fighter. However, in 1947 the concept was abandoned and the catapult was removed.

== World War II ==
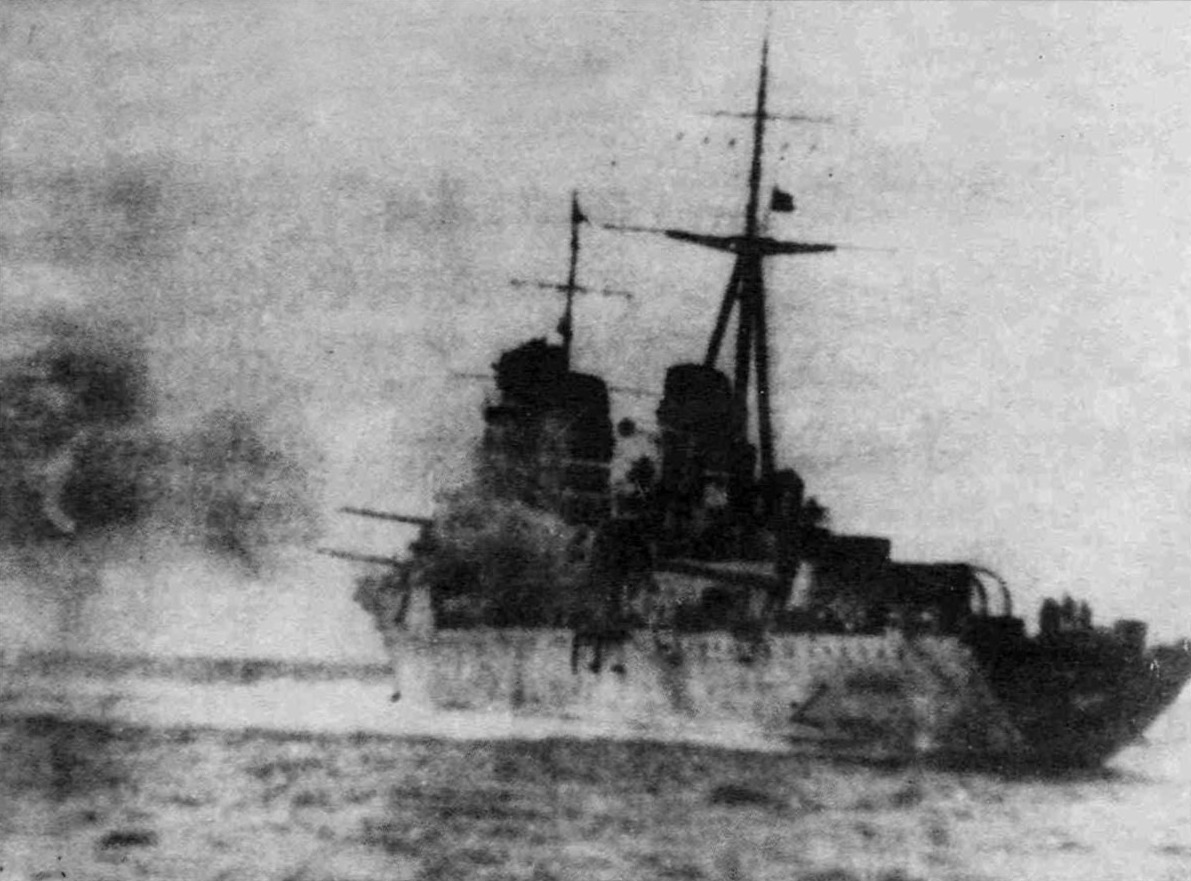
Molotov firing

Molotov was laid down at the Marti South, Nikolayev on 14 January 1937, launched on 4 December 1939 and was completed on 14 June 1941. As the only ship in the Soviet Navy with radar, Molotov remained in Sevastopol for the initial period of Operation Barbarossa to provide air warning. The advance of German troops into the Crimea in late October 1941 forced her to transfer to Tuapse where she continued to provide air warning. However, the ship did bombard German troops near Feodosiya with nearly 200 180 mm shells on 9 November before returning to Tuapse. Molotov helped to carry the 386th Rifle Division from Poti to Sevastopol between 24 and 28 December 1941. While off-loading troops on 29 December her stern was damaged by German artillery and she shelled Axis positions in retaliation, firing 205 180 mm and 107 100 mm shells. The ship evacuated 600 wounded upon her departure on 30 December.

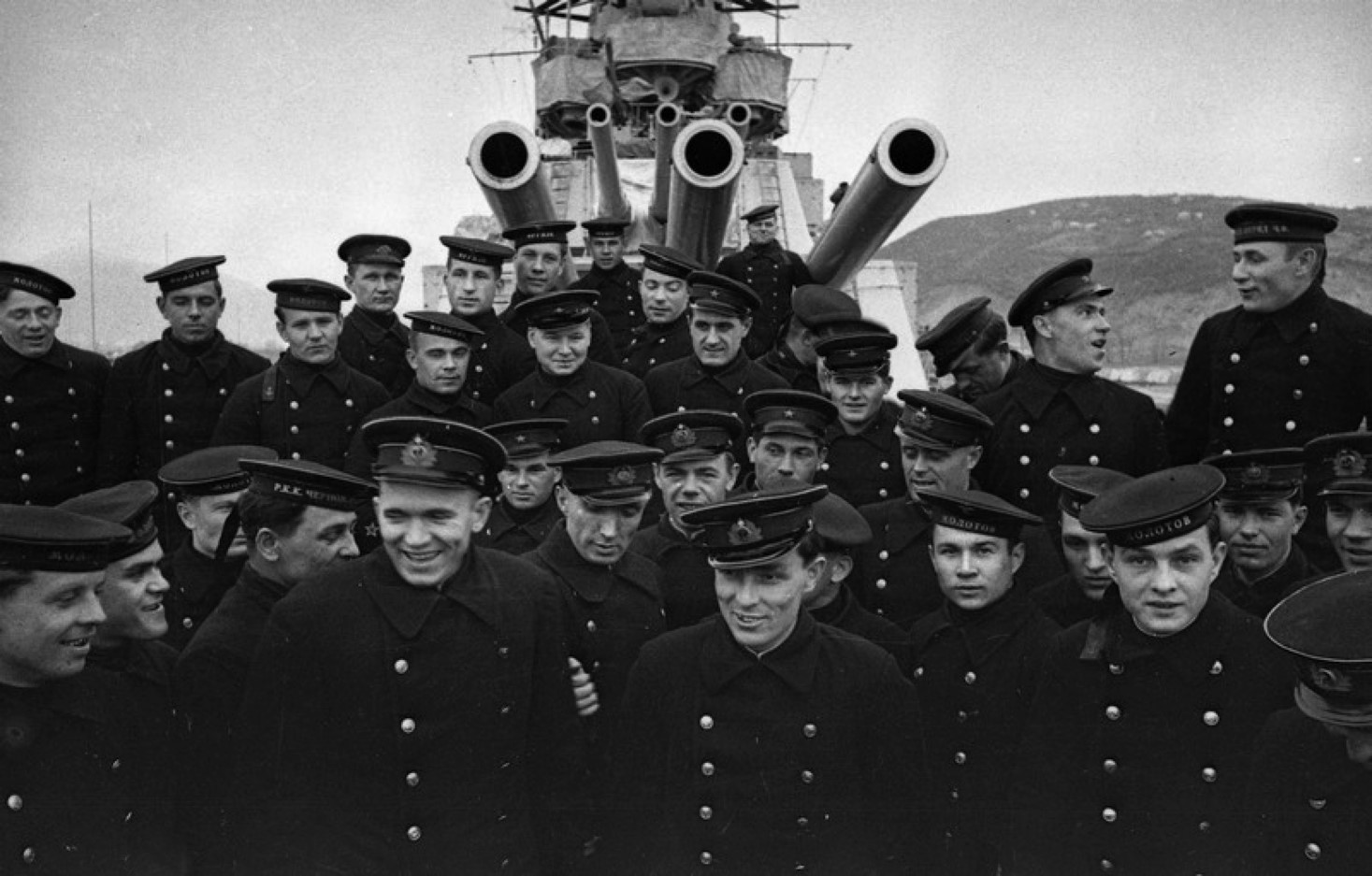
A gun crew of the Molotov that distinguished themselves in battle, 1942

Molotov reprised her role as a transport during the first week of January. Her bow was damaged during a heavy storm in Tuapse when she was thrown against the jetty on 21–22 January 1942. The ship spent most of the next month under repair, although her bow could not be straightened; the residual damage reduced her speed by several knots. She made a number of bombardment sorties in support of Soviet troops on the Kerch Peninsula until 20 March when she returned to Poti for more permanent repairs. On 12 June Molotov transported 2998 men of the 138th Rifle Brigade to Sevastopol, shelling German positions while unloading. She evacuated 1065 wounded and 350 women and children as she departed. On 14–15 June the ship returned, carrying 3855 reinforcements in company with other ships, bombarded German positions again, and evacuated 2908 wounded and refugees. On 2 August, while returning from another bombardment mission near Feodosiya, 20 metres (66 ft) of her stern was blown off by Heinkel He 111 torpedo bombers of 6./KG 26 acting in concert with Italian MAS motor torpedo boats. The damage reduced her speed to 10 knots (19 km/h; 12 mph) and Molotov had to be steered by her engines. Molotov was under repair at Poti until 31 July 1943 and used the stern of the incomplete Chapayev-class cruiser Frunze, the rudder of the incomplete cruiser Zheleznyakov, the steering gear from the cruiser Kaganovich and the steering sensor from the submarine L-25. The loss of three destroyers to German air attack on 6 October 1943 resulted in Stalin's order that forbade the deployment of large naval units without his express permission; this meant the end of Molotov's active participation in the war.

== Postwar career ==
Molotov was refitted in November 1945 to repair the last of her wartime damage. She suffered a fire in the shell handling room for Turret #2 on 5 October 1946 that had to be extinguished by flooding the magazine and handling room at the cost of 22 dead and 20 wounded. The ship served as the test bed for the radars intended for the Chapayev and Sverdlov-class cruisers during the late 1940s. Molotov's postwar modernization began in 1952 and lasted until 28 January 1955.

As part of this modernization Molotov received a radar suite composed of Gyuys for air search, Rif for surface search, Zalp for main-armament gunnery and Yakor' for anti-aircraft gunnery. All of her light anti-aircraft guns were replaced by eleven twin gun water-cooled 37 mm V-11 mounts and her 100 mm guns were reinstalled on fully powered B-34USMA mountings. Her anti-aircraft fire-control system was replaced by a Zenit-26 with SPN-500 stabilized directors. In addition she lost her torpedo tubes, anti-submarine weapons, boat cranes and all remaining aircraft equipment. This cost 200 million rubles, between half and three-quarters the cost of a new Project 68bis Sverdlov-class cruiser.

On 29 October 1955 the ship participated in rescue efforts after an explosion sank the ex-Italian battleship Novorossiysk. Five of her own men were lost when the battleship capsized almost three hours after the explosion. She was renamed Slava on 3 August 1957 after Vyacheslav Molotov was purged from the government after an unsuccessful coup against Nikita Khrushchev that same year. (Note: Vyacheslav Molotov joked: "Firstly the cruiser was named on my family name, now she is named on my first name". ("Slava" means in Russian not only glory, but also is a diminutive of Vyacheslav.)) She was reclassified as a training cruiser on 3 August 1961. Slava was deployed to the Mediterranean between 5–30 June 1967 to show Soviet support of Syria during the Six-Day War. She returned to the Mediterranean between September and December 1970, where the ship assisted the Kotlin-class destroyer Bravyi after the latter's collision with the aircraft carrier HMS Ark Royal on 9 November 1970. Slava was sold for scrap on 4 April 1972.
