= Soviet cruiser Kalinin =

Soviet Navy's Kirov-class cruiser

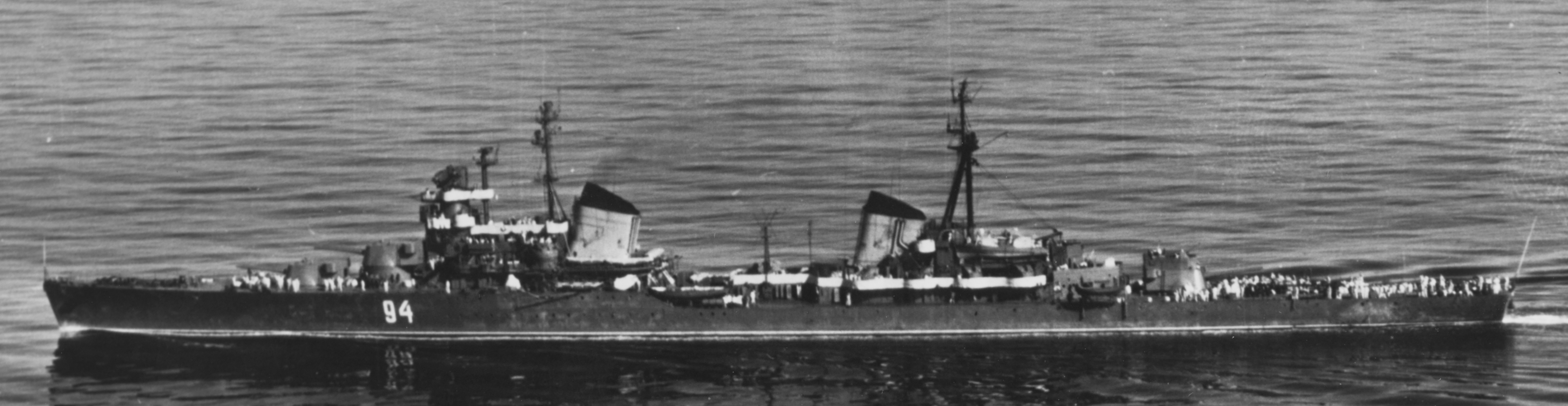
- Sister ship Petropavlovsk in 1958

History

Soviet Union
- Name: Kalinin (Калинин)
- Namesake: Mikhail Kalinin
- Builder: Shipyard 199, Komsomolsk-on-Amur
- Yard number: 7
- Laid down: 12 August 1938
- Launched: 8 May 1942
- Completed: 31 December 1942
- In service: 31 January 1953
- Out of service: 1 May 1956
- Renamed: PKZ-21, 14 March 1960
- Reclassified: 6 February 1960 as floating barracks
- Stricken: 12 April 1963
- Reinstated: 1 December 1957
- Fate: Transferred for scrapping, 10 August 1963

General characteristics (Project 26bis2)
- Class & type: Kirov-class cruiser
- Displacement: 8,400 t (8,267 long tons) (standard); 10,040 t (9,881 long tons) (full load)
- Length: 191.2 m (627 ft 4 in)
- Beam: 17.66 m (57 ft 11 in)
- Draught: 6.3 m (20 ft 8 in) (full load)
- Installed power: 6 Yarrow-Normand boilers; 126,900 shp (94,629 kW)
- Propulsion: 2 shafts; 2 geared steam turbines
- Speed: 36 knots (67 km/h; 41 mph)
- Endurance: 5,590 nmi (10,350 km; 6,430 mi) at 18 knots (33 km/h; 21 mph)
- Complement: 812
- Sensors & processing systems: ASDIC-132 and Mars-72 sonars
- Armament: 3 × triple 180 mm (7.1 in) guns; 8 × single 76 mm (3 in) AA guns; 6 × single 45 mm (1.8 in) AA guns; 10 × single 37 mm (1.5 in) AA guns; 6 × single 12.7 mm (0.5 in) AA machine guns; 2 × triple 533 mm (21 in) torpedo tubes; 100–164 mines; 50 depth charges
- Armor: Waterline belt: 70 mm (2.8 in); Deck: 50 mm (2 in) each; Turrets: 70 mm (2.8 in); Barbettes: 70 mm (2.8 in); Conning tower: 150 mm (5.9 in)

Kalinin (Калинин) was one of six Kirov-class cruisers (officially known as Project 26) built for the Soviet Navy in the Russian Far East from components shipped from European Russia during World War II. The ship was one of the last pair constructed, known as the Project 26bis2 subclass. Completed at the end of 1942 and assigned to the Pacific Fleet, she saw no action during the Soviet–Japanese War in 1945 and served into the Cold War. Sometimes serving as a flagship, her post-war career was uneventful until she was disarmed and converted into a floating barracks in 1960. She was scrapped in the early 1960s.

== Description ==
The design of the Kirovs was derived from the Italian Duca d'Aosta-class light cruisers, modified to suit their more powerful armament. The two Project 26bis2 ships were slightly larger than the earlier Project 26 and 26bis ships and were fitted with a different anti-aircraft armament. Kalinin was 187 m (613 ft 6 in) long at the waterline, and 191.2 m (627 ft 4 in) long overall. She had a beam of 17.66 m (57 ft 11 in) and had a draught between 5.88 and 6.3 m (19 ft 3 in and 20 ft 8 in). The ship displaced 8,400 metric tons (8,267 long tons) at standard load and 10,040 t (9,881 long tons) at full load. Her crew numbered 812 officers and men during wartime.

The Kirov-class ships were powered by two sets of TV-7 geared steam turbines, each driving a single propeller shaft using steam provided by six Yarrow-Normand boilers. The turbines were designed to produce 110,000 shaft horsepower (82,000 kW) which was intended to give the ships a speed of 37 knots (69 km/h; 43 mph). On her sea trials, Kalinin only reached 36 knots (67 km/h; 41 mph) from 126,900 shp (94,629 kW). Without overload power, she was only capable of 32.5 knots (60.2 km/h; 37.4 mph) in 1945. The Kirovs carried enough fuel oil to give them an endurance of 5,590 nautical miles (10,350 km; 6,430 mi) at 18 knots (33 km/h; 21 mph).

=== Armament, protection and sensors ===
The main battery of the Kirov class consisted of nine 180-millimeter (7.1 in) B-1-P guns in three triple-gun turrets, a superfiring pair forward of the superstructure and one aft. Unlike her earlier half-sisters built in European Russia, her secondary armament initially consisted of eight single 76.2-millimeter (3 in) 34-K anti-aircraft (AA) guns mounted on each side of the rear funnel because the 100-millimeter (3.9 in) B-34 guns originally intended to be used had run into production problems. The 34-K guns were a stop-gap until the Army 85-millimeter (3.3 in) 52-K AA gun could be mated with the mount of the 34-K and put into production as the 90-K. They replaced the 34-K guns in May 1943. Light AA guns initially consisted of six semi-automatic 45-millimeter (1.8 in) 21-K AA guns, ten fully automatic 37-millimeter (1.5 in) 70-K AA guns, and six 12.7-millimeter (0.5 in) machine guns, but were significantly increased during the war. By 1945 Kalinin had exchanged her 21-K guns for nine additional 70-K guns, of which four were mounted on turret roofs and the others in the superstructure. By 1957 her light anti-aircraft armament consisted of only nine powered twin-gun 37 mm V-11 mounts. Six 533-millimeter (21 in) 39-Yu torpedo tubes were fitted in two triple mountings, one on each broadside. The cruiser could mount rails to carry between 100 and 164 mines and racks for fifty depth charges, but by 1945, she could carry 100–106 mines and she had been fitted with two or four throwers for her 66 depth charges.

The Project 26bis and the Project 26bis2 cruisers shared the same armor configuration: the waterline belt, turret, and barbette armor were all 70 millimeters (2.8 in) thick. The deck was protected by 50-millimeter (2 in) armor plates, while those of the conning tower were 150 millimeters (5.9 in) thick.

Initially built without a sonar, Kalinin received the Lend-Lease ASDIC-132 system, which the Soviets called Drakon-132, as well as the experimental Soviet Mars-72 system by 1945. As built she lacked any radars, but by 1944 she was equipped with British and American Lend-Lease radars as well as Soviet-designed systems. A British Type 291 and an American SG radar were used for air search. A pair of Soviet Yupiter-1 radars were used for main-battery fire control while anti-aircraft fire control was provided by two British Type 282 radars. She was planned to be equipped with a single ZK-2b catapult on the centerline between her funnels with capacity for two Beriev KOR-2 seaplanes, but was completed without the catapult, which could not be shipped from besieged Leningrad in time. In place of the catapult, six 70-K guns were added. The catapult was later installed, with Kalinin conducting sea trials with the catapult and the KOR-2 in 1945. The catapult was removed in October 1947 as radar had superseded the use of aircraft to correct the ship's gunfire.

== Service ==
Kalinin was one of two Project 26bis2 cruisers, the third pair of the Kirov-class cruisers. She was assembled at the newly constructed Shipyard No. 199, Komsomolsk-on-Amur, as yard number 7, from components built at Shipyard No. 189 in Leningrad. She was laid down on 12 August 1938, launched from drydock on 8 May 1942 and towed down the Amur River to Vladivostok for completion. Her construction was prolonged by late deliveries from factories in European Russia and the poorly built drydock. For example, her propellers had to be shipped from Leningrad after it had been surrounded by the Germans and her propeller shafts had to be transported from the Barrikady factory in Stalingrad in 1942 before it was destroyed by the Germans. The cruiser joined the Pacific Fleet on 31 December after completing her sea trials, and officially entered service exactly a month later when the Soviet naval jack was raised aboard her. Upon her entry into service, Kalinin became the flagship of the Detachment of Light Forces of the Pacific Fleet. She conducted combat training in Ussuri Bay, screened by minesweepers, subchasers, and torpedo boats, in addition to air cover provided by anti-submarine aircraft.

She was ordered to prepare for transfer to the Soviet Northern Fleet together with the destroyer Revnostny via the Northern Sea Route on 24 April 1943 due to the Soviet belief that the Northern Fleet was weaker than its German opponents. She was scheduled for departure on 25 June. During May, extensive preparations were made for the voyage at Shipyard No. 202, which included the installation of special propellers with removable blades and the strengthening of her hull to withstand ice pressure. After the transfer was canceled without explanation on 1 June, Kalinin was removed from drydock, although the alterations remained in place until May 1944. She was under repair during the Soviet invasion of Manchuria in 1945, not having been slated for inclusion in the operation.

Kalinin was declared the best ship in the Pacific Fleet for her training performance during 1946, winning four prizes. The cruiser became part of the 5th Fleet between 17 January 1947 and 23 May 1953 when the Pacific Fleet was temporarily split. She went to sea in 1951 for gunnery testing under the flag of the 5th Fleet commander, Yury Panteleyev, with the commander-in-chief of the forces in the Far East, Marshal Rodion Malinovsky, and the Primorsky Military District commander, General Sergey Biryuzov observing the firing. Kalinin hosted Malinovsky, Nikita Khrushchev, Anastas Mikoyan, Nikolai Bulganin, and Admiral Nikolai Kuznetsov during their visit to the Pacific Fleet in October 1954 and demonstrated her main guns while they were aboard. She spent the post-war period on routine training missions until she was mothballed at Vladivostok on 7 May 1956. Kalinin was reactivated on 1 December 1957 before being disarmed and converted into a floating barracks on 6 February 1960, being renamed PKZ-21 on 14 March of that year. She was struck from the fleet on 12 April 1963, before being transferred to Sovetskaya Gavan for scrapping on 10 August.
