= Kronshtadt-class battlecruiser =

Planned class of Soviet battlecruisers

- Side view as the design appeared in early 1939

Class overview
- Builders: Shipyard No. 194, Marti, Leningrad; Shipyard No. 200, 61 Communards, Nikolayev
- Operators: Soviet Navy
- Preceded by: Borodino class (planned)
- Succeeded by: Stalingrad class (planned)
- Built: 1939–1941
- Planned: 2–3
- Completed: 0
- Canceled: 2

General characteristics (Project 69-I)
- Type: Battlecruiser
- Displacement: 39,660 t (39,034 long tons) (standard)
- Length: 250.5 m (821 ft 10 in) (o/a)
- Beam: 31.6 m (103 ft 8 in)
- Draft: 9.7 m (31 ft 10 in) (full load)
- Installed power: 12 water-tube boilers; 210,000 shp (156,597 kW)
- Propulsion: 3 shafts; 3 steam turbines
- Speed: 32 knots (59 km/h; 37 mph)
- Range: 8,300 nmi (15,372 km; 9,551 mi) at 14.5 knots (26.9 km/h; 16.7 mph)
- Complement: 1,819
- Armament: 3 × twin 38 cm (15 in) guns; 4 × twin 152 mm (6 in) guns; 4 × twin 100 mm (3.9 in) DP guns; 6 × quadruple 37 mm (1.5 in) AA guns
- Armor: Waterline belt: 230 mm (9.1 in); Main Deck: 90 mm (3.5 in); Lower Deck: 30 mm (1.2 in); Turrets: 305 mm (12 in); Barbettes: 330 mm (13 in); Conning tower: 330 mm; Bulkheads: 275–330 mm (10.8–13.0 in)
- Aircraft carried: 2 Beriev KOR-2 seaplanes
- Aviation facilities: 1 catapult

The Kronshtadt-class battlecruisers, with the Soviet designation as Project 69 heavy cruisers ("Тяжёлые крейсера проекта 69"), were ordered for the Soviet Navy in the late 1930s. Two ships were started but none were completed due to World War II. These ships had a complex and prolonged design process which was hampered by constantly changing requirements and the Great Purge in 1937.

They were laid down in 1939, with an estimated completion date in 1944, but Stalin's naval construction program was more ambitious than the shipbuilding and armaments industries could handle. Prototypes of the armament and machinery had not even been completed by 22 June 1941, almost two years after the start of construction. This is why the Soviets bought twelve surplus 38-centimeter (15.0 in) SK C/34 guns, and their twin turrets, similar to those used in the Bismarck-class battleships, from Germany in 1940. The ships were partially redesigned to accommodate them, after construction had already begun, but no turrets were actually delivered before Germany invaded the following year.

Only Kronshtadt's hull survived the war reasonably intact being 10% complete in 1945, although she was considered to be obsolete. The Soviets considered converting her into an aircraft carrier, but the idea was rejected and both hulls were scrapped in 1947.

== Design ==
The Kronshtadt-class battlecruisers had their origin in a mid-1930s requirement for a large cruiser (Russian: bol'shoi kreiser) capable of destroying 10,000-long-ton (10,160 t) cruisers built to the limits imposed by the Washington Naval Treaty, of which the Soviets were not a signatory. Several designs were submitted by the end of 1935, but the Navy was not satisfied and rejected all of them. It asked for another design, displacing 23,000 metric tons (22,637 long tons) and armed with 254-millimeter (10.0 in) guns, in early 1936, eventually designated Project 22, but this design was cancelled after the Soviets began negotiations in mid-1936 with the British that ultimately resulted in the Anglo-Soviet Quantitative Naval Agreement of 1937 and agreed to follow the terms of the Second London Naval Treaty which limited battleships to a displacement of 35,000 long tons (35,562 t). The Soviets had been working on a small battleship design (Battleship 'B') for service in the Baltic and Black Seas and had to shrink it as a result of these discussions to a size close to that of the Project 22 large cruiser so that the latter was cancelled. Battleship 'B' was redesignated as Project 25 and given the task of destroying Treaty cruisers and German pocket battleships. The Project 25 design was accepted in mid-1937 after major revisions in the armor scheme and the machinery layout and four were ordered with construction to begin in late 1937 and early 1938. However, this decision occurred right before the Great Purge began to hit the Navy in August 1937 and two of the ship's designers were arrested and executed within a year. The Project 25 design was then rejected on the grounds that it was too weak compared to foreign ships and the whole program was cancelled in early 1938 after an attempt to modify the design with larger guns had been made.

However the Soviet Navy still felt a need for a fast ship that could deal with enemy cruisers and the original concept was revived as Project 69. They wanted a ship not to exceed 23,000 metric tons with a speed of 34 knots (63 km/h; 39 mph) and an armament of nine 254 mm guns, but the requirement proved to be too ambitious for the specified size and it increased to 26,200 metric tons (25,786 long tons) in the design submitted in June 1938. By this time, however, details were becoming available for the Scharnhorst-class battleships and the ship was deemed inferior to the German ships. The State Defense Committee revised the requirements and specified a size about 31,000 metric tons (30,510 long tons), an armament of nine 305-millimeter (12.0 in) guns, an armor belt 250 mm (9.8 in) thick and a speed about 31–32 knots (57–59 km/h; 36–37 mph). A revised design was finished by October which was wargamed against the Japanese Kongō-class battlecruisers, the French Dunkerque-class battleships as well as the Scharnhorst class. It was deemed superior to the Kongos at medium range and inferior to the Dunkerques at the same range, but generally superior to the Scharnhorsts, although it is doubtful that the Soviets were fully aware of the true specifications of the Kongōs as rebuilt or of the Scharnhorsts as the displacement of the latter had been given as 26,000 metric tons (25,589 long tons), more than 5,000 metric tons (4,921 long tons) short of their true displacement. The Navy's Shipbuilding Administration thought that the original secondary armament of 130-millimeter (5.1 in) guns was too small and that the armor on the turrets, conning tower and the forward transverse bulkhead was too thin. A revised, 35,000-ton design with 152-millimeter (6.0 in) guns and extra armor was submitted to the State Defense Council in January 1939.

This was approved and the detailed design work began with the basic concept that the ship should be superior to the Scharnhorst-class ships and able to outrun the Bismarck-class battleships. At this time the horizontal protection was revised after full-scale trials revealed that a 500-kilogram (1,100 lb) bomb would penetrate both a 40-millimeter (1.6 in) upper deck and a 50-millimeter (2.0 in) middle deck to burst on the main armor deck. So the middle deck was thickened to 90-millimeter (3.5 in) with the lower deck intended to catch any splinters penetrating the armor deck. This meant that the main belt had to be extended upwards to meet the main armor deck at a significant penalty in weight. The Defense Committee approved the sketch design on 13 July 1939, but the detailed design was not approved until 12 April 1940, after construction had already begun on the first two ships.

It was already apparent that the 305 mm guns and turrets were well behind schedule when Joseph Stalin asked the German representatives in Moscow on 8 February 1940 to negotiate a trade agreement if it would be possible to use the triple 283-millimeter (11.1 in) turrets in lieu of the triple 305 mm turrets of the Project 69 ships. They replied that the turrets were out of production, but new ones could be built. He then asked if twin 380-millimeter (15.0 in) turrets could be used instead. The Germans said that they would have to check back for the technical details. Krupp had six incomplete turrets on hand that had originally been ordered before the war to rearm the Scharnhorst-class battleships, but they were cancelled after the start of World War II when the Germans decided that they could not afford to have the ships out of service during the war. A preliminary purchase agreement was made to buy twelve guns and six turrets later that month, well before any studies were even made to see if the substitution was even possible. The Shipbuilding Commissariat reported on 17 April that it was possible so the agreement was finalized in November 1940 with the deliveries scheduled from October 1941 to 28 March 1943. The order also included 10-meter (33 ft) rangefinders and 150-centimeter (59 in) searchlights.

The Soviets never did get the detailed data required to redesign the ship's barbettes and magazines, but they did know that the 380-mm barbettes were bigger in diameter than that of the 305 mm turret as well as being taller than the Russian turrets. So the barbette of turret number two had to be raised to clear turret number one and the height of the conning tower had to be raised to clear turret number two. Similarly the 37-millimeter (1.5 in) anti-aircraft guns behind turret number three had to be raised as well. The new turrets required more electrical power which meant that the output of the turbo generators had to be increased to 1,300 kilowatts. All of these changes added over 1,000 metric tons (984 long tons) to the ships' displacement and the sketch design was completed by 16 October 1940, as Project 69-I (Importnyi—Imported), even though they still lacked data for the turrets and their barbettes. This was presented to the State Defense Committee on 11 February 1941, but the design was not approved until 10 April when it ordered that the first two ships be completed with German guns while the others would continue to use the 305 mm guns. The detailed design was supposed to be completed by 15 October 1941, but it was rendered pointless when the Germans invaded the Soviet Union in June.

=== General characteristics ===
The Project 69-class ships were 250.5 meters (821 ft 10 in) long overall and had a waterline length of 240 meters (787 ft 5 in). They had a beam of 31.6 meters (103 ft 8 in) and at full load a draft of 9.45 meters (31 ft 0 in). As designed they displaced 35,240 metric tons (34,683 long tons) at standard and 41,539 metric tons (40,883 long tons) at full load. The displacement of the two Project 69-I-class ships increased to 36,250 metric tons (35,677 long tons) at standard load and 42,831 metric tons (42,155 long tons) at full load which increased the draft to 9.7 meters (31 ft 10 in) at full load while the waterline length grew to 242.1 meters (794 ft 3 in) simply because the extra draft submerged more of the sharply raked stem and spoon-shaped stern. The speed remained the same as the deeper draft was offset by a more efficient propeller form.

The hull form was very full with a block coefficient of 0.61 which compared badly to the 0.54 of the Dunkerque, the 0.52 of the German O-class battlecruiser or the 0.5266 of the American Alaska-class cruiser. This meant that a lot of horsepower was necessary to achieve even modest speeds. Stalin's decision that the Project 69 ships would use three shafts increased the shaft loading and reduced propulsive efficiency, although it did shorten the length of the armored citadel and thus overall displacement. The riveted hull was subdivided by 24 transverse bulkheads and used longitudinal framing in the citadel, but transverse framing for the structure fore and aft of the citadel. The metacentric height was 2.8 meters (9 ft 2 in) for the 305 mm gunned ships, but dropped to 2.58 meters (8 ft 6 in) in the 380 mm gunned ships. The tactical diameter was estimated at about 1,200 meters (1,312 yd).

The Kronshtadt-class ships were provided with two KOR-2 flying boats which would be launched by the catapult mounted between the funnels.

=== Propulsion ===
The power plant was laid out on a unit system. The forward boiler room contained eight boilers and was followed by an engine room for the two wing propeller shafts. The second boiler room contained four boilers and was followed by a turbine room for the central shaft. The single-reduction, impulse-reduction geared steam turbines were an imported Brown Boveri design shared with the Sovetsky Soyuz-class battleship, but the factory in Kharkiv that was to build them never finished a single turbine before the Germans invaded. They produced a total of 210,000 shp (156,597 kW). Twelve 7u-bis water-tube boilers worked at a pressure of 37 kg/cm^{2} (3,628 kPa; 526 psi) and temperature of 380 °C (716 °F). There were two other small boilers for harbor service and to power the auxiliary machinery. The electrical plant originally consisted of four 1200 kW turbo generators and four 650 kW diesel generators, but these were upgraded for the Project 69-I ships.

Maximum speed was estimated at 31 knots (57 km/h; 36 mph), using the revised propeller design, although forcing the machinery would yield an extra knot. The normal fuel oil capacity was 2,920 metric tons (2,874 long tons), which provided an estimated endurance of 1,100 nautical miles (2,000 km; 1,300 mi) at full speed. Maximum fuel capacity was 5,570 metric tons (5,482 long tons) which gave a range of 8,300 nautical miles (15,370 km; 9,550 mi) at 14.5 knots (26.9 km/h; 16.7 mph) and 6,900 nmi (12,780 km; 7,940 mi) at 16.5 knots (30.6 km/h; 19.0 mph).

=== Armament ===
The main armament was initially going to consist of three electrically powered triple-gun turrets, each with three 54-caliber 305 mm B-50 guns. The turrets were based on the MK-2 turrets planned for the Project 25 large cruiser. The guns could be depressed to −3° and elevated to 45°. They had a fixed loading angle of 6° and their rate of fire varied with the time required to relay the gun. It ranged from 2.36 to 3.24 rounds per minute depending on the elevation. The turrets could elevate at a rate of 10 degrees per second and traverse at 5.1 degrees per second. 100 rounds per gun were carried. The gun fired 470-kilogram (1,040 lb) armor-piercing projectiles at a muzzle velocity of 900 m/s (3,000 ft/s); this provided a maximum range of 47,580 meters (52,030 yd).

The secondary armament consisted of eight 57-caliber B-38 152 mm guns mounted in four twin-gun turrets concentrated at the forward end of the superstructure. The forward turrets were inboard and above the outer turrets which provided both turrets with good arcs of fire. Their elevation limits were -5° to +45° with a fixed loading angle of 8°. Their rate of fire also varied with the elevation from 7.5 to 4.8 rounds per minute. The turrets could elevate at a rate of 13 degrees per second and traverse at 6 degrees per second. They had a maximum range of 30,085 meters (32,901 yd) with a 50-kilogram (110 lb) shell at a muzzle velocity of 915 m/s (3,000 ft/s).

Heavy anti-aircraft (AA) fire was provided by eight 56-caliber 100 mm B-34 dual-purpose guns in four twin turrets mounted at the aft end of the superstructure with the aft turrets mounted inboard of the forward turrets. They could elevate to a maximum of 85° and depress to -8°. They could traverse at a rate of 12° per second and elevate at 10° per second. They fired 15.6-kilogram (34 lb) high explosive shells at a muzzle velocity of 900 m/s (3,000 ft/s); this provided a maximum range of 22,400 meters (24,500 yd) against surface targets, but their maximum ceiling against aerial targets was 15,000 meters (49,000 ft).

Light AA defense was handled by six quadruple, water-cooled mounts fitted with 37 mm (1.5 in) 70-K guns. Two mounts were abreast the forward funnel, two just abaft the rear funnel and the last two on the centerline of the aft superstructure superfiring over the rear main-gun turret. Initially seven mounts were planned, but the one above the conning tower was exchanged for a director for the 100 mm guns in early 1940 when the Navy realized that the other directors were blocked by the superstructure. The guns fired .732-kilogram (1.61 lb) shells at a muzzle velocity of 880 m/s (2,887 ft/s). Their maximum range was 8,000 meters (26,247 ft).

The Germans sold the Soviets twelve 52-caliber 38-centimeter (15.0 in) SKC/34 guns and their associated Drh LC/34 turrets as part of the Molotov–Ribbentrop Pact. Their elevation range was -5.5° to +30° with a fixed loading angle of 2.5°. Their rate of fire was 2.3 rounds per minute. The guns had a maximum range of 35,550 meters (38,880 yd) with an 800-kilogram (1,800 lb) shell at a muzzle velocity of 820 m/s (2,700 ft/s).

=== Fire control ===
Two KDP-8-III fire-control directors were used to control the main armament. These had two 8-meter (26 ft 3 in) stereoscopic rangefinders, one to track the target and the other to measure the range to the ship's own shell splashes. Two of these were protected by 20 mm (0.79 in) of armor and were mounted atop the rear superstructure and the tower-mast. Two KDP-4t-II directors, with two 4-meter (13 ft 1 in) rangefinders each, controlled the secondary armament. The dual-purpose guns were controlled by two, later three, stabilized directors, each with a 3-meter (9 ft 10 in) rangefinder.

=== Protection ===
The ships had relatively light armor. The main belt was 230 millimeters (9.1 in) thick, with a taper to the lower edge, and inclined outwards six degrees. It was 5 meters (16 ft 5 in) high of which 1.6 meters (5 ft 3 in) was intended to be submerged as originally designed. The belt was 185 meters (606 ft 11 in) long and covered 76.8 percent of the waterline; forward of this was a 20 mm belt that extended all the way to the bow. The forward transverse 330-millimeter (13.0 in) bulkhead was 330 mm thick while the rear bulkhead was 275 millimeters (10.8 in) thick. The upper deck was only 14 millimeters (0.55 in) thick and was intended to initiate shell and bomb fuzes. The main armor deck, which was even with the top of the waterline belt, was 90 millimeters (3.5 in) thick and a 30-millimeter (1.2 in) splinter deck was underneath it, although it tapered to 15 millimeters (0.59 in) in thickness over the torpedo protection system. The underwater protection was an American-style design with a bulge and four longitudinal bulkheads intended to withstand a 500-kilogram (1,102 lb) warhead of TNT. It covered 61.5% of the ship's length and had a total depth of 6 meters (19 ft 8 in), that reduced to 4 meters (13 ft 1 in) forward and aft where the hull lines became finer.

The main turrets had 305 mm faces and backs and 125-millimeter (4.9 in) sides and roofs. Their barbettes were protected with 330 mm of armor. The secondary turrets had 100 mm faces with 50-millimeter (2.0 in) sides and roofs and 75-millimeter (3.0 in) barbettes. The dual-purpose mountings had 50 mm armor with 40-millimeter (1.6 in) barbettes. The conning tower had 330 mm sides and a 125 mm roof with a 230 mm communications tube running down to the armor deck. The admiral's bridge was protected with 50 mm armor. Each of the directors had 14 mm of armor as did the 37 mm gun mounts. The funnels had 20 mm armor for their entire height above the deck and a 50 mm box protected the smoke generators.

== Construction ==
Luftwaffe reconnaissance photo of Kronshtadt under construction in late 1941; her stern section is in the right midsection of the photograph

The Soviet shipbuilding and related industries proved to be incapable of supporting the construction of the four Sovetsky Soyuz-class battleships as well as the two Kronshtadt-class battlecruisers at the same time. The largest warships built in the Soviet Union prior to 1938 were the 8,000-metric-ton (7,874-long-ton) Kirov-class cruisers and even they had suffered from a number of production problems, but the Soviet leadership preferred to ignore the industrial difficulties when making their plans. The shipyards in Leningrad and Nikolayev had less than half the workers intended. Shipbuilding steel proved to be in short supply in 1939–1940 and a number of batches were rejected because they did not meet specifications. An attempt to import 14,000 long tons (14,225 t) of steel and armor plate from the United States in 1939 failed, probably as a result of the Soviet invasion of Poland on 17 September 1939. Armor plate production was even more problematic as only 27,438 metric tons (27,005 long tons) were delivered in 1940 of the anticipated 30,000–32,000 metric tons (29,526–31,495 long tons) and 30–40% of that was rejected. Furthermore, the armor plants proved to be incapable of making cemented plates over 230 mm and inferior face-hardened plates had to be substituted for all thicknesses over 200 millimeters (7.9 in).

Machinery problems were likely to delay the ships well past their intended delivery dates of 1943–44. The Kharkhovskii Turbogenerator Works never completed a single turbine before the German invasion in June 1941. Another problem were the 305 mm guns and turrets as the armament factories were focused on the higher-priority guns for the Sovetsky Soyuz-class battleships. Prototypes of neither had been completed by the time the Germans invaded. The situation was not much better for the smaller guns as mountings for both the 152 mm and 100 mm guns were still incomplete on 22 June 1941 and all of these programs were terminated quickly afterwards.

=== Ships ===
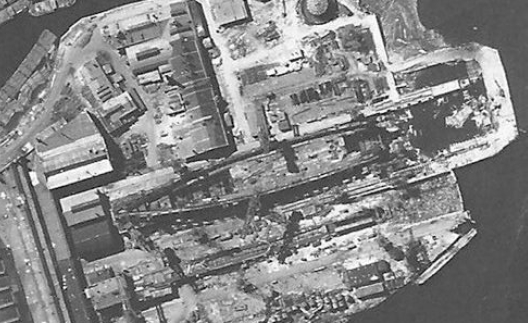
Luftwaffe aerial reconnaissance photo of Kronstadt under construction, 1 June 1942

The ships were originally intended to be laid down 1 September 1939, but they were delayed until November to allow improvements to the shipyards to be completed. A total of sixteen ships were planned in the August 1939 building program, but this was scaled back to four in July 1940 and two in October 1940 when it became clear just how unprepared the Soviets were for any large-scale naval construction program. Work on these ships ceased shortly after the German invasion.

Kronshtadt (Russian: Кронштадт) was built by the Shipyard No. 194, Marti in Leningrad. She was laid down 30 November 1939 and judged 10.6% complete when the Germans invaded. Her building slip was too short for her entire length so her stern was built separately. Some of her material was used during the siege of Leningrad to repair other ships and in defensive works, but she could have been finished after the end of the war. Proposals were made to complete her as an aircraft carrier and as a base ship for a whaling flotilla, but both ideas were rejected and she was ordered scrapped on 24 March 1947. Her dismantling began shortly afterwards and was completed the following year.

Sevastopol (Russian: Севастополь) was built by Shipyard No. 200, 61 Communards in Nikolayev. She was laid down on 5 November 1939 and estimated as 11.6% complete on 22 June 1941. She was captured by the Germans when they occupied Nikolayev in late 1941, but the Germans did little with her other than to use some of her material for defensive positions and some was apparently shipped to Germany. Before the Germans evacuated the city they damaged her building slip and hull with explosives and made her a constructive total loss. She was ordered scrapped on 24 March 1947 and her dismantling began shortly afterwards. It was completed in 1948.

== Developments ==
Project 69 was to be the basis of Project 71B large aircraft carrier, a WWII Soviet aircraft carrier project. The project began in 1939, but was suspended in 1940 due to the war, and was cancelled. It was to complement the Project 71A class based on the Chapayev-class cruiser. A different class, Project 72 was planned for 1944, but did not survive the post-WWII period.

== See also ==
- List of ships of the Soviet Navy
- List of ships of Russia by project number

== Bibliography ==
- Budzbon, Przemysław (1980). "Soviet Union". In Chesneau, Roger (ed.). Conway's All the World's Fighting Ships 1922–1946. Greenwich, UK: Conway Maritime Press. pp. 318–346. ISBN 0-85177-146-7.
- Budzbon, Przemysław; Radziemski, Jan & Twardowski, Marek (2022). Warships of the Soviet Fleets 1939–1945. Vol. I: Major Combatants. Annapolis, Maryland: Naval Institute Press. ISBN 978-1-68247-877-6.
- Campbell, John (1985). Naval Weapons of World War II. Annapolis, Maryland: Naval Institute Press. ISBN 0-87021-459-4.
- Garzke, William H. Jr. & Dulin, Robert O. Jr. (1980). British, Soviet, French, and Dutch Battleships of World War II. London: Jane's. ISBN 0-7106-0078-X.
- McLaughlin, Stephen (2004). "Project 69: The Kronshtadt Class Battlecruisers". In Preston, Antony (ed.). Warship. Vol. 2004. London: Conway's Maritime Press. pp. 99–117. ISBN 0-85177-948-4.
- McLaughlin, Steve (1991). "Question 52/90: Kronstadt and Stalingrad Class Battlecruisers". Warship International. XXVIII (4): 408–411. ISSN 0043-0374.
- Usov, V. Iu. & Mawdsley, Evan (1991). "The Kronshtadt Class Battle Cruisers". Warship International. XXVIII (4): 380–86. ISSN 0043-0374.
