= Soviet cruiser Slava =

Soviet cruiser Slava may refer to:

- Soviet cruiser Slava (1939), formerly Soviet cruiser Molotov
- Soviet cruiser Slava (1979), former name of Russian cruiser Moskva
