= Soviet cruiser Kaganovich =

Soviet Navy's Kirov-class cruiser

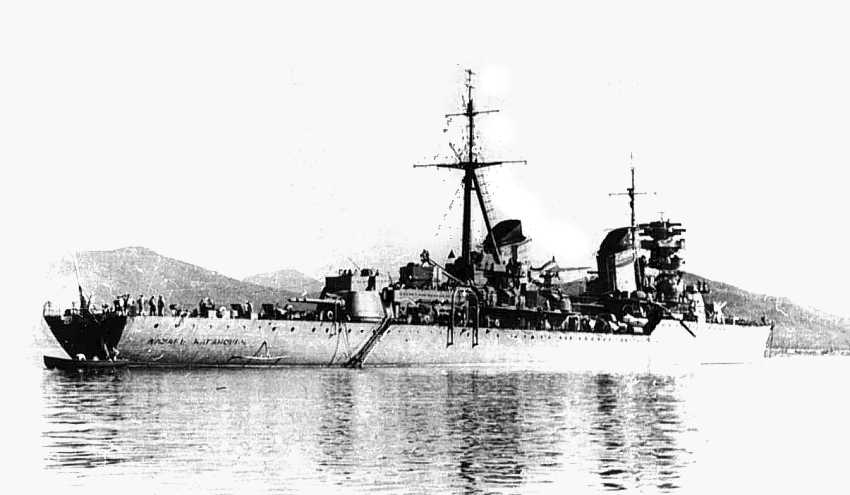
- Kaganovich in 1944

History

Soviet Union
- Name: Kaganovich
- Namesake: Lazar Kaganovich
- Builder: Shipyard 199, Komsomolsk-on-Amur
- Yard number: 8
- Laid down: 26 August 1938
- Commissioned: 6 December 1944
- Renamed: 3 August 1945 as Lazar Kaganovich; 3 August 1957 as Petropavlovsk
- Fate: Sold for scrap around 1960

General characteristics (Project 26bis2)
- Class & type: Kirov-class cruiser
- Displacement: 8,400 t (8,267 long tons) (standard); 10,040 t (9,881 long tons) (full load)
- Length: 191.2 m (627 ft 4 in)
- Beam: 17.66 m (57 ft 11 in)
- Draught: 6.3 m (20 ft 8 in) (full load)
- Installed power: 6 Yarrow-Normand boilers; 126,900 shp (94,600 kW)
- Propulsion: 2 shafts, 2 geared turbines
- Speed: 36 knots (67 km/h; 41 mph) (on trials)
- Endurance: 5,590 nmi (10,350 km; 6,430 mi) at 17 knots (31 km/h; 20 mph)
- Complement: 812
- Sensors & processing systems: ASDIC-132 and Mars-72 sonars
- Armament: 3 × 3 - 180 mm (7.1 in) B-1-P guns; 8 × 1 - 85 mm (3.3 in) 90-K dual-purpose guns; 6 × 1 - 45 mm (1.8 in) 21-K AA guns; 10 × 1 - 37 mm (1.5 in) 70-K; 6 × 1 - 12.7 mm (0.5 in) DShK AA machine guns; 2 × 3 - 533 mm (21 in) torpedo tubes; 100–106 mines; 50 depth charges
- Armour: Waterline belt: 70 mm (2.8 in); Deck: 50 mm (2.0 in) each; Turrets: 70 mm (2.8 in); Barbettes: 70 mm (2.8 in); Conning tower: 150 mm (5.9 in)
- Aircraft carried: 2 × KOR-2 seaplanes
- Aviation facilities: 1 ZK-2b catapult

Kaganovich (Russian: Каганович) was a Project 26bis2 Kirov-class cruiser of the Soviet Navy that was built during World War II. She was built in Siberia from components shipped from European Russia. She saw no action during the war and served into the Cold War. She was renamed Lazar Kaganovich in 1945 to distinguish her from Lazar's disgraced brother Mikhail Kaganovich. Her post-war career was generally uneventful, although her superstructure was badly damaged by a Force 12 typhoon in 1957. She was renamed Petropavlovsk (Russian: Петропавловск) in 1957. Sources disagree on her fate; some say that she was converted into a floating barracks in 1960 and later sold for scrap while another says that she was simply sold for scrap in 1960.

== Description ==
Kaganovich was 187 m (613 ft 6 in) long at the waterline, and 191.2 m (627 ft 4 in) long overall. She had a beam of 17.66 m (57 ft 11 in) and had a draft between 5.88 to 6.3 m (19 ft 3 in to 20 ft 8 in). Kaganovich displaced 8,400 tonnes (8,267 long tons) at standard load and 10,040 tonnes (9,881 long tons) at full load. Her geared steam turbines produced a total of 126,900 shaft horsepower (94,629 kW) on trials, but she fell somewhat short of her designed speed of 37 knots, only reaching 36 knots (67 km/h; 41 mph), on trials, because she was over 1,200 tonnes (1,181 long tons) overweight. She normally carried 650 tonnes (640 long tons) of fuel oil, 1,331 tonnes (1,310 long tons) at full load and 1,714 tonnes (1,687 long tons) at overload. This gave her an endurance of 5,590 nautical miles (10,350 km; 6,430 mi) at 18 knots (33 km/h; 21 mph) with overload fuel.

Kaganovich carried nine 180 mm (7.1 in) 57-caliber B-1-P guns in three electrically powered MK-3-180 triple turrets. The turrets were very small; they were designed to fit into the limited hull space available and were so cramped that their rate of fire was much lower than designed—only two rounds per minute instead of six. The guns were mounted in a single cradle to minimize space and were so close together that their shot dispersion was very high because the muzzle blast from adjacent barrels affected each gun. Unlike her half-sisters built in European Russia, her secondary armament initially consisted of eight single 85 mm (3.3 in) 90-K dual-purpose anti-aircraft guns. Kaganovich's initial light AA armament is unknown, although her sister ship Kalinin's initially consisted of six semi-automatic 45 mm (1.8 in) 21-K AA guns with 600 rounds per gun, ten fully automatic 37 mm (1.5 in) 70-K AA guns with a thousand rounds per gun, and six DK 12.7 mm (0.50 in) machine guns with 12,500 rounds per gun. During the 1950s her light anti-aircraft armament was replaced by nine powered 37 mm V-11 mounts.

Six 533-millimeter (21 in) 39-Yu torpedo tubes were fitted in two triple mountings, one on each side. She received the Lend-Lease ASDIC-132 sonar system, which the Soviets called Drakon-132, as well as the experimental Soviet Mars-72 system.

Kaganovich's radar suite is unknown, but it is likely she was equipped with a mix of Soviet and British and American Lend-Lease radars. At some point during the 1950s her radars were replaced by modern Soviet-built radars; Gyuys for air search, Rif for surface search, Zalp for main-armament gunnery and Yakor' for anti-aircraft gunnery.

== Service ==
Kaganovich was one of the Project 26bis2 cruisers, the third pair of the Kirov-class cruisers. She was larger and had a more powerful anti-aircraft armament than her half-sisters. She was assembled at Shipyard 199, Komsomolsk-on-Amur, from components built at the Shipyard 198 (Marti South) in Nikolayev. She was laid down on 12 August 1938, launched from drydock on 7 May 1944 and was officially accepted into the Pacific Fleet on 6 December 1944 after being towed down the Amur River to Vladivostok. She was still incomplete on this date and the official report of all work completed was not signed until 29 January 1947. Her construction was prolonged by late deliveries from western factories. For example, her propellers had to be shipped from Leningrad after it had been surrounded by the Germans in September 1941 and her propeller shafts had to be removed from the Barrikady factory in Stalingrad before it was destroyed by the Germans in 1942. Another problem was the collapse of nine girders supporting the roof of Dock 8 onto the ship in early December 1942.

She was renamed Lazar Kaganovich in 1945 to disassociate her from Lazar's disgraced brother Mikhail Kaganovich. She remained inactive during the Soviet invasion of Manchuria in 1945. She spent the post-war period on routine training missions. She was renamed Petropavlovsk on 3 August 1957 after Lazar Kaganovich was purged from the government after an unsuccessful coup against Nikita Khrushchev that same year. Her superstructure was badly damaged by a Force 12 typhoon on 19 September 1957. After attempts to sell her to the People's Liberation Army Navy failed due to the Sino-Soviet split, she was converted into a floating barracks on 6 February 1960 and later sold for scrap.
