= Soviet cruiser Maxim Gorky =

Soviet Navy's Kirov-class cruiser

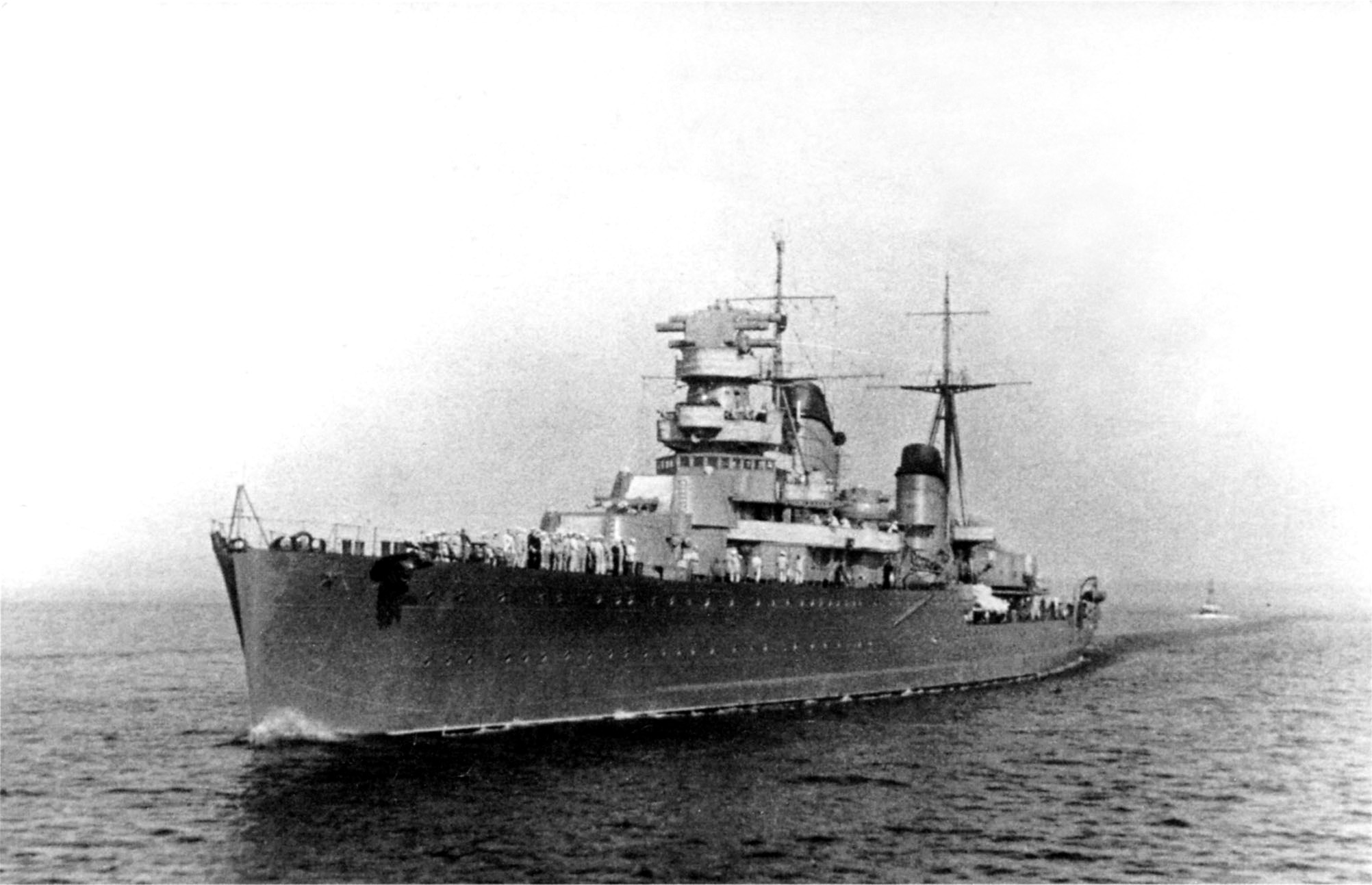
- Maxim Gorky

History

Soviet Union
- Name: Maxim Gorky
- Namesake: Maxim Gorky
- Builder: Ordzhonikidze Yard, Leningrad
- Yard number: 270
- Laid down: 20 December 1936
- Launched: 30 April 1938
- Commissioned: 12 December 1940
- Decommissioned: 17 February 1956
- Refit: Summer 1953
- Honors and awards: Order of the Red Banner; 22 March 1944
- Fate: Sold for scrap, 18 April 1959

General characteristics (Project 26bis)
- Class & type: Kirov-class cruiser
- Displacement: 8,177 t (8,048 long tons) (standard); 9,728 t (9,574 long tons) (full load)
- Length: 191.4 m (627 ft 11 in)
- Beam: 17.66 m (57 ft 11 in)
- Draught: 6.3 m (20 ft 8 in) (full load)
- Installed power: 6 Yarrow-Normand boilers; 129,750 shp (96,750 kW)
- Propulsion: 2 shafts, 2 geared steam turbines
- Speed: 36.72 knots (68.01 km/h; 42.26 mph) (on trials)
- Endurance: 4,220 nmi (7,820 km; 4,860 mi) at 18 knots (33 km/h; 21 mph)
- Complement: 963
- Sensors & processing systems: Arktur hydrophone
- Armament: 3 × 3 – 180 mm (7.1 in) B-1-P guns; 6 × 1 – 100 mm (3.9 in) B-34 dual-purpose guns; 9 × 1 – 45 mm (1.8 in) 21-K AA gun; 4 × 1 – 12.7 mm (0.50 in) AA machine guns; 2 × 3 – 533 mm (21 in) torpedo tubes; 96–150 mines; 50 depth charges
- Armor: Waterline belt: 70 mm (2.8 in); Deck: 50 mm (2.0 in) each; Turrets: 70 mm (2.8 in); Barbettes: 70 mm (2.8 in); Conning tower: 150 mm (5.9 in)
- Aircraft carried: 2 × KOR-1 seaplanes
- Aviation facilities: 1 ZK-1 catapult

Maxim Gorky (Russian: Максим Горький) was a Project 26bis Kirov-class cruiser of the Soviet Navy that saw action during World War II and continued in service into the Cold War. The ship's bow was blown off by a mine in the Gulf of Riga during the opening stages of Operation Barbarossa, but she made it to Kronstadt for repairs. However, after being repaired, the ship was trapped in harbour for most of the war, by Axis minefields at Leningrad and Kronstadt. Despite being trapped, Maxim Gorky was active in two engagements: the ship provided gunfire in support for the defenders during the Siege of Leningrad, and she later bombarded Finnish positions during the Vyborg–Petrozavodsk Offensive in mid-1944. She saw no further action in World War II. A major modernization was begun in 1953, but the navy reconsidered the cost-effectiveness of the refit and work was cancelled in 1955. Maxim Gorky was sold for scrap in 1959.

== Description ==
Maxim Gorky was 187 meters (613 ft 6 in) long at the waterline, and 191.4 meters (627 ft 11 in) long overall. She had a beam of 17.66 meters (57 ft 11 in) and had a draft between 5.87 to 6.3 meters (19 ft 3 in to 20 ft 8 in). She displaced 8,177 metric tons (8,048 long tons) at standard load and 9,728 metric tons (9,574 long tons) at full load. Her steam turbines produced a total of 129,750 shaft horsepower (96,750 kW) during her sea trials and propelled the ship to a maximum speed of 36.72 knots (68.01 km/h; 42.26 mph). This was barely short of her designed speed of 37 knots and was because she was over 900 tonnes (886 long tons) overweight. She normally carried 650 metric tons (640 long tons) of fuel oil, 1,660 metric tons (1,630 long tons) at full load and 1,750 metric tons (1,720 long tons) at overload. This gave her an endurance of 4,220 nautical miles (7,820 km; 4,860 mi) at 18 knots (33 km/h; 21 mph).

Maxim Gorky carried nine 180-millimeter (7.1 in) 57-calibre B-1-P guns in three electrically powered MK-3-180 triple turrets. Her secondary armament consisted of six single 100-millimeter (3.9 in) 56-calibre B-34 anti-aircraft guns fitted on each side of the rear funnel. Her light anti-aircraft guns consisted of nine semi-automatic 45-millimeter (1.8 in) 21-K guns and four DShK 12.7-millimeter (0.50 in) machine guns. Six 533-millimeter (21 in) 39-Yu torpedo tubes were fitted in two triple mountings.

=== Wartime modifications ===
By 1944 Maxim Gorky had exchanged her 45 mm (1.8 in) guns for 15 fully automatic 37 mm 70-K AA guns with one thousand rounds per gun, two extra DsHK machine guns and two quadruple Lend-Lease Vickers .50 machine gun MK III mounts.

When war broke out in 1941 Maxim Gorky lacked radar, but she was equipped with British Lend-Lease radar by 1944. One Type 291 was used for air search. One Type 284 and two Type 285 radars were for main battery fire control, while anti-aircraft fire control was provided by two Type 282 radars.

== Service ==
Maxim Gorky was laid down at the Ordzhonikidze Yard, Leningrad on 20 December 1936 as a slightly improved version, Project 26bis as designated by the Soviets, of the first pair of Kirov-class cruisers, which were called Project 26. She was launched on 30 April 1938 and was completed on 12 December 1938. The ship, and her escorts, ran into the German-laid "Apolda" minefield in the Gulf of Riga while providing cover for Soviet defensive mining efforts on 23 June 1941 and Maxim Gorky and the destroyer Gnevny both lost their bows, although Gorky made it to port where temporary repairs were made. The ship was transferred, with assistance, to Tallinn and later to Kronstadt. She had a new bow section fabricated at Kronstadt and it was mated with the ship on 21 July. For most of the rest of the war she was blockaded in Leningrad and Kronstadt by Axis minefields and could only provide gunfire support for the defenders during the Siege of Leningrad, for example she fired 285 180 mm shells on 4 September 1941 and 701 rounds during the Krasnoye Selo–Ropsha Offensive in January 1944. The cruiser was awarded the Order of the Red Banner on 22 March for her "exemplary fulfillment of combat missions" and the "courage and valor" demonstrated by her crew. She also bombarded Finnish positions as part of the 4th Artillery Group during the Soviet Vyborg–Petrozavodsk Offensive in June, firing a hundred 180 mm shells off Kuokkala on 9 June. Maxim Gorky was repeatedly, if lightly, damaged by German air and artillery attacks, but her only extended refit occurred over the winter of 1942–43 when her upper deck was reinforced with 37-millimetre armour plates.

== Postwar career ==
Following the end of the war, Maxim Gorky was transferred to the squadron of the 4th Fleet in the Southern Baltic when the Baltic Fleet was briefly divided on 25 February 1946. As the squadron headquarters she relocated to Liepāja and then Baltiysk. To participate in a parade, the cruiser briefly returned to Leningrad on 7 November 1947. Maxim Gorky tested the first Soviet naval helicopter, the Kamov Ka-10 in December 1950. The helicopter was located on the aft deck and made the first helicopter landing aboard a Soviet warship on 7 December, watched by chief designer Nikolay Kamov.

She was relocated to Kronstadt pending a refit at Shipyard No. 194 in mid-1953 and transferred to the ships of the Kronstadt Fortress on 16 June, leading the naval parade up the Neva River for Navy Day in July. The refit, which began late that year, was planned to include a complete overhaul of her machinery while her radar, fire-control systems and anti-aircraft guns were to be replaced by the latest Soviet systems. Torpedo bulges were to be fitted which would increase her displacement by 1,000 metric tons (980 long tons), with consequent penalties to her speed and range. The navy re-evaluated the scope of the work in 1955 and deemed it insufficient to create a fully modern ship and suspended the refit. Maxim Gorky was removed from the Baltic Fleet on 17 February 1956 before being similarly removed from the navy list and handed over for scrapping on 18 April 1959 after the navy had decided that she was unneeded as a missile-test ship.
