= Heinkel HD 15 =

1920s German aircraft

HD 15

General information
- Type: Postal seaplane
- National origin: Germany
- Designer: Ernst Heinkel
- Number built: 1

History
- First flight: 1927

The Heinkel HD 15 was a single-engine biplane seaplane, developed by the German aeronautical company Heinkel Flugzeugwerke in the late 1920s and remained at the prototype stage.

== Design ==
The HD 15 was a hydroplane with a central hull, characterized by an entirely wooden construction, from the biplane veiling, from the propulsion entrusted to a single engine in the trait configuration and a hull that integrated three separate and open cabins, with the front one, reserved for the pilot, unusually placed in front of the leading edge of the lower wing and directly below the propulsor, while the two rear ones were for the two passengers or the post.

== Development ==
In the twenties, Heinkel was contacted by the Japanese imperial navy to start the development of a steam powered aircraft catapult for the battle ship Nagato, a technology that facilitated the launch of reconnaissance aircraft, properly seaplanes, directly from the bridge with a considerable saving of time compared to the complex operations of sea launching by cranes.

The studies also attracted the attention of the summits of the Reichsmarine, the German navy of the period, which, however, due to the constraints imposed by the Treaty of Versailles could not explicitly introduce new technologies into their units. However, in 1927 the Ministry of Transport issued a specification for the provision of an aircraft suitable to facilitate and speed up the operations of delivering mail in transatlantic shipping routes, thus equipping large passenger ships of the same catapult technology whose experience could be easily reversed. in the military sphere.

The prototype was built during the year, together with the construction of a suitable catapult on board the transatlantic TS Bremen of the shipping company Norddeutscher Lloyd, then registered as D-1237. The tests on board took place for a limited period of time towards the end of 1928 without the HD 15 being actually used in service. Although the HD 15 remained a prototype only, it formed the basis of the Heinkel HD 55, which entered service with the Soviet Navy.

== Specifications ==
Data from

General characteristics

- Crew: Three
- Length: 10.70 m (35 ft 1 in)
- Wingspan: 12.43 m (40 ft 9 in)
- Empty weight: 1,364 kg (3,007 lb)
- Gross weight: 2,300 kg (5,071 lb)
- Powerplant: 1 × Gnome-Rhône 9Af Jupiter radial engine, 340 kW (450 hp)
- Propellers: 2-bladed

Performance

- Maximum speed: 172 km/h (107 mph, 93 kn)
- Cruise speed: 140 km/h (87 mph, 76 kn)
- Service ceiling: 4,300 m (14,100 ft)
