= Heinkel HD 55 =

HD 55, KR-1
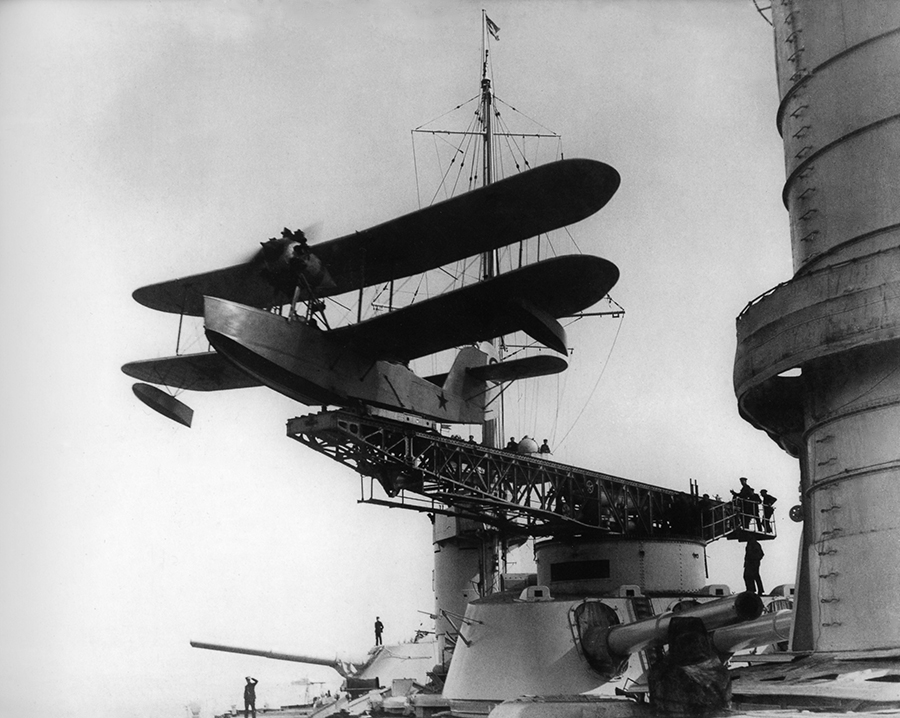

General information
- Type: Reconnaissance flying boat
- National origin: Germany
- Manufacturer: Heinkel
- Primary user: Soviet Navy
- Number built: approximately 40

History
- First flight: 1929

The Heinkel HD 55 was a biplane flying boat produced in Germany in the early 1930s for use as a reconnaissance aircraft aboard Soviet warships.

== History ==
The design was based on the HD 15 mail plane of 1927 and was a conventional design for its time, with equal span, unstaggered wings, and an engine mounted tractor-wise on struts above the pilot's open cockpit. A second open cockpit was added on the rear fuselage to provide a position for a tail gunner.

The HD 55 came about as a result of a meeting between Heinkel and Soviet officials in May 1929, leading to a contract for 15 such aircraft, and two pneumatic catapults similar to the type Heinkel had developed to launch the HE 12 mail plane from the Bremen, although this order was substantially increased as time went by. In Soviet service, the designation KR-1 was used (корабельный разведчик - Korabelniy Razvedchik - "Shipboard Reconnaissance").

The first catapult was installed on the battleship Parizhskaya Kommuna in October 1930, and trials commenced immediately, revealing problems with both the catapult and the aircraft. These difficulties were never fully resolved, and the KR-1 was plagued through its career by various structural defects. Nevertheless, the type was deployed into service, with catapults and aircraft installed at various times aboard the cruisers Chervona Ukraina, Komintern, Krasny Kavkaz, and Profintern. The type lingered on in service well into obsolescence in the mid-1930s, mostly due to the failure of its intended replacement, the Beriev Be-2. The final operational use of the KR-1 was around 1938, and by 1941 all had been either scrapped or placed in indefinite storage.

== Operators ==
Soviet Union

- Soviet Naval Aviation

== Specifications ==
General characteristics

- Crew: Two, pilot and gunner
- Length: 10.35 m (34 ft 0 in)
- Wingspan: 14.00 m (45 ft 11 in)
- Height: 4.28 m (14 ft 1 in)
- Wing area: 56.9 m^{2} (612 sq ft)
- Empty weight: 1,520 kg (3,350 lb)
- Gross weight: 2,270 kg (5,000 lb)
- Powerplant: 1 × Siemens-Halske Sh 20 , 360 kW (480 hp)

Performance

- Maximum speed: 194 km/h (120 mph, 100 kn)
- Range: 800 km (500 mi, 430 nmi)
- Service ceiling: 4,800 m (15,800 ft)

Armament

- 1 × fixed, forward-firing 7.62 mm (.30 in) PV-1 machine gun
- 2 × trainable, rearward-firing 7.62 mm DA machine guns
