= Kirov-class cruiser =

Class of Soviet light cruisers

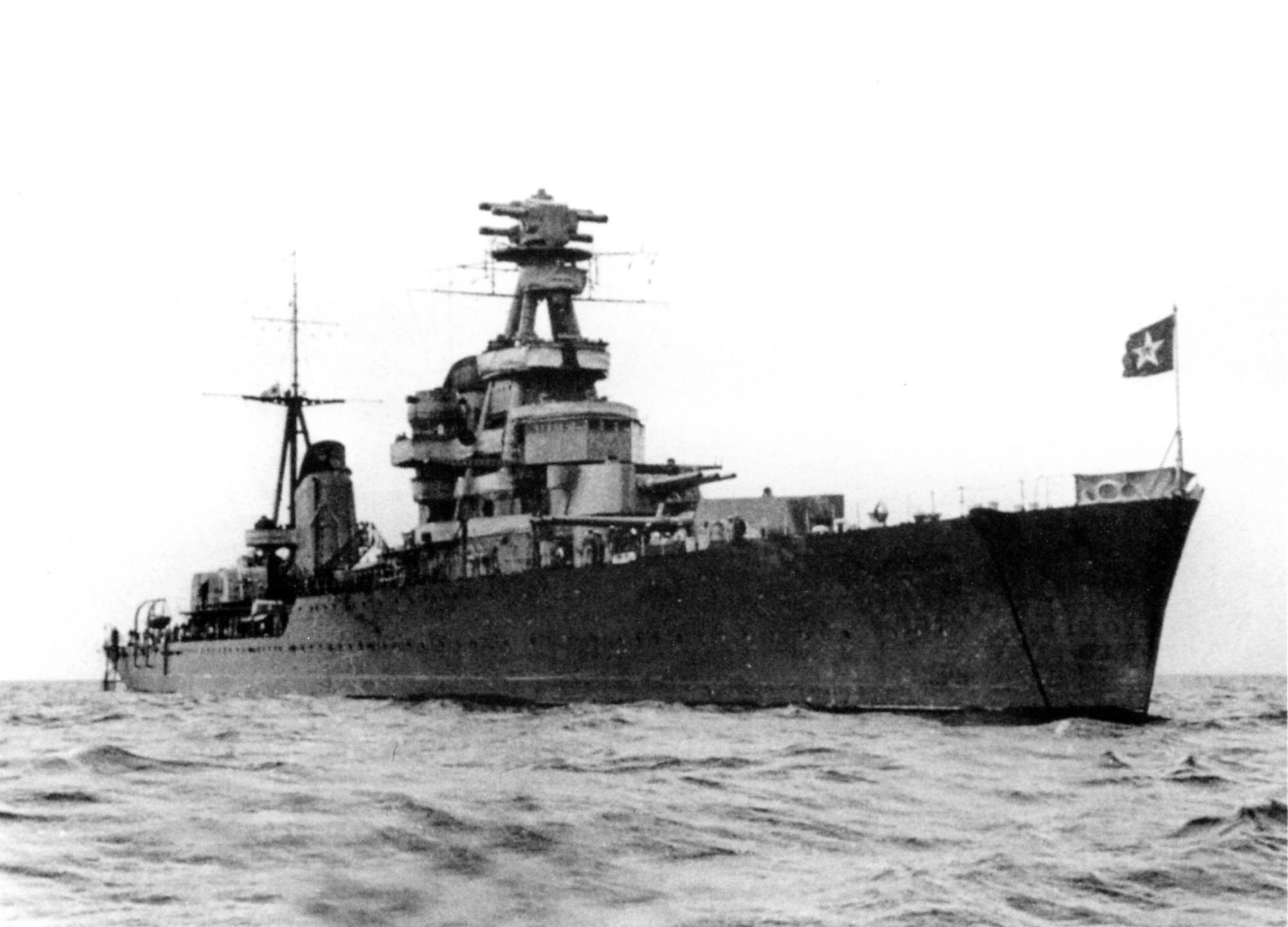
- Kirov in 1941

Class overview
- Name: Kirov class
- Builders: Ordzhonikidze Shipyard, Leningrad; Amur Shipbuilding Shipyard, Komsomolsk-on-Amur; Marti South Shipyard, Nikolayev
- Operators: Soviet Navy
- Preceded by: Admiral Nakhimov class
- Succeeded by: Chapayev class
- Subclasses: Project 26; Project 26bis; Project 26bis2
- Built: 1935–1944
- In service: 1938–1970
- Completed: 6
- Retired: 6

General characteristics (Project 26)
- Type: Cruiser
- Displacement: 7,890 t (7,765 long tons) (standard); 9,436 t (9,287 long tons) (full load)
- Length: 191.3 m (627 ft 7 in)
- Beam: 17.66 m (57 ft 11 in)
- Draught: 6.15 m (20 ft 2 in) (full load)
- Installed power: 6 Yarrow-Normand water-tube boilers; 113,500 shp (84,600 kW)
- Propulsion: 2 shafts, 2 geared steam turbines
- Speed: 36 knots (67 km/h; 41 mph)
- Endurance: 3,750 nmi (6,940 km; 4,320 mi) at 18 knots (33 km/h; 21 mph)
- Complement: 872
- Sensors & processing systems: Arktur underwater acoustic communication system
- Armament: 3 × triple 180 mm (7.1 in) guns; 6 × single 100 mm (3.9 in) DP guns; 6 × single 45 mm (1.8 in) AA guns; 4 × single 12.7 mm (0.50 in) AA machine guns; 2 × triple 533 mm (21 in) torpedo tubes; 96–164 mines; 50 depth charges
- Armour: Waterline belt: 50 mm (2 in); Deck: 50 mm (2 in) each; Turrets: 50 mm (2 in); Barbettes: 50 mm (2 in); Conning tower: 150 mm (5.9 in)
- Aircraft carried: 2 × KOR-1 seaplanes
- Aviation facilities: 1 Heinkel K-12 catapult

The Kirov-class (Project 26) cruisers were a class of six cruisers built in the late 1930s for the Soviet Navy. After the first two ships, armor protection was increased and subsequent ships are sometimes called the Maxim Gorky class. These were the first large ships built by the Soviets from the keel up after the Russian Civil War, and they were derived from the Italian cruiser Raimondo Montecuccoli, being designed with assistance from the Italian Ansaldo company. Two ships each were deployed in the Black and Baltic Seas during World War II, while the last pair was still under construction in the Russian Far East and saw no combat during the war. The first four ships bombarded Axis troops and facilities after the Germans invaded the Soviet Union in June 1941. All six ships survived the war and lingered in training and other secondary roles, with three being scrapped in the early 1960s and the other three a decade later.

== Design ==
Following the October Revolution and the subsequent Russian Civil War, Soviet industry was not capable of designing large, complex warships by itself and sought foreign assistance. The Ansaldo company provided plans for the contemporary Raimondo Montecuccoli-class cruisers and a design displacing 7,200 tonnes (7,086 long tons) and armed with six 180-millimetre (7.1 in) guns in twin turrets was produced in 1933. The Italians guaranteed that the cruiser could make 37 knots (69 km/h; 43 mph) on trials if the size was kept under the 7200-tonne limit. The designer of the new turret managed to persuade his superiors that he could fit triple turrets to the ship while keeping it within the specified limit, and this design was approved in November 1934 as the Project 26.

The Soviets bought an example of, and plans for, the machinery of the later Duca d'Aosta-class cruisers and had some difficulty in adapting the smaller hull for the larger and more-powerful machinery, so much so that it delayed the start of construction. Another problem was that the Italian design had to be adapted to use the Soviet preference for a mix of longitudinal framing for the hull framing amidships and transverse framing for the ends, while also reinforcing the hull structure to withstand the more-severe weather conditions that the Soviets commonly encountered.

The Kirovs were built in pairs, each pair incorporating some improvements over the earlier pair. These pairs were designated as the Project 26, Project 26bis, and Project 26bis2 in sequence. The differences between pairs usually related to size, armor, armament and aircraft.

=== General characteristics ===
The Project 26 class ships were 191.3 m (627 ft 7 in) long overall. They had a beam of 17.66 m (57 ft 11 in) and at full load a draft of 6.15 m (20 ft 2 in). They displaced 7,890 tonnes (7,765 long tons) at standard load, and 9,436 tonnes (9,287 long tons) at full load. Their single rudder meant that they were not very maneuverable. Kirov and Voroshilov were fitted with a massive tetrapod foremast, but this proved to restrict the view from the conning tower as well as the fields of fire of the 100 mm anti-aircraft guns and greatly increased their silhouette. It was reduced to a simple pole mast in the later ships and the superstructure enlarged to accommodate the fire control facilities formerly housed in the foremast.

Shortly after Kirov was launched in 1936, the two Project 26bis ships were laid down. They incorporated a number of changes from the first batch, not least of which was that they were larger. They displaced 8,177 tonnes (8,048 long tons) at standard load and 9,728 tonnes (9,574 long tons; 10,723 short tons) at full load. They were only slightly longer at 191.4 m (627 ft 11 in) overall and had a deep draft of 6.30 m (20 ft 8 in) at full load. On trials they proved to be the fastest ships of the class with a speed of 36.72 knots (68.01 km/h; 42.26 mph). Their armament was much the same as the earlier ships, although nine 45 mm (1.8 in) 61-K anti-aircraft guns were mounted rather than the six on the first pair and they were fitted to carry 150 Model 1908/39 mines in place of the Model 1912 mines.

The Project 26bis2 pair were still larger and displaced 8,400 tonnes (8,267 long tons) at standard load, and 10,400 tonnes (10,236 long tons) at full load. They were a tenth of a meter shorter than the Project 26 ships, although the waterline length did not change at all between any of the pairs. Their turbines proved to be slightly more powerful than those of the Project 26bis ships and propelled them at 36 knots (67 km/h; 41 mph) on trials. Production delays with the 100 mm B-34 dual-purpose guns forced them to use 85 mm (3.3 in) 90-K guns instead and ten 37 mm (1.5 in) 70-K anti-aircraft guns supplemented the 45 mm guns. The mines changed yet again as they could carry 100 KB or 106 Model 1926 mines.

=== Armament ===
The main armament consisted of three electrically powered MK-3-180 triple turrets with three 57-calibre 180 mm B-1-P guns. The turrets were very small to fit them into the hull space available and were so cramped that their rate of fire was much lower than designed (only two rounds per minute instead of six). The guns were mounted in a single cradle to minimize space and were so close together that their dispersion was very high because the muzzle blast from adjacent guns affected each gun. The turrets weighed approximately 236 to 247 tonnes (232 to 243 long tons), and the guns could be depressed to −4° and elevated to 48°. The guns fired 97.55-kilogram (215.1 lb) projectiles at a muzzle velocity of 900–920 m/s (3,000–3,000 ft/s); this provided a maximum range of around 38,000 m (42,000 yd), depending on ammunition and gun type. Normally, 100 rounds per gun were carried, although an additional four rounds per gun could be carried at overload by the Project 26 ships only.

The secondary armament consisted of six single 56-caliber 100-millimetre (3.9 in) B-34 anti-aircraft guns with 325 rounds per gun fitted on each side of the rear funnel in all ships except the Project 26bis2 which used eight single 52-caliber 85-millimetre (3.3 in) 90-K guns with 300 rounds per gun when the B-34 program ran into problems. Light AA guns initially consisted of six semi-automatic 45 mm 21-K AA guns with 600 rounds per gun and four DK 12.7-millimetre (0.50 in) machine guns, with 12,500 rounds per gun, but were significantly increased in service. The Project 26bis ships carried nine 21-K mounts and the Project 26bis were built with an additional ten fully automatic 37-millimetre (1.5 in) 70-K AA guns with a thousand rounds per gun. Over the course of World War II most, if not all, of the 45 mm guns were replaced by 37 mm guns and one or two Lend-Lease quadruple Vickers .50 machine gun MK III mounts were fitted to the ships in the Baltic and Black Seas, although each ship varied in its anti-aircraft suite.

Six 533-millimetre (21.0 in) 39-Yu torpedo tubes were fitted in two triple mountings; these tubes could be individually adjusted to spread out their salvos. Molotov and Kaganovich replaced their launchers with the more-modern 1-N mount during the war. A total of 96 KB or 164 Model 1912 mines could be carried by the first pair of ships. A pair of depth charge racks were mounted as well as four BMB-1 depth charge throwers. Twenty large BB-1 and thirty small BM-1 depth charges were carried although no sonar was fitted for the Project 26 and Project 26bis ships. They did mount the Arktur underwater acoustic communication system. Kalinin and Kaganovich received the Lend-Lease ASDIC-132 system, which the Soviets called Drakon-132, as well as the experimental Soviet Mars-72 sonar system.

The Project 26 ships were fitted with the Molniya fire control system for their main guns which included the TsAS-2 mechanical computer and the KDP3-6 director. Each turret and the director had DM-6 rangefinders which allowed multiple targets to be engaged using a combination of local and central fire control. The four later ships had an improved Molniya-ATs fire control system which could accept data from spotter aircraft. The anti-aircraft armament was controlled by the Gorizont-1 system with a SO-26 computer, Gazon vertical gyroscope and a pair of SPN-100 directors on each side of the superstructure. Each director had a fully stabilized 3 m (9 ft 10 in) rangefinder. Voroshilov had SPN-200 directors, but the Project 26bis ships used the Gorizont-2 system. This had a more advanced Gorizont-2 computer and Shar vertical gyroscope.

The first Soviet ship to carry a radar was Molotov which was given a Redut-K air warning system in 1940, which she used for the entire war. Lend-Lease radars equipped most of the other ships. The British Types 281, 291 and the American SG radars were used for air search. Main battery fire control radars were the British Types 284 and 285 while anti-aircraft fire control was provided by the Type 282 radar. Soviet-designed Yupiter-1 and Mars-1 gunnery radars were fitted in Molotov and Kalinin by 1944.

=== Machinery ===
The ships had a twin-shaft-unit machinery layout with alternating boiler rooms and engine rooms. The machinery for Kirov was shipped from Italy (being diverted from the contract for the Italian cruiser Eugenio di Savoia). The machinery for the rest was built in Kharkiv to Italian plans. The Soviet TB-7 geared turbines proved to be more powerful and more economical than the originals. Kirov burned .8 kg (1.8 lb) of fuel oil per unit of horsepower compared to Kalinin's .623 kg (1.37 lb). Furthermore Kirov produced only 113,500 shaft horsepower (84,600 kW) on trials while Voroshilov made 122,500 shp (91,300 kW) and was almost a full knot faster. Six license-built Yarrow-Normand type water-tube boilers powered the turbines with a nominal capacity of 106-tonnes/hour of superheated steam at a pressure of 25 kg/cm^{2} (2,452 kPa; 356 psi) and a temperature of 325 °C (617 °F). Each shaft drove a three-bladed 4.7-metre (15 ft) bronze propeller for a designed speed of 36 knots (67 km/h; 41 mph), although this varied from ship to ship. The normal oil capacity was between 600 and 650 tonnes (591 and 640 long tons), but the ships varied widely in the amount of oil carried at full load; this ranged from 1,150 to 1,660 tonnes (1,132 to 1,634 long tons). Endurance figures also varied widely at full load, from 2,140 to 4,220 nautical miles (3,960 to 7,820 km; 2,460 to 4,860 mi) at 18 knots (33 km/h; 21 mph). The maximum amount of fuel that could be carried ranged from 1,430 to 1,750 tonnes (1,407 to 1,722 long tons).

=== Protection ===
The armour scheme formed a raft around the vitals, protected by a waterline belt, deck and traverse bulkheads uniformly 50 mm (2.0 in) in thickness. The turret and barbette armour was also 50 mm thick. The conning tower sides were 150 mm (5.9 in) with a 100 mm roof. A 20-millimetre (0.79 in) box protected the steering gear and a number of control positions were protected against splinters: 14 mm (0.55 in) for the torpedo control station, 8-millimetre (0.31 in) for main-battery fire control and secondary gun shields, 7 mm (0.28 in) for the secondary-battery control position and the auxiliary command station had 25-millimetre (0.98 in) sides and roof.

The belt extended 121 m (397 ft 0 in) or 64.5% of the ship's length. Its total height was 3.4 m (11 ft 2 in), of which 1.33 m (4 ft 4 in) was below the designed waterline. A double bottom extended past the armored traverse bulkheads and a thin longitudinal bulkhead provided some measure of protection against flooding. It has been judged too thin to withstand a torpedo's detonation, but possibly the far-side bulkhead might survive intact, which would cause a list from asymmetrical flooding.

The armor of the Project 26 ships was vulnerable even to destroyer-class weapons at ranges under 10 km (6.2 mi) and the last four ships were given additional armor. The belt, traverse bulkheads, barbettes and turret face thicknesses were all increased to 70 mm (2.8 in) and the box protecting the steering gear was increased to 30 mm (1.2 in). One oddity of the later ships' armor scheme was the joint between the armour deck and belt. The top and bottom edges of the belt were tapered, the outer surface angling in 200 mm (7.9 in) from the edge to a thickness of 45 mm. Similarly the deck edge was also tapered down to about 25 mm for its outermost 200 mm. It has been speculated that "This seam in the protection, representing a small target area, may simply have served to save weight and simplify construction."

=== Aircraft ===
The Kirovs were designed to carry two aircraft, but German catapults had to be imported. Two Heinkel K-12 catapults were bought in 1937 for Kirov and Voroshilov. They could traverse 360° and launch an aircraft weighing 2,750 kg (6,060 lb) at a speed of 125 km/h (78 mph), although no suitable aircraft were in service until the KOR-1 seaplane entered service in September 1939. They proved to be unsuitable for rough-weather landings and were disembarked when Operation Barbarossa began. Gorky and Molotov mounted Soviet-built ZK-1 catapults of roughly comparable performance, but were destined never to use them for lack of suitable aircraft.

The Project 26 ships landed their catapult during 1941 to make room for more AA guns, as did Molotov in 1942. A ZK-1a catapult was installed aboard Molotov in 1943, and she conducted successful experiments with a catapult-launched Supermarine Spitfire fighter. The Project 26bis2 ships did not receive a catapult until after the end of the war, when a ZK-2b was fitted. The catapults, however, were removed from all ships by 1947.

== Construction ==
While Voroshilov was laid down first, Kirov was the prototype for the class and was completed first. Her trials were a disappointment as her Italian-built turbines initially had minor defects, and she was 1 knot (1.9 km/h; 1.2 mph) slower than guaranteed. The Italians pointed out that the guarantee only applied if she displaced 7200 tonnes or less, and she was overweight by over 500 tonnes (490 long tons; 550 short tons). Her turrets had numerous teething problems and inflicted more blast damage than anticipated, which showed that her welding plan had not been followed. Her firing arcs were reduced in an attempt to mitigate the problem. Voroshilov's Soviet-built turbines were more powerful than anticipated, and she almost achieved her design speed.

Components for the Project 26bis2 ships were manufactured in the West (Ordzhonikidze built those for Kalinin and Marti those for Kaganovich) and shipped to Komsomolsk-on-Amur for assembly. They were launched from drydocks and towed incomplete to Vladivostok for fitting-out.

== Ships ==
Construction data
| Ship | Project | Builder | Laid down | Launched | Commissioned | Fate |
|---|---|---|---|---|---|---|
| Kirov (Киров) | Project 26 | Ordzhonikidze Yard, Leningrad | 22 October 1935 | 30 November 1936 | 26 September 1938 | Scrapped, 22 February 1974 |
| Voroshilov (Ворошилов) | Project 26 | Marti South, Nikolayev | 15 October 1935 | 28 June 1937 | 20 June 1940 | scrapped 2 March 1973 |
| Maxim Gorky (Максим Горький) | Project 26bis | Ordzhonikidze Yard, Leningrad | 20 December 1936 | 30 April 1938 | 12 December 1940 | scrapped 18 April 1959 |
| Molotov (Молотов), later renamed Slava (Слава) | Project 26bis | Marti South, Nikolayev | 14 January 1937 | 4 December 1939 | 14 June 1941 | scrapped 4 April 1972 |
| Kaganovich (Каганович), later renamed Lazar Kaganovich and later still Petropavlovsk (Петропавловск) | Project 26bis2 | Amur Shipbuilding Plant, Komsomolsk-on-Amur | 26 August 1938 | 7 May 1944 | 6 December 1944 | scrapped 6 February 1960 |
| Kalinin (Калинин) | Project 26bis2 | Amur Shipbuilding Plant, Komsomolsk-on-Amur | 12 August 1938 | 8 May 1942 | 31 December 1942 | scrapped 12 April 1963 |

== Service ==
=== World War II ===
==== Baltic Fleet ====
Kirov was commissioned into the Baltic Fleet in the autumn of 1938, but was still being worked on into early 1939. She sailed to Riga on 22 October 1940 when the Soviet Union began to occupy Latvia; the following day she sailed for Liepāja. During the Winter War, Kirov, escorted by the destroyers Smetlivyi and Stremitel'nyi, attempted to bombard Finnish coast defense guns at Russarö, 5 kilometres (3.1 mi) south of Hanko. She fired only 35 rounds before she was damaged by a number of near misses and had to return to the Soviet naval base at Liepāja for repairs. She remained there for the rest of the Winter War and afterwards was under repair at Kronstadt from October 1940 to 21 May 1941.

Both Kirov and Maxim Gorky were transferred to the Gulf of Riga on 14 June 1941, shortly before the beginning of Operation Barbarossa. Both cruisers were active in the last days of June covering Soviet defensive mining operations, but Gorky and her escorts ran into the German-laid "Apolda" minefield on the 23rd and Maxim Gorky and the destroyer Gnevny both lost their bows. Gnevny sank, while Gorky made it to port before being transferred, with assistance, to Tallinn and later to Kronstadt. Kirov followed her to Tallinn at the end of the month, after being lightened to pass through the shallows of Moon Sound.

Gorky had a new bow section fabricated in Kronstadt and it was mated with the ship on 21 July. Kirov provided gunfire support during the defense of Tallinn and served as the flagship of the evacuation fleet from Tallinn to Leningrad at the end of August 1941. For most of the rest of the war both cruisers were blockaded in Leningrad and Kronstadt by Axis minefields and could only provide gunfire support for the defenders during the siege of Leningrad and support for the Soviet Vyborg–Petrozavodsk Offensive in mid—1944. Both ships were damaged by German air and artillery attacks, but were repaired during the war.

==== Black Sea Fleet ====
On 23 June 1941, Voroshilov covered Soviet destroyers bombarding Constanţa, but the destroyer leader Moskva was sunk by a mine and Kharkov was damaged by return fire. She bombarded Axis positions near Odessa in mid-September, but was transferred to Novorossiysk shortly afterwards. On 2 November, she was hit twice in harbor by Junkers Ju 88 bombers of KG 51; one hit started a fire in #3 magazine that was extinguished by water flooding in from the second hit. She had to be towed to Poti for repairs, which lasted until February 1942. She shelled Axis positions near Feodosiya on 2 April 1942, but was damaged by some near misses on 10 April and had to return to Batumi for repairs. In May she supported Soviet troops around Kerch and the Taman Peninsula while helping to transfer the 9th Naval Infantry Brigade from Batumi to Sevastopol. On 29 November 1942, she was damaged by nearby mine explosions while bombarding Feodonisi, but managed to return to Poti under her own power. Just after her repairs were completed she assisted Soviet forces landing behind German lines at the so-called "Malaya Zemlya" at the end of January 1943. The loss of three destroyers to German aircraft attempting to interdict the German evacuation of the Taman Bridgehead on 6 October 1943 caused Stalin to forbid the deployment of large naval units without his express permission and this meant the end of Voroshilov's active participation in the war.

Molotov was commissioned just before the German invasion and spent most of 1941 moving from port to port to take advantage of her air warning radar, the first fitted in the Soviet Navy. She bombarded Axis positions near Feodosiya in early November and was sent to reinforce Sevastopol with elements of the 386th Rifle Division from Poti. Damaged by a number of shell hits while off-loading troops on 29 December, she was still able to take 600 wounded when she departed. She reprised her role as a transport during the first week of January. Her bow was damaged during a heavy storm in Tuapse when it was thrown against the jetty on 21–22 January 1942. She spent most of the next month under repair, although her bow could not be straightened which reduced her speed by several knots. After making a number of bombardment sorties in support of Soviet troops on the Kerch Peninsula, she returned to Poti for more permanent repairs on 20 March. In June she made a number of transport runs in support of the garrison of Sevastopol. On 2 August her stern was blown off by torpedo bombers acting in concert with Italian MAS torpedo boats. The damage reduced her speed to 10 knots (19 km/h; 12 mph) and she had to be steered by her engines. She was under repair at Poti until 31 July 1943, using the stern of the incomplete Chapayev-class cruiser Frunze, the rudder of the incomplete cruiser Zheleznyakov, the steering gear from Kaganovich and the steering sensor from the submarine L-25. She saw no action after completing her repairs due to Stalin's order.

==== Pacific Fleet ====
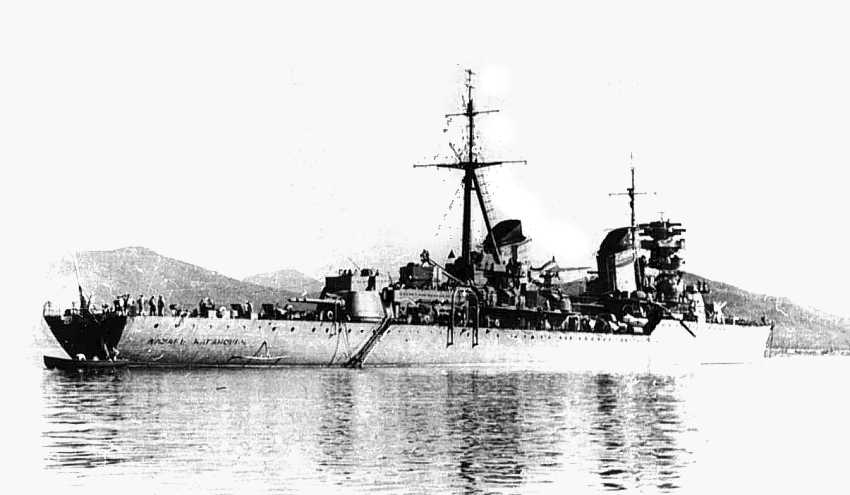
Cruiser Lazar Kaganovich

Even though Lazar Kaganovich and Kalinin were both commissioned before the end of the war, they saw no action during the Soviet invasion of Manchuria in 1945; in any event, Lazar Kaganovich was not fully completed until 29 January 1947.

=== Postwar careers ===
Kirov was damaged by a German magnetic mine while leaving Kronstadt on 17 October 1945. She was under repair until 20 December 1946. Refitted from November 1949 to April 1953, her machinery was completely overhauled, with her radars, fire control systems and anti-aircraft guns being replaced by the latest Soviet systems. She was reclassified as a training cruiser on 2 August 1961, regularly visited Poland and East Germany, and was sold for scrap on 22 February 1974. Two of her gun turrets were installed at Saint Petersburg as a monument. Maxim Gorky tested the first Soviet naval helicopter, the Kamov Ka-10, in December 1950 and began her refit in mid-1953. This was planned much like Kirov's refit, although her displacement was to increase 1,000 tonnes (984 long tons) from torpedo bulges, with consequent penalties to her speed and range. The Navy reevaluated the scope of the work in 1955, deemed it insufficient to create a fully modern ship, and suspended the refit. Gorky was sold for scrap on 18 April 1959 after it was decided that she was not required as a missile test ship.

Voroshilov began her postwar modernization in April 1954, but encountered the same issues as Maxim Gorky. Unlike her half-sister, she was selected for conversion as a testbed for missile development as Project 33 on 17 February 1956. The conversion process was quite prolonged, as her armament was removed and she received an entirely new superstructure and masts; and she was not recommissioned as OS-24 until 31 December 1961. She was modernized under Project 33M from 11 October 1963 to 1 December 1965. Converted to a floating barracks on 6 October 1972, she was briefly redesignated as PKZ-19 before being sold for scrap on 2 March 1973. Voroshilov's 14-ton propeller and 2.5-ton stop anchor are on display at the Museum of Heroic Defense and Liberation of Sevastopol on Sapun Mountain in Sevastopol.

Molotov suffered a fire in the #2 turret handling room on 5 October 1946 which required the magazine to be flooded; 22 sailors were killed and 20 wounded. She was used as a testbed for the new radars intended for the Chapayev and Sverdlov-class cruisers in the late 1940s. Modernized like her half-sister Kirov between 1952 and 29 October 1955, she was renamed Slava on 3 August 1957 after Vyacheslav Molotov fell out of favor with Nikita Khrushchev. She was reclassified as a training cruiser on 3 August 1961 and deployed to the Mediterranean during 5–30 June 1967 to show Soviet support for Syria during the Six-Day War. She returned to the Mediterranean between September and December 1970 where she assisted the Kotlin-class destroyer Bravyi after the latter's collision with the aircraft carrier HMS Ark Royal on 9 November 1970. She was sold for scrap on 4 April 1972.

Kalinin was placed in reserve on 1 May 1956, and was restored to the Navy List on 1 December 1957 before being disarmed and converted into a floating barracks on 6 February 1960. She was sold for scrap on 12 April 1963. Kaganovich was renamed Lazar Kaganovich on 3 August 1945 to distinguish her from Lazar's disgraced brother Mikhail Kaganovich. She was renamed Petropavlovsk on 3 August 1957 after Lazar Kaganovich was purged from the government after an unsuccessful coup against Nikita Khrushchev that same year. Her superstructure was badly damaged by a Force 12 typhoon on 19 September 1957 and she was deemed uneconomical to repair and sold for scrap on 6 February 1960.
