= Chapayev-class cruiser =

Class of light cruisers of the Soviet Navy

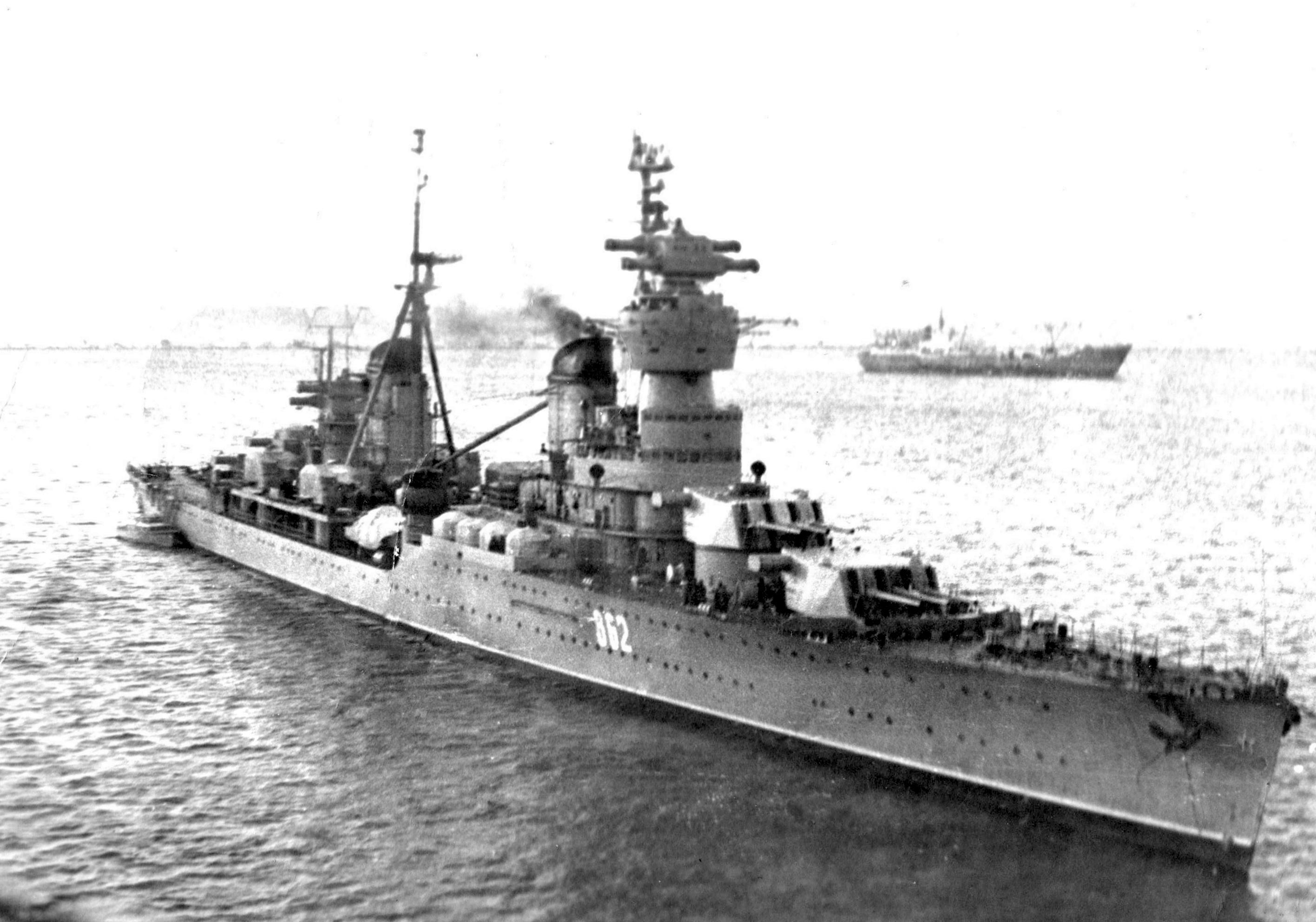
- Zheleznyakov in 1950

Class overview
- Name: Chapayev class
- Builders: Shipyard No.189 Ordzonikidze, Leningrad; Shipyard No.194 Marti, Leningrad; Shipyard No.198 Marti, Nikolaev; Shipyard No.200 61 Communards, Nikolaev
- Operators: Soviet Navy
- Preceded by: Kirov class
- Succeeded by: Sverdlov class
- Built: 1939-1951
- In commission: 1950–1981
- Planned: 17
- Completed: 5
- Canceled: 12
- Retired: 5

General characteristics Project 68
- Type: Light cruiser
- Displacement: 10,620 long tons (10,790 t) (standard); 13,420 long tons (13,640 t) (full load)
- Length: 201 m (659 ft)
- Beam: 18.7 m (61 ft)
- Draught: 6.5 m (21 ft)
- Installed power: 6 boilers; 110,000 shp (82,000 kW)
- Propulsion: 2 shafts; 2 geared steam turbines
- Speed: 35.6 knots (65.9 km/h; 41.0 mph)
- Range: 7,000 nmi (13,000 km; 8,100 mi) at 19 knots (35 km/h; 22 mph)
- Complement: 742
- Armament: 4 × triple 152 mm (6 in)/57 B-38 guns; 4 × twin 100 mm (3.9 in) B-54 guns; 6 × twin 37 mm (1.5 in) 66-K AA guns; 4 × twin 12.7 mm (0.50 in) DShK-M machine guns; 6 × 533 mm (21 in) torpedo tubes
- Armour: Belt: 100 mm (3.9 in); Conning tower: 130 mm (5.1 in); Deck: 50 mm (2.0 in); Turrets: 175 mm (6.9 in)

General characteristics Project 68K
- Type: Light cruiser
- Displacement: 11,130 long tons (11,310 t) (standard); 14,100 long tons (14,300 t) (full load)
- Length: 201 m (659 ft)
- Beam: 19.7 m (65 ft)
- Draught: 6.4 m (21 ft)
- Installed power: 6 boilers; 124,000 shp (92,000 kW)
- Propulsion: 2 shafts; 2 geared steam turbines
- Speed: 33.5 knots (62.0 km/h; 38.6 mph)
- Range: 7,000 nmi (13,000 km; 8,100 mi) at 19 knots (35 km/h; 22 mph)
- Complement: 840
- Armament: 4 × triple 152 mm (6 in)/57 B-38 guns; 4 × twin 100 mm (3.9 in)/70 SM-5 guns; 14 × twin 37 mm (1.5 in) V-11 AA guns
- Armour: Belt: 100 mm (3.9 in); Conning tower: 150 mm (5.9 in); Deck: 50 mm (2.0 in); Turrets: 175 mm (6.9 in)

The Chapayev class (Project 68 Чапаев) were a group of cruisers built for the Soviet Navy during and after World War II. Seventeen ships were planned in total, but only seven were actually started before the German invasion. Two incomplete ships were destroyed when their building yard in Nikolaev was captured by Nazi Germany and the remaining five cruisers were completed only in 1950, with the last ship serving until 1981.

== Design ==
As part of Stalin's 1936 "Big Fleet Programme", many light cruisers were to be built over the next ten years. Project 26 Kirov-class cruisers were planned to be constructed, but their armour and AA were considered inadequate. In August 1936, a new cruiser design similar to Kirov-class cruisers named Project 28 resolved these issues. They were to form the backbone of light forces flotillas with additional tasks including offensive minelaying, commerce raiding, and battleship screening against enemy light forces. The 3 triple 180 mm (7.1 in) gun turrets on the Kirovs were changed to 4 triple 152 mm (6.0 in) gun turrets, offering a higher rate of fire. On 29 October 1937, the navy changed its requirements to 3 triple 152 mm (6.0 in) guns and redesignated it as Project 68 before being reverted in March 1938.

The final design was approved in July 1939 and five ships were ordered. Seven ships were under construction by June 1941. Weapons and systems development lagged behind its construction, leading to a planned redesign of the first two ships with German weaponry in September 1940 designated Project 68I. The plan was cancelled since German guns were in development too, but German secondary guns were added to Chkalov, the second ship designated Project 68S.

The 152 mm B-38 guns could fire six to seven 55 kg (121 lb) shells 24,000 m (26,000 yd) in a minute. The guns were mounted in individual cradles with separate elevation.

The original secondary armament consisted of 4 twin 100 mm (3.9 in) B-54 guns in enclosed turrets. The anti-aircraft guns consisted of 6 twin 37 mm (1.5 in) Model 1939 guns and 4 twin 12.7 mm (0.50 in) DShK machine guns.

The design featured a larger hull and improved protection compared to the Kirov class. The machinery was based on a unit system with alternating boiler rooms and engine rooms.

The five surviving ships were completed after the war with the modified Project 68K design. The K in Project 68K stands for Korrektirovanniy (Russian: Корректированный, corrected). The modified design removed the aircraft facilities and torpedo tubes. It improved anti-aircraft artillery with twin 100 mm (3.9 in) SM-5 guns in powered turrets with a high fire rate and twin 37 mm (1.5 in) Model 1939 in a new powered and water cooled mounting.

== Ships ==
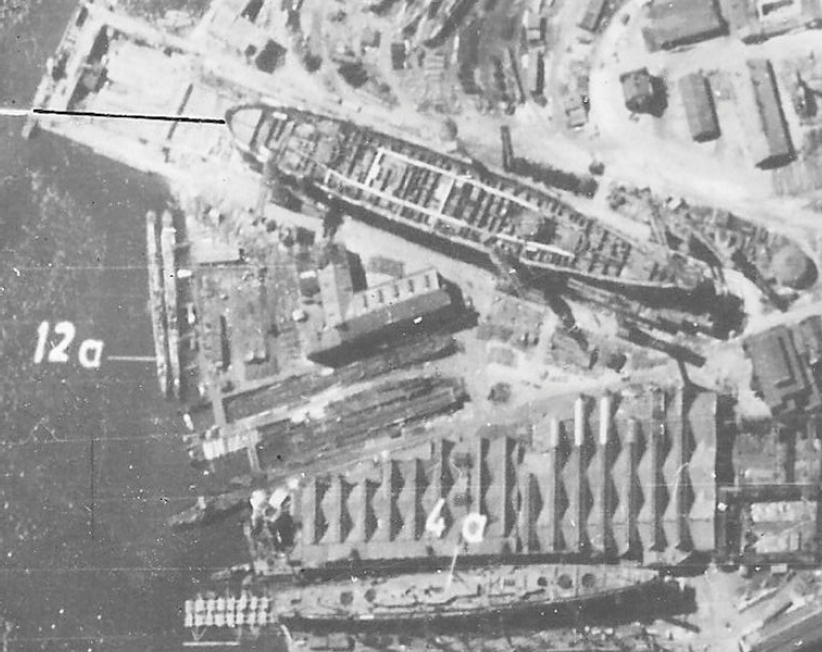
Luftwaffe aerial reconnaissance photo of the Ordzhonikidze Yard (Shipyard 189), Leningrad, showing the battleship Sovetsky Soyuz (top) and Chkalov under construction, 26 June

Seventeen ships were authorised in 1939 and eleven were ordered. Six ships were for the Baltic Fleet, four for the Black Sea Fleet and one for the Pacific Fleet. Seven ships were laid down before the German invasion in 1941.

- Chapayev (Чапаев)

Named after Vasily Chapayev,
Built by Ordzhonikidze Yard (Shipyard 189), Leningrad,
Laid down 8 October 1939,
Launched 28 April 1941,
Completed 16 May 1950,
Decommissioned 29 October 1960

- Zheleznyakov (Железняков)

Named after Anatoli Zheleznyakov (1895-1919),
Built by Admiralty Shipyard (Shipyard 194), Leningrad,
Laid down 31 October 1939,
Launched 25 June 1941,
Completed 19 April 1950,
Decommissioned 1976

- Kuybyshev (Куйбышев)

Named after Valerian Kuybyshev,
Built by Marti Yard (Shipyard 200), Nikolayev,
Laid down 31 August 1939,
Launched 31 January 1941, evacuated to Poti, Georgia
Completed 22 December 1950,
Decommissioned 1965

- Chkalov (Чкалов) – later renamed Komsomolets,

Originally named after Valery Chkalov,
Built by Ordzhonikidze Yard, Leningrad,
Laid down 31 August 1939,
Launched 25 October 1947,
Completed 1 November 1950,
Decommissioned 1981

- Frunze (Фрунзе)

Named after Mikhail Frunze,
Built by Marti Yard, Nikolayev,
Laid down 29 August 1939,
Launched 31 December 1940, evacuated to Poti, Georgia; stern used to repair damaged cruiser Molotov,
Completed 15 December 1950,
Decommissioned 1960

Two ships, Ordzhonikidze and Sverdlov, were scrapped on the slipway after being captured by Germans in Nikolaev during World War II.

Ten more ships were planned to be laid down: Lenin, Dzerzhinsky, Avrora, Lazo, and an unnamed fifth in 1941, and Zhdanov, Parkhomenko, Kotovsky, Shchors, and Shcherbakov in 1942–1943. However, the German invasion led to their cancellation in July 1941.

== Developments ==
It had been planned that Project 68 class would be the basis for Project 71 Soviet light aircraft carrier class, by Design Bureau 45 "Neskoye". Planning started in 1937, with approval coming through in 1938. By 1939, Jane's Fighting Ships had recorded that the first ship would be the Red Banner. The first hull was planned to be laid down by 1942, however WWII interfered with these plans, and the class was cancelled. A complimentary large aircraft carrier project was initiated in 1939 as Project 71B, based on the Kronshtadt-class battlecruiser, that also did not survive the war; with this adaptation becoming Project 71A. A modified larger design, Project 72, was still active in 1944, but did not survive the post-War period.

== Bibliography ==
- Budzbon, Przemysław (1980). "Soviet Union". In Chesneau, Roger (ed.). Conway's All the World's Fighting Ships 1922–1946. Greenwich, UK: Conway Maritime Press. pp. 318–346. ISBN 0-85177-146-7.
- Budzbon, Przemysław; Radziemski, Jan & Twardowski, Marek (2022). Warships of the Soviet Fleets 1939–1945. Vol. I: Major Combatants. Annapolis, Maryland: Naval Institute Press. ISBN 978-1-68247-877-6.
- Jarovoj, V. V.; Greger, René (1994). "The Soviet Cruisers of the Chapayev and Sverdlov classes". In Roberts, John (ed.). Warship 1994. London: Conway Maritime Press. pp. 147–158. ISBN 0-85177-630-2.
- Friedman, Norman (1995). "Soviet Union 1947–1991: Russian Federation and Successor States 1991–". In Chumbley, Stephen (ed.). Conway's All the World's Fighting Ships 1947–1995. Annapolis: Naval Institute Press. pp. 337–426. ISBN 978-1-55750-132-5.
- Polmar, Norman & Genda, Minoru (2006). Aircraft Carriers: A History of Carrier Aviation and Its Influence on World Events. Vol. II: 1946–2006. Washington, D.C.: Potomac Books. ISBN 978-1-57488-665-8.
- Whitley, M. J. (1995). Cruisers of World War Two: An International Encyclopedia. London: Cassell. ISBN 1-86019-874-0.
