= Beriev Be-4 =

1940 Soviet reconnaissance flying boat

Be-4
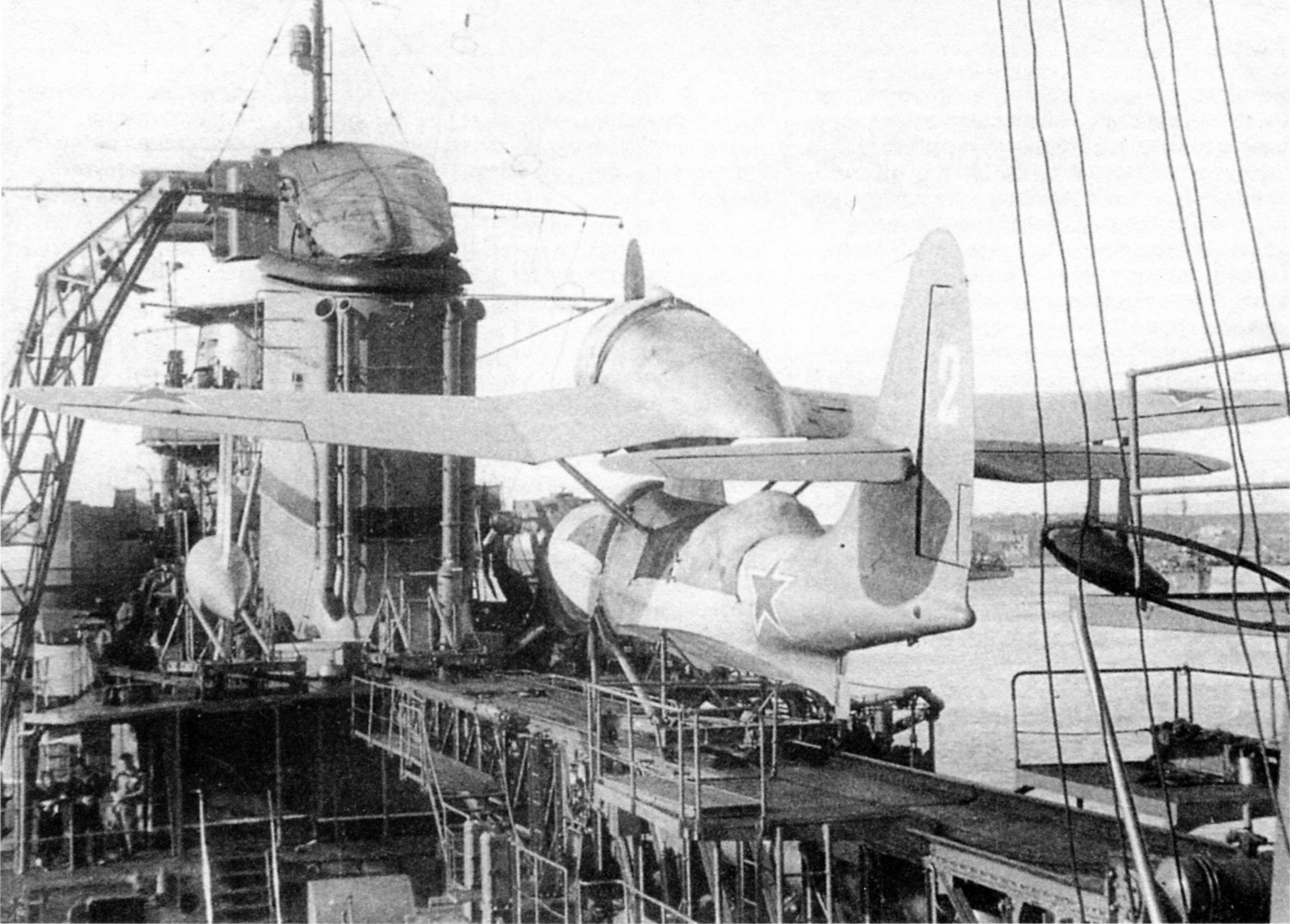
- Be-4 on the Soviet cruiser Molotov, 1941.

General information
- Type: Reconnaissance flying boat
- Manufacturer: Beriev
- Primary user: Soviet Naval Aviation
- Number built: ca. 47

History
- Introduction date: 1942
- First flight: 21 October 1940

The Beriev Be-4 (originally designated KOR-2) was a reconnaissance flying boat built to operate from Soviet warships during World War II.

== Design and development ==
In 1939, Beriev was ordered to develop a successor to the KOR-1 design, which would overcome the numerous problems encountered in operational experience with that design. The new aircraft, with the in-house designation KOR-2, first flew on 21 October 1940 at the Beriev factory in Taganrog.

The Be-4 was an elegant, parasol-winged monoplane with a slight inverse-gull wing. The large radial engine was mounted in a nacelle above the fuselage.

Testing continued through January 1941, when series production was ordered under the designation Be-4, at a factory near Moscow. However, due to the start of World War II, only two aircraft were completed. The factory was dismantled, and evacuated to Omsk, then to Krasnoyarsk, where production resumed in May 1943 to the end of 1945. A total of 47 aircraft were eventually completed.

== Operational history ==
The Be-4 was placed into operational service with the Russian Black Sea Fleet from 1942, where it was used for coastal reconnaissance, anti-submarine and transport duties. It was also used on the cruisers Maxim Gorki and Kirov.

== Operators ==
Soviet Union

- Soviet Naval Aviation

== Specifications ==
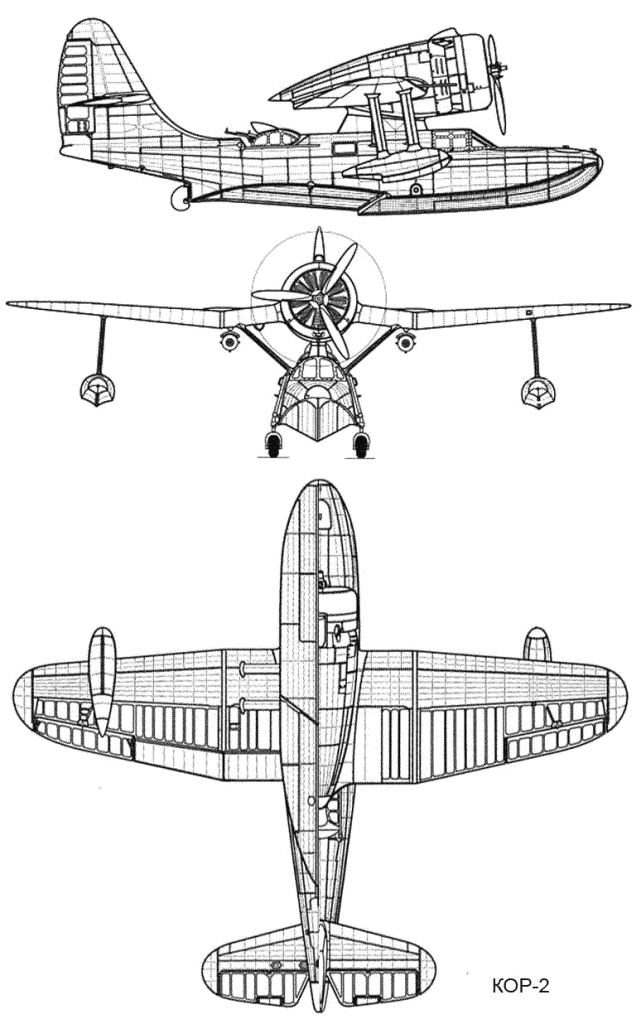

General characteristics

- Crew: three
- Length: 10.50 m (34 ft 5 in)
- Wingspan: 12.00 m (39 ft 4 in)
- Height: 4.05 m (13 ft 3 in)
- Wing area: 25.5 m^{2} (274 sq ft)
- Empty weight: 2,082 kg (4,590 lb)
- Gross weight: 2,760 kg (6,085 lb)
- Powerplant: 1 × Shvetsov M-62 radial , 746 kW (1,000 hp)

Performance

- Maximum speed: 356 km/h (221 mph, 192 kn)
- Range: 1,150 km (716 mi, 622 nmi)
- Service ceiling: 8,100 m (26,575 ft)

Armament

- 1 × trainable 7.62 mm ShKAS machine gun for observer
- up to 300 kg (661 lb) of bombs or depth charges

== See also ==
Related lists

- List of aircraft of World War II
