= Beriev Be-2 =

Reconnaissance seaplane

Be-2
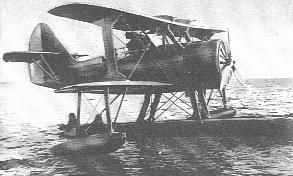

General information
- Type: Reconnaissance seaplane
- Manufacturer: Beriev
- Primary user: Soviet Navy
- Number built: 12

History
- Introduction date: 1938
- First flight: April 1936
- Retired: 1942

The Beriev Be-2 (originally designated KOR-1) was a two-seat reconnaissance seaplane built for the Soviet Navy shortly before World War II. It was designed to replace the Navy's obsolete license-produced Heinkel He 55 aircraft operating from warships and shore bases.

== Design and development ==
The Be-2 was an all-metal biplane floatplane, with two open cockpits in tandem for the pilot and observer. The wings were braced, but designed to be folded back for storage on a warship. The float arrangement consisted of a large central float, with two smaller floats on the wings. The Be-2 was powered by a Shvetsov M-25 radial 9-cylinder air-cooled engine (a copy of the American Wright R-1820) with a rating of 700 hp (520 kW).

From the outset, Be-2 design exhibited serious handling difficulties and maintenance problems. However, due to the lack of a suitable alternative, the design was placed into production. A total of around 12 serial aircraft were produced. By June 1941, six KOR-1 were in the Baltic, five were in the Black Sea Fleet Air Force.

== Operational history ==
As problems with stability on the water while taxiing, and with maintenance of the engine were never really resolved, that in practice, the Be-2 was restricted to training and secondary roles, and was more often deployed from land than from warships as originally planned. In addition, delays with updating the Navy's cruisers meant that suitable catapults were not installed until about 1939.

With the outbreak of war with Germany, all attempts to deploy the troublesome aircraft from ships were finally abandoned. During the early years of the war, they served as shore-based reconnaissance and search/rescue aircraft on the Baltic, and with their float undercarriage replaced by wheels, some were pressed into service as strike aircraft during the Battle of Sevastopol. They were withdrawn from service in 1942.

== Operators ==
Soviet Union

- Soviet Naval Aviation

== Specifications ==
General characteristics

- Crew: two, pilot and observer
- Length: 8.67 m (28 ft 3 in)
- Wingspan: 11.00 m (36 ft 1 in)
- Height: 3.80 m (12 ft 6 in)
- Wing area: 29.3 m^{2} (315 sq ft)
- Empty weight: 1,800 kg (3,970 lb)
- Gross weight: 2,686 kg (5,920 lb)
- Powerplant: 1 × Shvetsov M-25A radial engine , 522 kW (700 hp)

Performance

- Maximum speed: 245 km/h (152 mph, 132 kn)
- Range: 1,000 km (621 mi, 540 nmi)
- Service ceiling: 6,600 m (21,654 ft)

Armament

- 2 × fixed, forward-firing 7.62 mm ShKAS machine guns
- 1 × flexible 7.62 mm ShKAS machine gun for observer
- 100 kg (220 lb) of bombs

== See also ==
Related lists

- List of interwar military aircraft
- List of aircraft of World War II
