= 180 mm Pattern 1931–1933 =

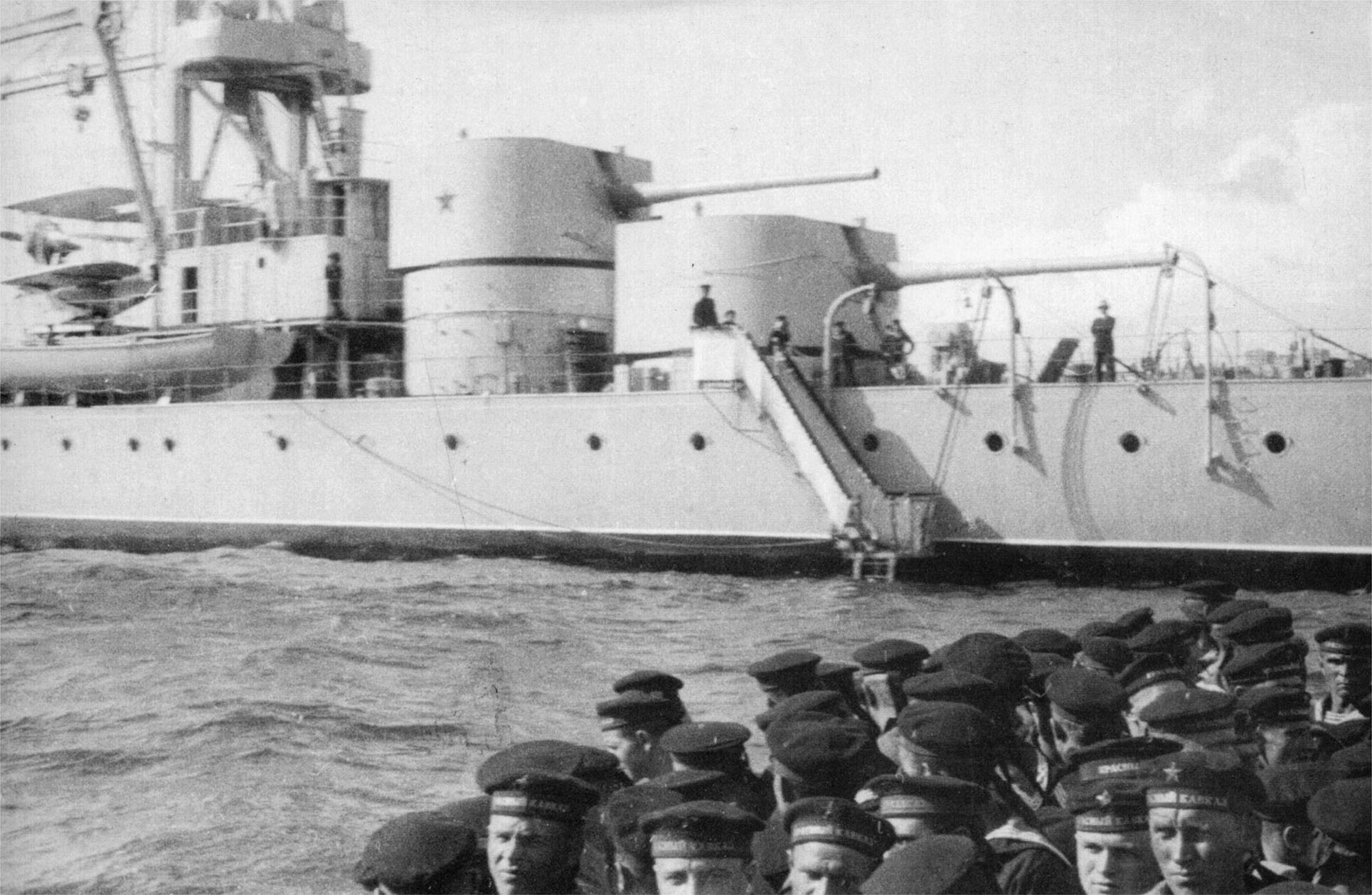
- MK-1-180 single turrets aboard the Soviet light cruiser Krasnyi Kavkaz
- Type: Naval gun Coastal artillery Railway gun
- Place of origin: Soviet Union

Service history
- In service: 1931–1990s
- Used by: Soviet Union
- Wars: World War II

Production history
- Designed: 1929
- Produced: 1931–1933
- Variants: 180 mm/60 Pattern 1931; 180mm/57 Pattern 1932; 180 mm/56 Pattern 1933

Specifications
- Mass: 17–18.5 t (18.7–20.4 short tons)
- Length: 10.2–10.6 m (33–35 ft)
- Barrel length: 8–8.2 m (26–27 ft)
- Shell: Separate loading bagged charge and projectile
- Shell weight: 97.5 kg (215 lb)
- Caliber: 180 mm (7.1 in) 56-60 Caliber
- Elevation: Single naval mounts: -5°to +60° Triple naval mounts: -5° to +50° Coastal & Rail mounts: -0° to +50°
- Rate of fire: 4-5 rpm
- Muzzle velocity: 900 m/s (3,000 ft/s)
- Maximum firing range: 37.1–38.5 km (23.1–23.9 mi) at +50°

The 180 mm Pattern 1931–1933 were a family of related naval guns of the Soviet Navy in World War II, which were later modified for coastal artillery and railway artillery roles. They were the primary armament of the Soviet Union's first cruisers built after the Russian Civil War.

== History ==
The 180 mm Pattern 1931–1933 guns weren't a single model of gun, but instead were a family of related guns, either built from converted 203 mm (8.0 in)/50 Pattern 1905 guns which were relined down to 180 mm (7.1 in) or they were newly built guns. The original guns were constructed of a three piece A tube, reinforced by two layers of outer tubes and a jacket. The lengths of these guns varied between 56-60 calibers and their weights varied, but their performance was similar.

The main variants of gun and mount were:
- 180 mm/60 B-1-K Pattern 1931 – Naval guns converted from earlier 203 mm guns in MK-1-180 single turrets.
- 180 mm/57 B-1-P Pattern 1932 – Newly-built naval guns in MK-3-180 triple turrets.
- 180 mm/56 Pattern 1933 – Coastal artillery built from converted 203 mm guns in open MO-8-180 or MO-1-180 single mounts and MB-2-180 twin turrets.
- 180 mm/56 Pattern 1933 – Railway artillery converted from earlier 203 mm guns on TM-1-180, single gun, shielded mounts.

== Naval use ==
180mm/60 B-1-K Pattern 1931
In 1927 work on the former Imperial Russian Navy Admiral Nakhimov-class cruiser Krasnyi Kavkaz was restarted after being halted in 1917 following the October Revolution. It had been planned to arm the Krasnyi Kavkaz with eight 203mm guns in double turrets, but it was found impossible to mount this much armament on such a small and lightly constructed hull. Instead four smaller caliber 180mm/60 B-1-K Pattern 1931 guns were mounted in single turrets. Early testing found that the muzzle velocity for these guns was abnormally high which reduced barrel life to only 55-70 rounds, so the guns were derated and smaller propellant charges were used.

180 mm/57 B-1-P Pattern 1932
Since the pattern 1931 wasn't satisfactory a new gun design with a lower muzzle velocity and shorter barrel length designated the 180 mm/57 B-1-P Pattern 1932 was produced. Early prototypes were of built-up construction, but in 1932 the technology for producing loose liners was purchased from the Italian firm of Ansaldo. Later 180 mm/57 B-1-P Pattern 1932 guns were constructed of a loose liner, A tube, jacket and breech ring. The 180 mm/57 B-1-P Pattern 1932 were manufactured with two different styles of liners, one had shallow rifling and the other had deep rifling, the two liners were not interchangeable and required different ammunition. The shallow rifled liners still only had a life of 55-70 rounds, but the deeply rifled liners had a life of 320 rounds.

In 1933 the Soviets purchased plans for the contemporary Raimondo Montecuccoli-class (third in the sequence of Italian Condottieri-class light cruisers) from the Italian firm of Ansaldo. This new class of cruisers was known as the Kirov-class and were armed with nine 180 mm/57 B-1-P Pattern 1932 (7.1 in) guns in three MK-3-180 triple turrets. Like their Italian contemporaries the Kirov-class cruisers suffered many of the same design flaws. These included abnormally high muzzle velocity and poor barrel life. Shot dispersion due to the guns being mounted too closely together on a common cradle and crowded turrets which hampered crew efficiency, ammunition handling and rate of fire.

== Coastal Artillery ==
180 mm/56 Pattern 1933 – Coastal artillery built from converted 203 mm guns. The barrels for these guns were shortened from the original 60 calibers to 56 calibers and they were mounted on open MO-8-180 or MO-1-180 single mounts and MB-2-180 twin turrets. Ballistic performance was similar to the 180 mm/60 B-1-K Pattern 1931, these guns also had short barrel lives and reduced charges were used to prolong barrel life. These guns were deployed in defensive emplacements along the Pacific, Arctic, Baltic and Black Sea coasts.

== Railway Artillery ==
180 mm/56 Pattern 1933 – Railway artillery built from converted 203 mm guns. The barrels for these guns were shortened from the original 60 calibers to 56 calibers and they were mounted on TM-1-180, single gun, shielded mounts. Ballistic performance was similar to the 180 mm/60 B-1-K Pattern 1931, these guns also had short barrel lives and reduced charges were used to prolong barrel life.

== Photo gallery ==
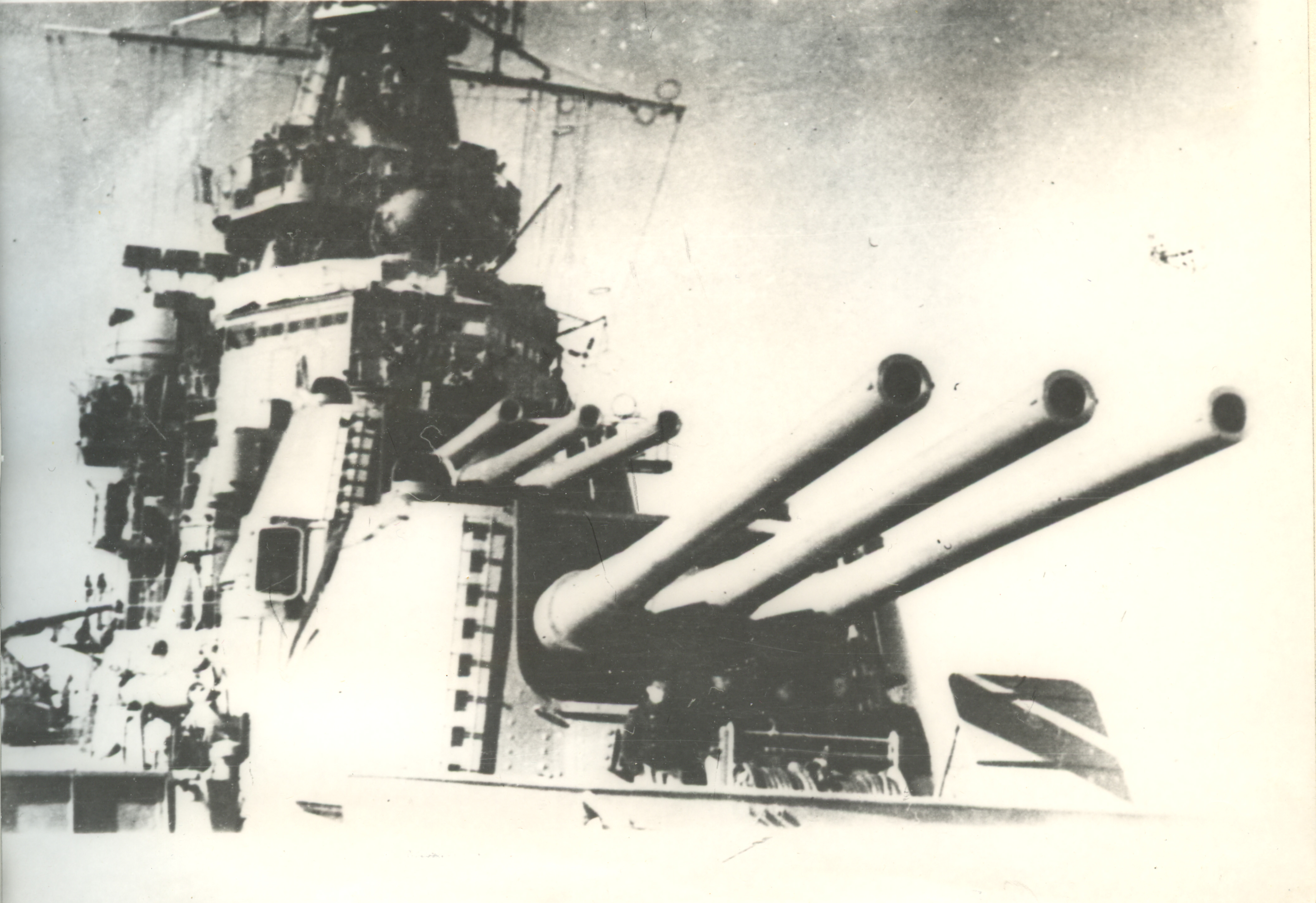
MK-3-180 triple turrets aboard the Kirov-class light cruiser Voroshilov.

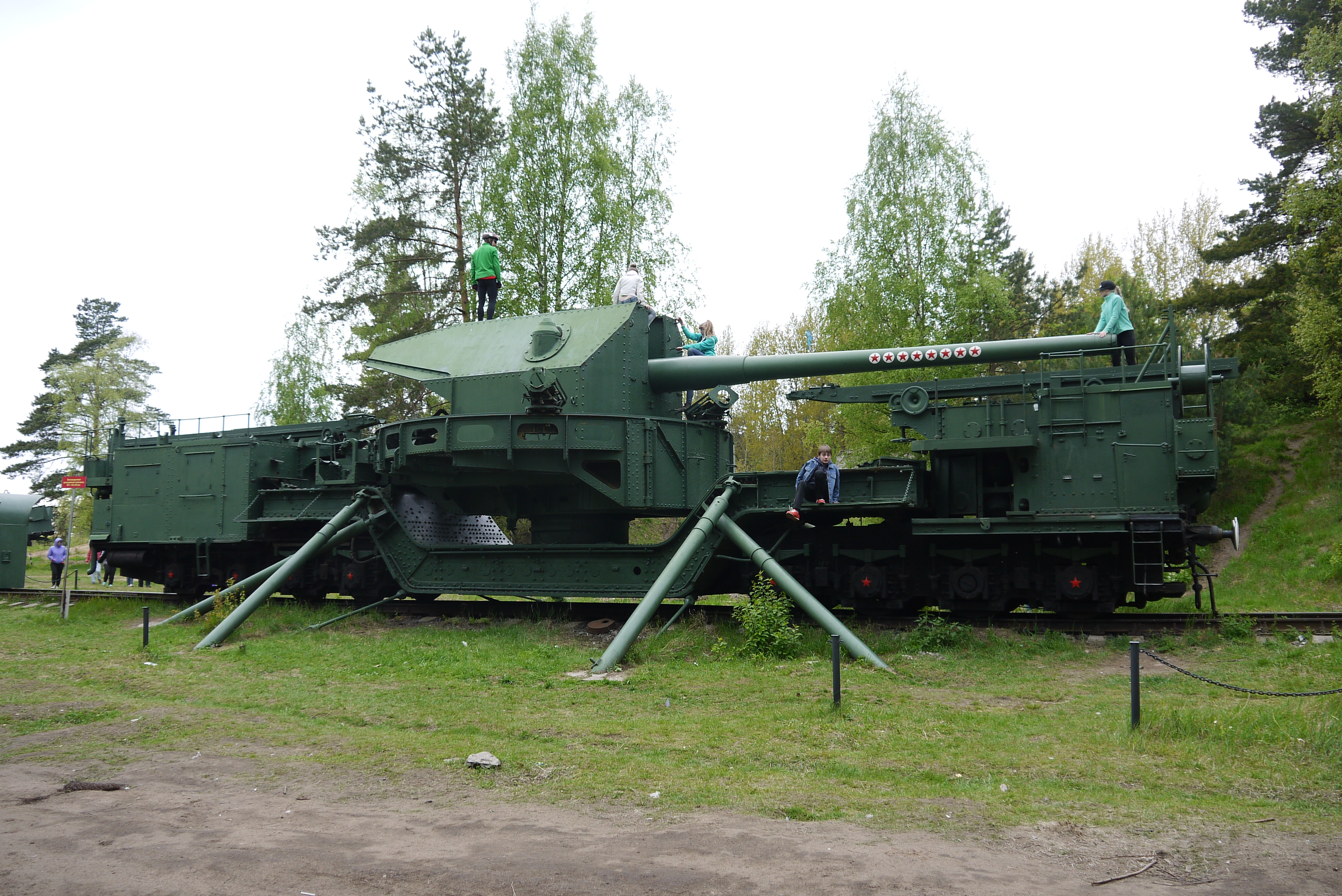
A single mount ТМ-1-180 railway gun at Krasnaya Gorka fort.
