= Soviet cruiser Aleksandr Nevsky =

Soviet Sverdlov-class cruiser

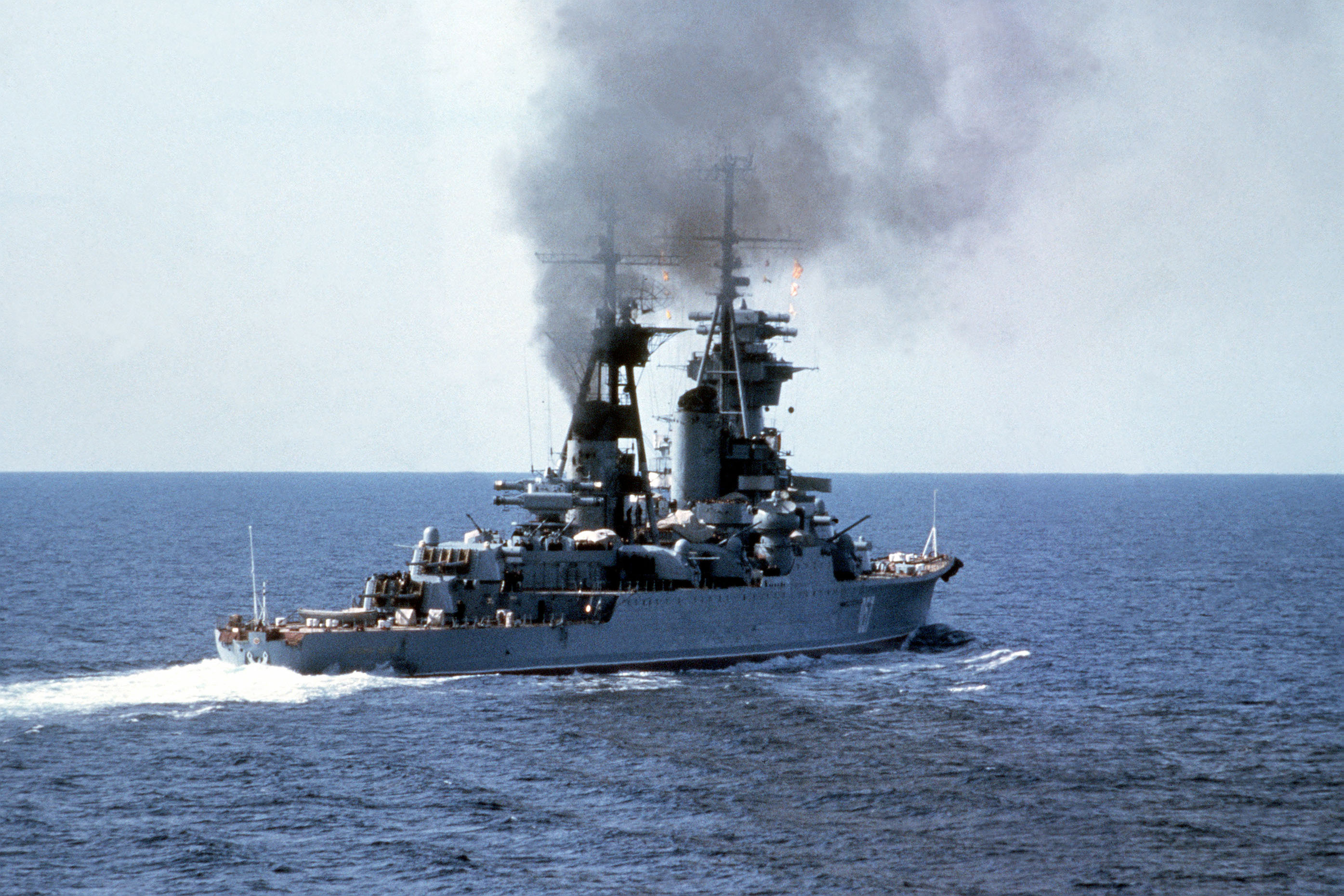
- Aleksandr Nevsky in 1983

History

Soviet Union
- Name: Aleksandr Nevsky; (Александр Невский)
- Namesake: Alexander Nevsky
- Ordered: 1 December 1948
- Builder: Admiralty Shipyard, Leningrad
- Yard number: 625
- Laid down: 30 May 1950
- Launched: 7 June 1951
- Commissioned: 31 December 1952
- Recommissioned: 15 December 1970
- Decommissioned: 30 May 1989
- Stricken: 31 December 1989
- Identification: See Pennant numbers
- Fate: Scrapped, 1991

General characteristics
- Class & type: Sverdlov-class cruiser
- Displacement: 13,600 tonnes (13,385 long tons) standard; 16,640 tonnes (16,377 long tons) full load
- Length: 210 m (689 ft 0 in) overall; 205 m (672 ft 7 in) waterline
- Beam: 22 m (72 ft 2 in)
- Draught: 6.9 m (22 ft 8 in)
- Propulsion: 2 × shaft geared steam turbines; 6 × boilers, 110,000 hp (82,000 kW)
- Speed: 32.5 knots (60.2 km/h; 37.4 mph)
- Range: 9,000 nmi (17,000 km; 10,000 mi) at 18 knots (33 km/h; 21 mph)
- Complement: 1,250
- Armament: 4 × triple 15.2 cm (6.0 in)/57 cal B-38 guns in Mk5-bis turrets; 6 × twin 10 cm (3.9 in)/56 cal Model 1934 guns in SM-5-1 mounts; 16 × twin 3.7 cm (1.5 in) AA guns in V-11M mounts; 2 × quintuple 533 mm (21.0 in) torpedo tubes in PTA-53-68-bis mounts
- Armour: Belt: 100 mm (3.9 in); Conning tower: 150 mm (5.9 in); Deck: 50 mm (2.0 in); Turrets: 175 mm (6.9 in) front, 65 mm (2.6 in) sides, 60 mm (2.4 in) rear, 75 mm (3.0 in) roof; Barbettes: 130 mm (5.1 in); Bulkheads: 100–120 mm (3.9–4.7 in)

Aleksandr Nevsky was a Sverdlov-class cruiser of the Soviet Navy.

== Development and design ==
The Sverdlov-class cruisers, Soviet designation Project 68bis, were the last conventional gun cruisers built for the Soviet Navy. They were built in the 1950s and were based on Soviet, German, and Italian designs and concepts developed prior to the Second World War. They were modified to improve their sea keeping capabilities, allowing them to run at high speed in the rough waters of the North Atlantic. The basic hull was more modern and had better armor protection than the vast majority of the post Second World War gun cruiser designs built and deployed by peer nations. They also carried an extensive suite of modern radar equipment and anti-aircraft artillery. The Soviets originally planned to build 40 ships in the class, which would be supported by the Stalingrad-class battlecruisers and aircraft carriers.

The Sverdlov class displaced 13,600 tons standard and 16,640 tons at full load. They were 210 metres (689 ft 0 in) long overall and 205 metres (672 ft 7 in) long at the waterline. They had a beam of 22 metres (72 ft 2 in) and draught of 6.9 metres (22 ft 8 in) and typically had a complement of 1,250. The hull was a completely welded new design and the ships had a double bottom for over 75% of their length. The ship also had twenty-three watertight bulkheads. The Sverdlovs had six boilers providing steam to two shaft geared steam turbines generating 118,100 shaft horsepower (88,100 kW). This gave the ships a maximum speed of 32.5 knots (60.2 km/h; 37.4 mph). The cruisers had a range of 9,000 nautical miles (17,000 km; 10,000 mi) at 18 knots (33 km/h; 21 mph).

Sverdlov-class cruisers main armament included twelve 152 mm (6 in)/57 cal B-38 guns mounted in four triple Mk5-bis turrets. They also had twelve 100 mm (3.9 in)/56 cal Model 1934 guns in six twin SM-5-1 mounts. For anti-aircraft weaponry, the cruisers had thirty-two 37 mm (1.5 in) anti-aircraft guns in sixteen twin mounts and were also equipped with ten 533 mm (21 in) torpedo tubes in two mountings of five each.

The Sverdlovs had 100 mm (3.9 in) belt armor and had a 50 mm (2.0 in) armored deck. The turrets were shielded by 175 mm (6.9 in) armor and the conning tower, by 150 mm (5.9 in) armor.

The cruisers' ultimate radar suite included one 'Big Net' or 'Top Trough' air search radar, one 'High Sieve' or 'Low Sieve' air search radar, one 'Knife Rest' air search radar and one 'Slim Net' air search radar. For navigational radar they had one 'Don-2' or 'Neptune' model. For fire control purposes the ships were equipped with two 'Sun Visor' radars, two 'Top Bow' 152 mm gun radars and eight 'Egg Cup' gun radars. For electronic countermeasures the ships were equipped with two 'Watch Dog' ECM systems.

== Construction and career ==
The ship was built at Admiralty Shipyard in Leningrad and was launched on 30 May 1950 and commissioned on 31 December 1952. From 1956 to 1962 she was part of the 2nd Cruiser Division in the Northern Fleet. In February 1962, the light cruiser Aleksandr Nevsky was assigned to the newly formed 6th (Missile) Surface Ship Division.

On 15 February 1953, she was commissioned into the Red Banner Northern Fleet. In May 1953, she made the transition to Leningrad, where she took part in festivities in honor of the 250th anniversary of the city.

In 1954-1956, the cruiser practiced combat training tasks at sea and at the base, completing a number of cruises in the Arctic Ocean as part of a ship formation. On 31 March 1956, together with the cruisers Murmansk and Oktyabrskaya Revolyutsiya, it became part of the newly formed 2nd Cruiser Division.

In the summer of 1957, she made the transition from the Baltic Sea to Leningrad, where she took part in the celebration of the Day of the Navy. In the fall of 1957, the cruiser returned to Leningrad again in connection with scheduled repairs and modernization. After the repairs carried out at the Shipyard No. 194, she, on 7 November 1957, represented the Red Banner Northern Fleet during the naval parade on the Neva dedicated to the 40th anniversary of the October Revolution.

On 25 December 1964, decommissioned from the Navy, mothballed and put in the Kola Bay, in Sayda-Guba. In 1968, the cruiser was taken out of storage and towed to Murmansk (ROSTA) to the plant for repair and recommissioning.

On 15 December 1970, she was recommissioned.

In 1971, the ship received board number 813.

In 1988, she starred in the film Operation Wunderland based on the real life operation during World War II and played as the fictional German cruiser Admiral Steiner (real name, Admiral Scheer).

On 30 May 1989, she was disarmed and decommissioned from the navy.

On 31 December 1989, she was struck and transferred to the Department of Funds and Property (Отдел фондов и имущества - OFI) for dismantling and implementation.

From 1 January 1990, the crew of the Aleksandr Nevsky began to be removed. By the fall of 1990, 6 officers remained.

In 1991, the ship was motheballed.

In October 1991, the cruiser under the tug Dikson, was towed around the southern coast of Africa to India. The final dismantling took place in Alan Beach (near Bombay).

=== Pennant numbers ===
Date	Pennant number
1953	2
	65
1957	30
1961	150
	201
1971	813
1972	812
1974	805
	868
	066
	097
1981	077
1982	057
1986	077
1989	067

== See also ==
- Cruiser
- Sverdlov-class cruiser
- List of ships of the Soviet Navy
- List of ships of Russia by project number
