= Soviet cruiser Aleksandr Suvorov =

Soviet Sverdlov-class cruiser

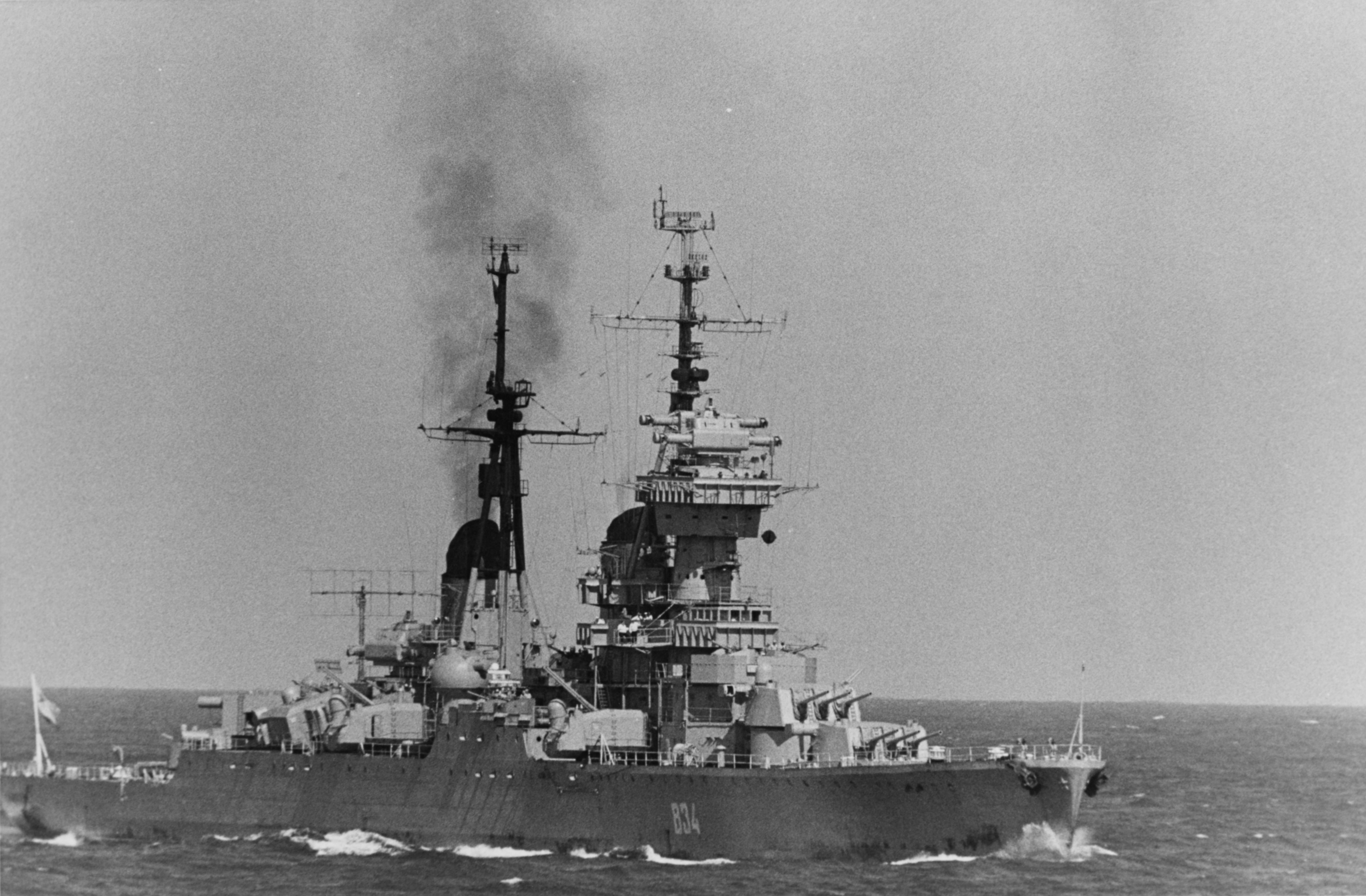
- Aleksandr Suvorov in April 1970

History

Soviet Union
- Name: Aleksandr Suvorov; (Александр Суворов)
- Namesake: Alexander Suvorov
- Ordered: 31 August 1950
- Builder: Baltic Shipyard, Leningrad
- Yard number: 436
- Laid down: 29 September 1951
- Launched: 15 May 1952
- Commissioned: 31 December 1953
- Decommissioned: 15 December 1989
- Stricken: 19 April 1990
- Identification: See Pennant numbers
- Fate: Scrapped, 1991

General characteristics
- Class & type: Sverdlov-class cruiser
- Displacement: 13,600 tonnes (13,385 long tons) standard; 16,640 tonnes (16,377 long tons) full load
- Length: 210 m (689 ft 0 in) overall; 205 m (672 ft 7 in) waterline
- Beam: 22 m (72 ft 2 in)
- Draught: 6.9 m (22 ft 8 in)
- Propulsion: 2 × shaft geared steam turbines; 6 × boilers, 110,000 hp (82,000 kW)
- Speed: 32.5 knots (60.2 km/h; 37.4 mph)
- Range: 9,000 nmi (17,000 km; 10,000 mi) at 18 knots (33 km/h; 21 mph)
- Complement: 1,250
- Armament: 4 × triple 15.2 cm (6.0 in)/57 cal B-38 guns in Mk5-bis turrets; 6 × twin 10 cm (3.9 in)/56 cal Model 1934 guns in SM-5-1 mounts; 16 × twin 3.7 cm (1.5 in) AA guns in V-11M mounts; 2 × quintuple 533 mm (21.0 in) torpedo tubes in PTA-53-68-bis mounts
- Armour: Belt: 100 mm (3.9 in); Conning tower: 150 mm (5.9 in); Deck: 50 mm (2.0 in); Turrets: 175 mm (6.9 in) front, 65 mm (2.6 in) sides, 60 mm (2.4 in) rear, 75 mm (3.0 in) roof; Barbettes: 130 mm (5.1 in); Bulkheads: 100–120 mm (3.9–4.7 in)

Aleksandr Suvorov was a Sverdlov-class cruiser of Soviet Navy.

== Development and design ==
The Sverdlov-class cruisers, Soviet designation Project 68bis, were the last conventional gun cruisers built for the Soviet Navy. They were built in the 1950s and were based on Soviet, German, and Italian designs and concepts developed prior to the Second World War. They were modified to improve their sea keeping capabilities, allowing them to run at high speed in the rough waters of the North Atlantic. The basic hull was more modern and had better armor protection than the vast majority of the post Second World War gun cruiser designs built and deployed by peer nations. They also carried an extensive suite of modern radar equipment and anti-aircraft artillery. The Soviets originally planned to build 40 ships in the class, which would be supported by the Stalingrad-class battlecruisers and aircraft carriers.

The Sverdlov class displaced 13,600 tons standard and 16,640 tons at full load. They were 210 metres (689 ft 0 in) long overall and 205 metres (672 ft 7 in) long at the waterline. They had a beam of 22 metres (72 ft 2 in) and draught of 6.9 metres (22 ft 8 in) and typically had a complement of 1,250. The hull was a completely welded new design and the ships had a double bottom for over 75% of their length. The ship also had twenty-three watertight bulkheads. The Sverdlovs had six boilers providing steam to two shaft geared steam turbines generating 118,100 shaft horsepower (88,100 kW). This gave the ships a maximum speed of 32.5 knots (60.2 km/h; 37.4 mph). The cruisers had a range of 9,000 nautical miles (17,000 km; 10,000 mi) at 18 knots (33 km/h; 21 mph).

Sverdlov-class cruisers main armament included twelve 152 mm (6 in)/57 cal B-38 guns mounted in four triple Mk5-bis turrets. They also had twelve 100 mm (3.9 in)/56 cal Model 1934 guns in six twin SM-5-1 mounts. For anti-aircraft weaponry, the cruisers had thirty-two 37 mm (1.5 in) anti-aircraft guns in sixteen twin mounts and were also equipped with ten 533 mm (21 in) torpedo tubes in two mountings of five each.

The Sverdlovs had 100 mm (3.9 in) belt armor and had a 50 mm (2.0 in) armored deck. The turrets were shielded by 175 mm (6.9 in) armor and the conning tower, by 150 mm (5.9 in) armor.

The cruisers' ultimate radar suite included one 'Big Net' or 'Top Trough' air search radar, one 'High Sieve' or 'Low Sieve' air search radar, one 'Knife Rest' air search radar and one 'Slim Net' air search radar. For navigational radar they had one 'Don-2' or 'Neptune' model. For fire control purposes the ships were equipped with two 'Sun Visor' radars, two 'Top Bow' 152 mm gun radars and eight 'Egg Cup' gun radars. For electronic countermeasures the ships were equipped with two 'Watch Dog' ECM systems.

== Construction and career ==
Aleksandr Suvorov was laid down on 29 September 1951 at Baltic Shipyard, Leningrad and launched on 15 May 1952. The vessel was commissioned on 31 December 1953. On 18 February 1954, she entered the 8th Navy. From 12 to 17 October 1955, the cruiser visited to Portsmouth, United Kingdom. On 24 December 1955, she was transferred to the DKBF. On 27 February 1956, the vessel was transferred to the KSF.

From 26–31 May 1981, Aleksandr Suvorov visited Aden, Yemen. On 1 December 1986, the cruiser was decommissioned from the Navy, mothballed and laid up. On 15 December 1989, the vessel was ordered disarmed and on 19 April 1990 she was stricken. In November 1991, Aleksandr Suvorov was sold to a private Indian firm for scrap in India.

=== Pennant numbers ===
| Date | Pennant number |
|---|---|
| 1954 | 53 |
| | 20 |
| 1956 | 45 |
| | 632 |
| 1969 | 834 |
| | 140 |
| | 831 |
| 1980 | 016 |
| 1982 | 033 |
| 1984 | 015 |
| 1986 | 035 |

== Gallery ==
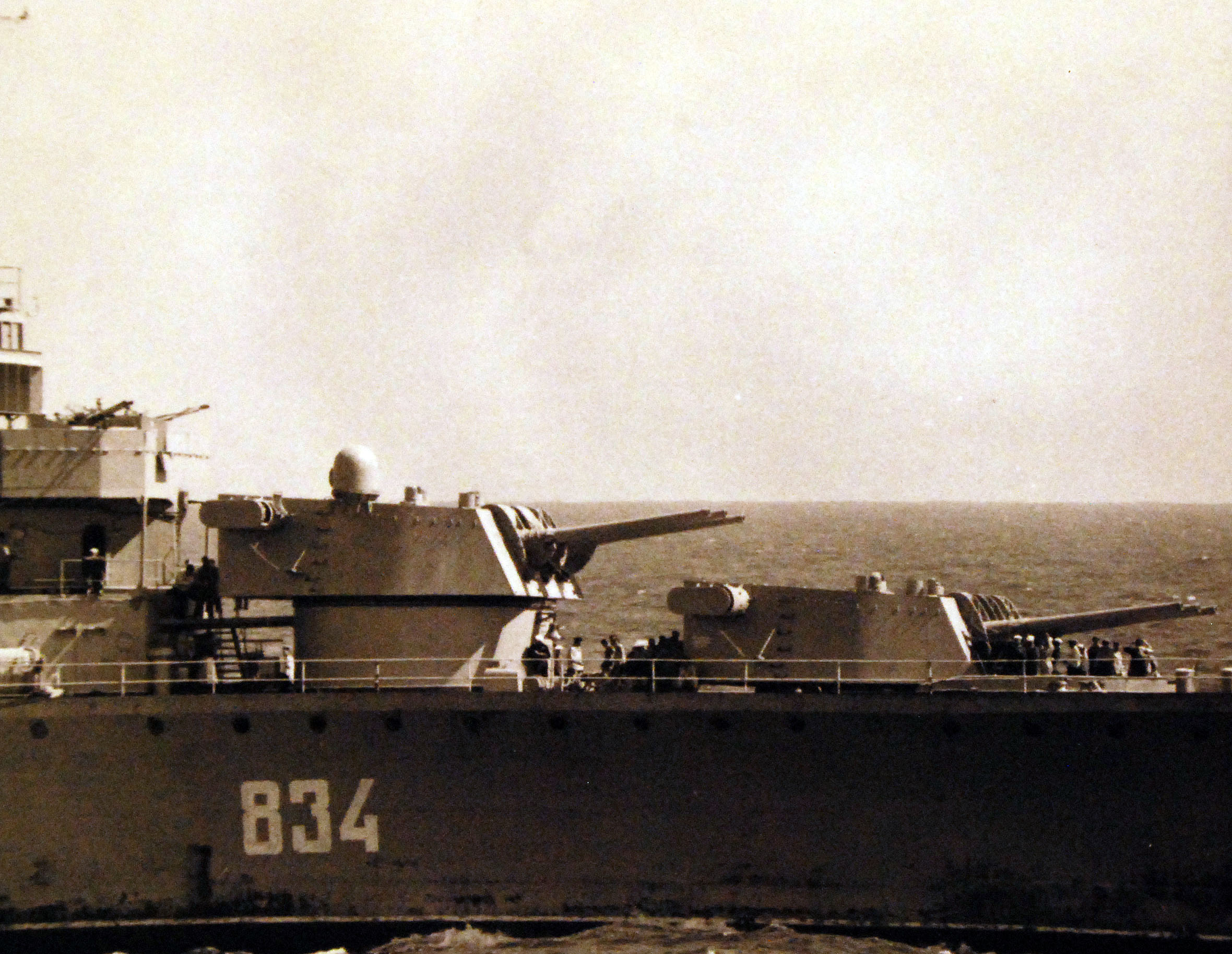
Aleksandr Suvorov in April 1970

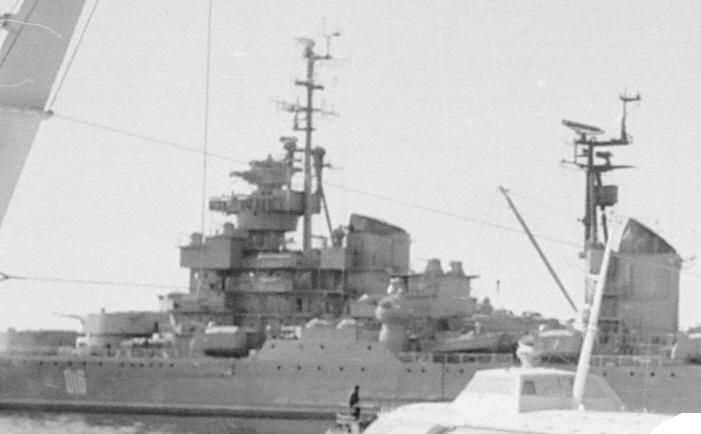
Aleksandr Suvorov in 1980

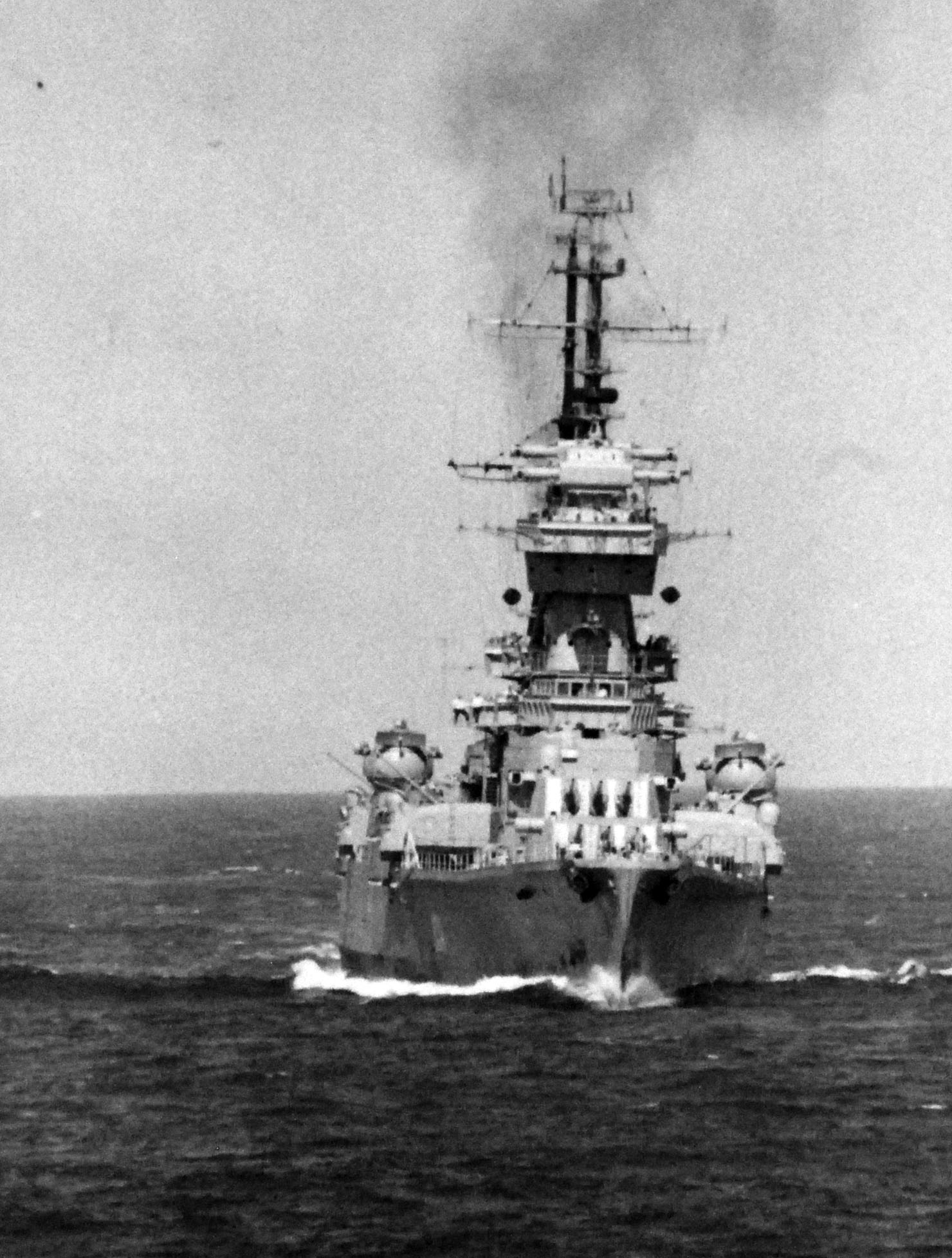
