= Soviet cruiser Molotovsk =

Soviet Sverdlov-class cruiser

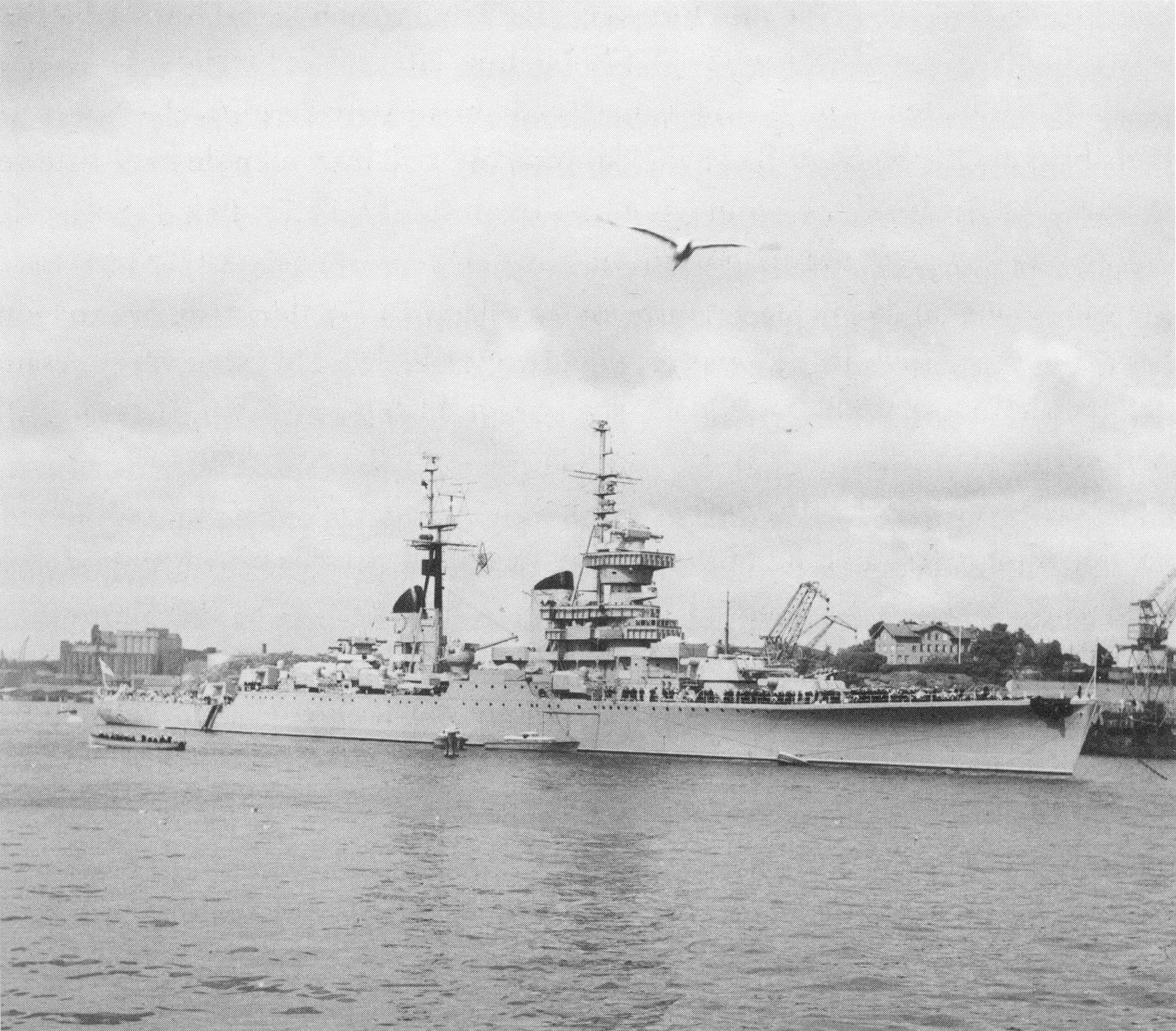
- Molotovsk on 4 August 1956

History

Soviet Union
- Name: Molotovsk; (Молотовск)
- Renamed: Oktyabrskaya Revolutsiya; (Октябрьская революция)
- Namesake: Molotovsk; October Revolution
- Ordered: 1 December 1948
- Builder: Sevmash, Severodvinsk
- Yard number: 301
- Laid down: 15 July 1952
- Launched: 29 June 1951
- Commissioned: 27 March 1953
- Recommissioned: 29 April 1966
- Decommissioned: 16 September 1987
- Stricken: 11 February 1988
- Identification: See Pennant numbers
- Fate: Scrapped, 1988

General characteristics
- Class & type: Sverdlov-class cruiser
- Displacement: 13,600 tonnes (13,385 long tons) standard; 16,640 tonnes (16,377 long tons) full load
- Length: 210 m (689 ft 0 in) overall; 205 m (672 ft 7 in) waterline
- Beam: 22 m (72 ft 2 in)
- Draught: 6.9 m (22 ft 8 in)
- Propulsion: 2 × shaft geared steam turbines; 6 × boilers, 110,000 hp (82,000 kW)
- Speed: 32.5 knots (60.2 km/h; 37.4 mph)
- Range: 9,000 nmi (17,000 km; 10,000 mi) at 18 knots (33 km/h; 21 mph)
- Complement: 1,250
- Armament: 4 × triple 15.2 cm (6.0 in)/57 cal B-38 guns in Mk5-bis turrets; 6 × twin 10 cm (3.9 in)/56 cal Model 1934 guns in SM-5-1 mounts; 16 × twin 3.7 cm (1.5 in) AA guns in V-11M mounts; 2 × quintuple 533 mm (21.0 in) torpedo tubes in PTA-53-68-bis mounts
- Armour: Belt: 100 mm (3.9 in); Conning tower: 150 mm (5.9 in); Deck: 50 mm (2.0 in); Turrets: 175 mm (6.9 in) front, 65 mm (2.6 in) sides, 60 mm (2.4 in) rear, 75 mm (3.0 in) roof; Barbettes: 130 mm (5.1 in); Bulkheads: 100–120 mm (3.9–4.7 in)

Molotovsk was a Sverdlov-class cruiser of the Soviet Navy which was later renamed Oktyabrskaya Revolutsiya.

== Development and design ==
The Sverdlov-class cruisers, Soviet designation Project 68bis, were the last conventional gun cruisers built for the Soviet Navy. They were built in the 1950s and were based on Soviet, German, and Italian designs and concepts developed prior to the Second World War. They were modified to improve their sea keeping capabilities, allowing them to run at high speed in the rough waters of the North Atlantic. The basic hull was more modern and had better armor protection than the vast majority of the post Second World War gun cruiser designs built and deployed by peer nations. They also carried an extensive suite of modern radar equipment and anti-aircraft artillery. The Soviets originally planned to build 40 ships in the class, which would be supported by the Stalingrad-class battlecruisers and aircraft carriers.

The Sverdlov class displaced 13,600 tons standard and 16,640 tons at full load. They were 210 metres (689 ft 0 in) long overall and 205 metres (672 ft 7 in) long at the waterline. They had a beam of 22 metres (72 ft 2 in) and draught of 6.9 metres (22 ft 8 in) and typically had a complement of 1,250. The hull was a completely welded new design and the ships had a double bottom for over 75% of their length. The ship also had twenty-three watertight bulkheads. The Sverdlovs had six boilers providing steam to two shaft geared steam turbines generating 118,100 shaft horsepower (88,100 kW). This gave the ships a maximum speed of 32.5 knots (60.2 km/h; 37.4 mph). The cruisers had a range of 9,000 nautical miles (17,000 km; 10,000 mi) at 18 knots (33 km/h; 21 mph).

Sverdlov-class cruisers main armament included twelve 152 mm (6 in)/57 cal B-38 guns mounted in four triple Mk5-bis turrets. They also had twelve 100 mm (3.9 in)/56 cal Model 1934 guns in six twin SM-5-1 mounts. For anti-aircraft weaponry, the cruisers had thirty-two 37 mm (1.5 in) anti-aircraft guns in sixteen twin mounts and were also equipped with ten 533 mm (21 in) torpedo tubes in two mountings of five each.

The Sverdlovs had 100 mm (3.9 in) belt armor and had a 50 mm (2.0 in) armored deck. The turrets were shielded by 175 mm (6.9 in) armor and the conning tower, by 150 mm (5.9 in) armor.

The cruisers' ultimate radar suite included one 'Big Net' or 'Top Trough' air search radar, one 'High Sieve' or 'Low Sieve' air search radar, one 'Knife Rest' air search radar and one 'Slim Net' air search radar. For navigational radar they had one 'Don-2' or 'Neptune' model. For fire control purposes the ships were equipped with two 'Sun Visor' radars, two 'Top Bow' 152 mm gun radars and eight 'Egg Cup' gun radars. For electronic countermeasures the ships were equipped with two 'Watch Dog' ECM systems.

== Construction and career ==
The ship was built at Sevmash in Severodvinsk and was launched on 29 June 1951 and commissioned on 27 March 1953.

On 18 February 1954, she joined the Northern Fleet as Molotovsk.

From 3 to 7 August 1956, she visited Oslo. From 8 to 12 August, she visited to Gothenburg. On 3 August 1957, she was renamed Oktyabrskaya Revolutsiya.

From 30 August to 2 September 1958, she visited Bergen. From 8 to 12 September, she visited Copenhagen.

On 16 December 1960, she was transferred to the Baltic Fleet.

On 27 March 1961, she was decommissioned from the Navy, mothballed and put on hold in Kronstadt.

On 29 April 1966, she was reactivated and put into operation.

In 1967, she visited Port Said.

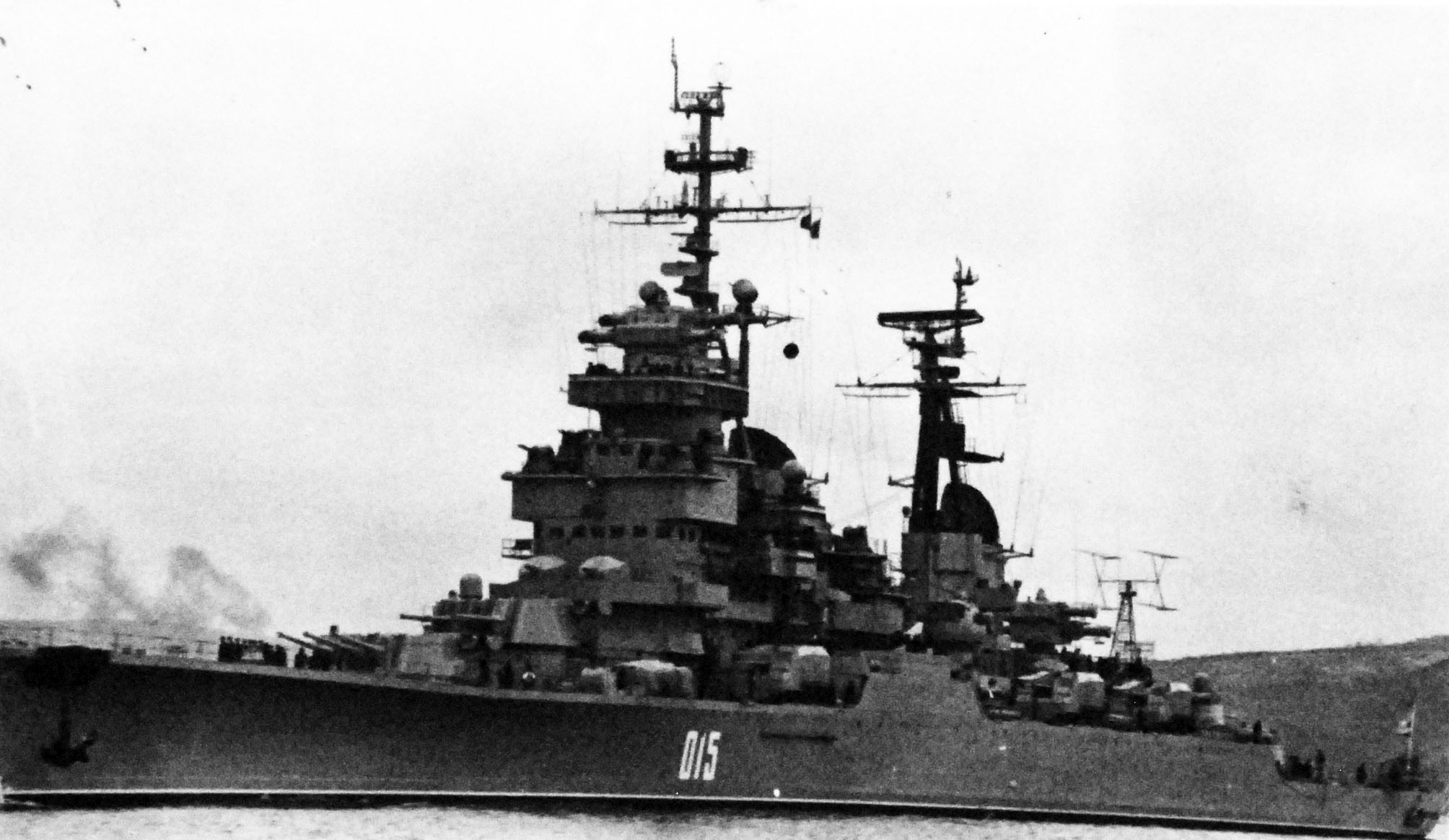
Oktyabrskaya Revolutsiya on 1977

On 16 November 1968 to 25 December 1969, she was modernized at Kronstadt according to Project 68A.

From 8 to 13 May 1970, she visited Cherbourg.

From 17 to 23 July 1970 and 25 September to 1 October 1972, she took part in the war zone to carry out a combat mission to provide assistance to the Syrian armed forces.

From 17 May to 25 June 1971, 5 to 8 July and 8 to 12 September 1972, she again performed a combat mission to provide assistance to the armed forces of Egypt. From 17 to 22 August 1971, she visited Copenhagen.

From 20 to 24 July 1978, she visited Gdynia. From 8 to 10 October, she visited Rostock.

From 4 to 9 October 1979, she visited Rostock.

From 27 to 30 July 1980, she visited Gdynia.

From 9 to 14 August 1982, she visited Rostock.

On 16 September 1987, she was disarmed and decommissioned from the navy.

On 11 February 1988, she was struck by the navy.

From 1988 to 1990, she was scrapped at the Glavvtorchermet base in Leningrad.

=== Pennant numbers ===
Date	Pennant number
1957	22
1958	4
	6
1960	202
	842
	891
1967	118
1970	846
1971	899
1972	890
1974	020
1976	015
1977	892
1978	844
1978	141
1980	154
1986	194
1987	154

== See also ==
- Cruiser
- Sverdlov-class cruiser
- List of ships of the Soviet Navy
- List of ships of Russia by project number
