= Soviet cruiser Dzerzhinsky =

Soviet Sverdlov-class cruiser

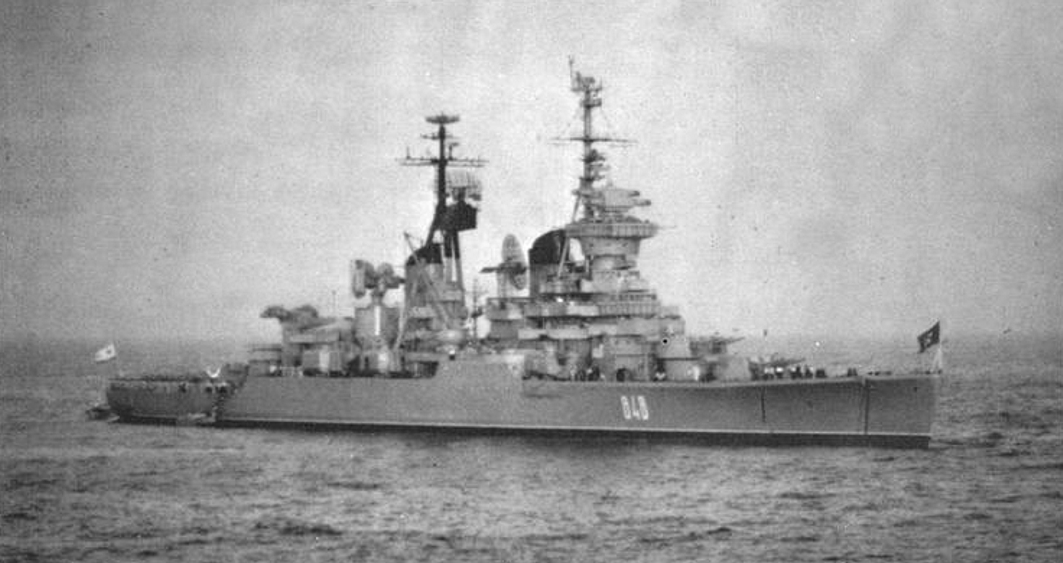
- Dzerzhinsky in 1971

History

Soviet Union
- Name: Dzerzhinsky; (Дзержинский)
- Namesake: Felix Dzerzhinsky
- Ordered: 3 December 1947
- Builder: Black Sea Shipyard, Mykolaiv
- Yard number: 374
- Laid down: 21 December 1948
- Launched: 31 August 1950
- Commissioned: 18 August 1952
- Decommissioned: 19 February 1980
- Stricken: 12 October 1988
- Identification: See Pennant numbers
- Fate: Scrapped

General characteristics
- Class & type: Sverdlov-class cruiser
- Displacement: 13,600 tonnes (13,385 long tons) standard; 16,640 tonnes (16,377 long tons) full load
- Length: 210 m (689 ft 0 in) overall; 205 m (672 ft 7 in) waterline
- Beam: 22 m (72 ft 2 in)
- Draught: 6.9 m (22 ft 8 in)
- Propulsion: 2 × shaft geared steam turbines; 6 × boilers, 110,000 hp (82,000 kW)
- Speed: 32.5 knots (60.2 km/h; 37.4 mph)
- Range: 9,000 nmi (17,000 km; 10,000 mi) at 18 knots (33 km/h; 21 mph)
- Complement: 1,250
- Armament: 4 × triple 15.2 cm (6.0 in)/57 cal B-38 guns in Mk5-bis turrets; 6 × twin 10 cm (3.9 in)/56 cal Model 1934 guns in SM-5-1 mounts; 16 × twin 3.7 cm (1.5 in) AA guns in V-11M mounts; 2 × quintuple 533 mm (21.0 in) torpedo tubes in PTA-53-68-bis mounts
- Armour: Belt: 100 mm (3.9 in); Conning tower: 150 mm (5.9 in); Deck: 50 mm (2.0 in); Turrets: 175 mm (6.9 in) front, 65 mm (2.6 in) sides, 60 mm (2.4 in) rear, 75 mm (3.0 in) roof; Barbettes: 130 mm (5.1 in); Bulkheads: 100–120 mm (3.9–4.7 in)

Dzerzhinsky was a Sverdlov-class cruiser of the Soviet Navy.

== Development and design ==
The Sverdlov-class cruisers, Soviet designation Project 68bis, were the last conventional gun cruisers built for the Soviet Navy. They were built in the 1950s and were based on Soviet, German, and Italian designs and concepts developed prior to the Second World War. They were modified to improve their sea keeping capabilities, allowing them to run at high speed in the rough waters of the North Atlantic. The basic hull was more modern and had better armor protection than the vast majority of the post Second World War gun cruiser designs built and deployed by peer nations. They also carried an extensive suite of modern radar equipment and anti-aircraft artillery. The Soviets originally planned to build 40 ships in the class, which would be supported by the Stalingrad-class battlecruisers and aircraft carriers.

The Sverdlov class displaced 13,600 tons standard and 16,640 tons at full load. They were 210 metres (689 ft 0 in) long overall and 205 metres (672 ft 7 in) long at the waterline. They had a beam of 22 metres (72 ft 2 in) and draught of 6.9 metres (22 ft 8 in) and typically had a complement of 1,250. The hull was a completely welded new design and the ships had a double bottom for over 75% of their length. The ship also had twenty-three watertight bulkheads. The Sverdlovs had six boilers providing steam to two shaft geared steam turbines generating 118,100 shaft horsepower (88,100 kW). This gave the ships a maximum speed of 32.5 knots (60.2 km/h; 37.4 mph). The cruisers had a range of 9,000 nautical miles (17,000 km; 10,000 mi) at 18 knots (33 km/h; 21 mph).

Sverdlov-class cruisers main armament included twelve 152 mm (6 in)/57 cal B-38 guns mounted in four triple Mk5-bis turrets. They also had twelve 100 mm (3.9 in)/56 cal Model 1934 guns in six twin SM-5-1 mounts. For anti-aircraft weaponry, the cruisers had thirty-two 37 mm (1.5 in) anti-aircraft guns in sixteen twin mounts and were also equipped with ten 533 mm (21 in) torpedo tubes in two mountings of five each.

The Sverdlovs had 100 mm (3.9 in) belt armor and had a 50 mm (2.0 in) armored deck. The turrets were shielded by 175 mm (6.9 in) armor and the conning tower, by 150 mm (5.9 in) armor.

The cruisers' ultimate radar suite included one 'Big Net' or 'Top Trough' air search radar, one 'High Sieve' or 'Low Sieve' air search radar, one 'Knife Rest' air search radar and one 'Slim Net' air search radar. For navigational radar they had one 'Don-2' or 'Neptune' model. For fire control purposes the ships were equipped with two 'Sun Visor' radars, two 'Top Bow' 152 mm gun radars and eight 'Egg Cup' gun radars. For electronic countermeasures the ships were equipped with two 'Watch Dog' ECM systems.

== Construction and career ==
The ship was built at the Black Sea Shipyard in Mykolaiv and was launched on 31 August 1950 and commissioned on 18 August 1952.

On 30 August 1952, she became a member of the Red Banner Black Sea Fleet. By the end of 1955, on the basis of the pre-design study, the design bureau determined the optimal option: the placement of the M-2 anti-aircraft missile system launcher in the place of the removable main-caliber rear tower (number 3) with the simultaneous rearrangement of the shell cellar of this tower for the missile storage. The changes in the ship were confirmed by the necessary stability and unsinkability calculations. In February 1956, the Commander-in-Chief of the Navy approved the TT assignment for the 70E project. From 15 October 1957 to 24 December 1958, she was modernized and rebuilt at Sevmorzavod in Sevastopol according to the Project 70E. Chief designer of the project K. I. Troshkov. In the process of re-equipment on the ship, the following were removed: the third tower, the aft rangefinder post, eight 37 mm V-11 guns and torpedo armament. Instead, they installed: one experimental M-2 air defense system with a stabilized SM-64 launcher, a cellar for 10 V-753 missiles, a Corvette control system and a Kaktus and Razliv radar. To build the cellar, three decks were cut and a 3.3 m (11 ft) high superstructure was erected.

On 3 August 1961, she was reclassified as a training ship. From 20 to 26 August 1964, she visited to Constanța.

In April 1967, visited to Split. From 10 to 14 July, she visited to Port Said. From 5 to 30 June 1967 and from 5 to 24 October 1973, while in the war zone, she carried out a combat mission to provide assistance to the Egyptian Armed Forces (Six-Day War and Yom Kippur War).

From 9 to 12 August 1969, she visited to Varna. In October 1969, she visited to Alexandria. From 26 to 30 April 1971, she visited to Le Havre. From 14 to 18 December 1971, she visited to Latakia.

In March 1976, she visited to Tartus and in April 1976, she visited to Split. From 30 June to 4 July 1977, she visited to Tunisia. From 20 to 25 October 1978, she visited to Piraeus. From 16 to 20 November 1978, she visited to Istanbul.

On 19 February 1980, she was decommissioned from the Navy, mothballed and put on hold in Sevastopol. On 12 October 1988, she was disarmed and stricken from the Navy. On 9 December 1988, her crew was disbanded and transferred to OFI for dismantling and implementation.

=== Pennant numbers ===
Date	Pennant number
1953	11
1954	37
1956	12
	107
1958	516
1965	195
1967	145
1967	630
1969	159
1970	542
1970	846
1970	849
1971	847
1971	849
1971	856
1974	854
1976	850
1977	855
1977	859
1978	195
1979	106
	104
1980	101
1987	106
	045
	848
	858

== See also ==
- List of ships of the Soviet Navy
- List of ships of Russia by project number
