= Indonesian cruiser Irian =

Sverdlov class cruiser

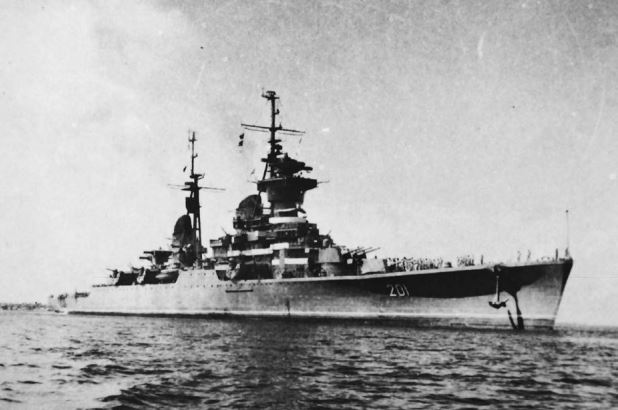
- RI Irian (201)

History

Soviet Union
- Name: Ordzhonikidze; (Орджоникидзе)
- Namesake: Sergo Ordzhonikidze
- Builder: Admiralty Shipyard, Leningrad
- Yard number: 600
- Laid down: 19 October 1949
- Launched: 17 September 1950
- Commissioned: 18 August 1952
- Decommissioned: 24 January 1963
- Identification: See Pennant numbers
- Fate: Sold to Indonesia in 1962

Indonesia
- Name: Irian
- Namesake: Irian Barat
- Acquired: 1962
- Commissioned: 24 January 1963
- Out of service: 1970
- Identification: 201
- Fate: Put on a disposal list in 1972

General characteristics
- Class & type: Sverdlov-class cruiser
- Displacement: 13,600 tonnes (13,385 long tons) standard; 16,640 tonnes (16,377 long tons) full load
- Length: 210 m (689 ft 0 in) overall; 205 m (672 ft 7 in) waterline
- Beam: 22 m (72 ft 2 in)
- Draught: 6.9 m (22 ft 8 in)
- Propulsion: 2 × shaft geared steam turbines; 6 × boilers, 110,000 hp (82,000 kW)
- Speed: 32.5 knots (60.2 km/h; 37.4 mph)
- Range: 9,000 nmi (17,000 km; 10,000 mi) at 18 knots (33 km/h; 21 mph)
- Complement: 1,250
- Sensors & processing systems: Rif surface-search radar; Gyuys-2 air-search radar; 2 × Neptun navigation radars; 2 × Fakel-MZ; 2 × Fakel-MO IFF; RPN-47-0; Tamir-5N sonar; Solntce-1
- Armament: 4 × triple 15.2 cm (6.0 in)/57 cal B-38 guns in Mk5-bis turrets; 6 × twin 10 cm (3.9 in)/56 cal Model 1934 guns in SM-5-1 mounts; 16 × twin 3.7 cm (1.5 in) AA guns in V-11M mounts; 2 × quintuple 533 mm (21.0 in) torpedo tubes in PTA-53-68-bis mounts
- Armour: Belt: 100 mm (3.9 in); Conning tower: 150 mm (5.9 in); Deck: 50 mm (2.0 in); Turrets: 175 mm (6.9 in) front, 65 mm (2.6 in) sides, 60 mm (2.4 in) rear, 75 mm (3.0 in) roof; Barbettes: 130 mm (5.1 in); Bulkheads: 100–120 mm (3.9–4.7 in)
- Aviation facilities: Helipad

RI Irian (201), previously named Ordzhonikidze (Russian: Орджоникидзе) was a Sverdlov-class cruiser, Soviet designation "Project 68bis", of the Soviet Navy that was acquired by Indonesian Navy in 1962.

== Development and design ==
The Sverdlov-class cruisers, Soviet designation Project 68bis, were the last conventional gun cruisers built for the Soviet Navy. They were built in the 1950s and were based on Soviet, German, and Italian designs and concepts developed prior to the Second World War. They were modified to improve their sea keeping capabilities, allowing them to run at high speed in the rough waters of the North Atlantic. The basic hull was more modern and had better armor protection than the vast majority of the post Second World War gun cruiser designs built and deployed by peer nations. They also carried an extensive suite of modern radar equipment and anti-aircraft artillery. The Soviets originally planned to build 40 ships in the class, which would be supported by the Stalingrad-class battlecruisers and aircraft carriers.

The Sverdlov class displaced 13,600 tons standard and 16,640 tons at full load. They were 210 metres (689 ft 0 in) long overall and 205 metres (672 ft 7 in) long at the waterline. They had a beam of 22 metres (72 ft 2 in) and draught of 6.9 metres (22 ft 8 in) and typically had a complement of 1,250. The hull was a completely welded new design and the ships had a double bottom for over 75% of their length. The ship also had twenty-three watertight bulkheads. The Sverdlovs had six boilers providing steam to two shaft geared steam turbines generating 118,100 shaft horsepower (88,100 kW). This gave the ships a maximum speed of 32.5 knots (60.2 km/h; 37.4 mph). The cruisers had a range of 9,000 nautical miles (17,000 km; 10,000 mi) at 18 knots (33 km/h; 21 mph).

Sverdlov-class cruisers main armament included twelve 152 mm (6 in)/57 cal B-38 guns mounted in four triple Mk5-bis turrets. They also had twelve 100 mm (3.9 in)/56 cal Model 1934 guns in six twin SM-5-1 mounts. For anti-aircraft weaponry, the cruisers had thirty-two 37 mm (1.5 in) anti-aircraft guns in sixteen twin mounts and were also equipped with ten 533 mm (21 in) torpedo tubes in two mountings of five each.

The Sverdlovs had 100 mm (3.9 in) belt armor and had a 50 mm (2.0 in) armored deck. The turrets were shielded by 175 mm (6.9 in) armor and the conning tower, by 150 mm (5.9 in) armor.

The cruisers' ultimate radar suite included one 'Big Net' or 'Top Trough' air search radar, one 'High Sieve' or 'Low Sieve' air search radar, one 'Knife Rest' air search radar and one 'Slim Net' air search radar. For navigational radar they had one 'Don-2' or 'Neptune' model. For fire control purposes the ships were equipped with two 'Sun Visor' radars, two 'Top Bow' 152 mm gun radars and eight 'Egg Cup' gun radars. For electronic countermeasures the ships were equipped with two 'Watch Dog' ECM systems.

== Operational history ==
=== Ordzhonikidze ===
In April 1956 the ship docked at Portsmouth; aboard were Nikita Khrushchev and Nikolai Bulganin. Former Royal Navy diver Lionel Crabb was recruited to observe the Ordzhonikidze but went missing.

After a deal to sell the ship to China fell through due to the Sino-Soviet Split, Ordzhonikidze was sold to Indonesia in 1962.

=== Irian ===
RI Irian arrived in Surabaya in October 1962 and was officially decommissioned from service by the Soviet Navy on 24 January 1963. After her acceptance into the Indonesian Navy, Soviet naval personnel assisted with training the ship's crew, but the vessel's complexity posed a problem for fleet deployments. In November 1963, six of her boilers suffered major damage while underway. Irian returned to the Soviet Union for extensive repairs in 1964, returning to Surabaya in August of that year.

In the mid-1960s, following the abortive coup by the 30 September Movement and the subsequent transition from President Sukarno to President Suharto, ties between Eastern Bloc countries and Suharto's New Order regime promptly deteriorated, leading to the flow of spare parts for the ship being cut.

The cost of supporting the large cruiser and an acute lack of spare parts effectively prevented its use in further Indonesian fleet activities. By 1967, Irian was immobilized, serving for a time as a prison ship. During a storm in 1970, the ship was severely damaged through flooding and was beached, eventually being sold for scrap in 1972.

=== Pennant numbers ===
Date	Pennant number
1953	18
1954	45
1956	21
1958	53
1959	310
	355
1961	743
1962	435

== Bibliography ==
- Gardiner, Robert; Chumbley, Stephen, eds. (1995). Conway's All the World's Fighting Ships 1947–1995. Annapolis, Maryland, USA: Naval Institute Press. ISBN 1-55750-132-7.
- Muraviev, Alexey; Brown, Colin (December 2008). "Strategic Realignment or Déjà vu? Russia-Indonesia Defence Cooperation in the Twenty-First Century". SCDC Working Papers (411): 42.
