= Soviet cruiser Murmansk (1955) =

Soviet Sverdlov-class cruiser

Coordinates: 70°38′09.65″N 21°57′26.11″E

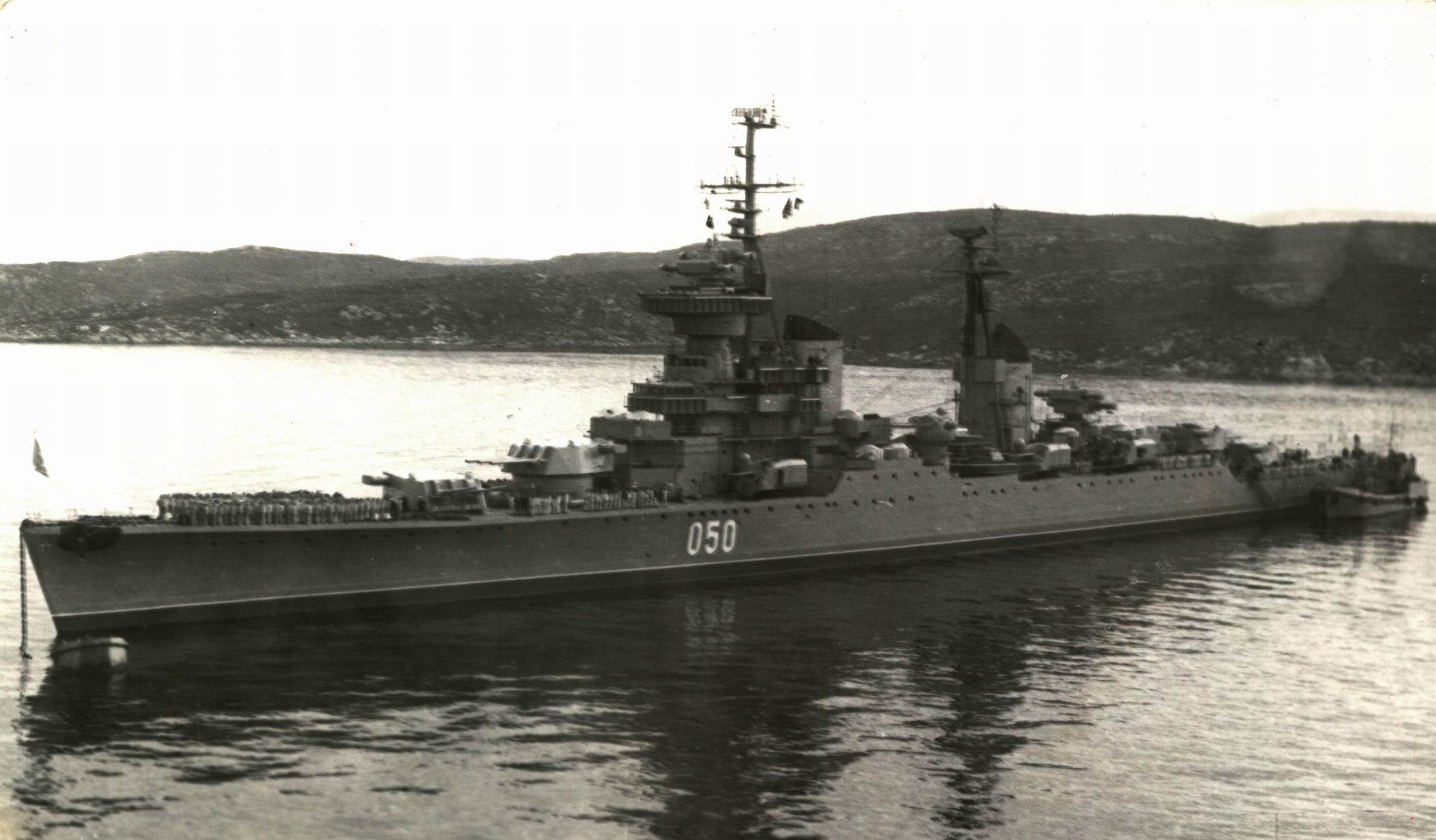
- Murmansk in 1978

History

Russia
- Name: Murmansk
- Namesake: Murmansk
- Builder: Shipyard 402, Severodvinsk
- Yard number: 302
- Laid down: 28 January 1953
- Launched: 24 April 1955
- Commissioned: 22 September 1955
- Decommissioned: 3 July 1992
- Stricken: 1994
- Identification: See Pennant numbers
- Fate: Scrapped, 2013

General characteristics
- Class & type: Sverdlov-class cruiser
- Displacement: 13,600 tonnes (13,385 long tons) standard; 16,640 tonnes (16,377 long tons) full load
- Length: 210 m (689 ft 0 in) overall; 205 m (672 ft 7 in) waterline
- Beam: 22 m (72 ft 2 in)
- Draught: 6.9 m (22 ft 8 in)
- Propulsion: 2 × shaft geared steam turbines; 6 × boilers, 110,000 hp (82,000 kW)
- Speed: 32.5 knots (60.2 km/h; 37.4 mph)
- Range: 9,000 nmi (17,000 km; 10,000 mi) at 18 knots (33 km/h; 21 mph)
- Complement: 1,250
- Sensors & processing systems: MR-302 Rubka air/surface-search radar; MR-510 Kil-U air-search radar; Kristall-K radar
- Armament: 4 × triple 15.2 cm (6.0 in)/57 cal B-38 guns in Mk5-bis turrets; 6 × twin 10 cm (3.9 in)/56 cal Model 1934 guns in SM-5-1 mounts; 16 × twin 3.7 cm (1.5 in) AA guns in V-11M mounts; 2 × quintuple 533 mm (21.0 in) torpedo tubes in PTA-53-68-bis mounts
- Armour: Belt: 100 mm (3.9 in); Conning tower: 150 mm (5.9 in); Deck: 50 mm (2.0 in); Turrets: 175 mm (6.9 in) front, 65 mm (2.6 in) sides, 60 mm (2.4 in) rear, 75 mm (3.0 in) roof; Barbettes: 130 mm (5.1 in); Bulkheads: 100–120 mm (3.9–4.7 in)

Murmansk (Russian: Мурманск) was a light cruiser project no. 68-bis (designated the Sverdlov class by NATO) of the Soviet and later the Russian Navy's Northern Fleet.

== Development and design ==
The Sverdlov-class cruisers, Soviet designation Project 68bis, were the last conventional gun cruisers built for the Soviet Navy. They were built in the 1950s and were based on Soviet, German, and Italian designs and concepts developed prior to the Second World War. They were modified to improve their sea keeping capabilities, allowing them to run at high speed in the rough waters of the North Atlantic. The basic hull was more modern and had better armor protection than the vast majority of the post Second World War gun cruiser designs built and deployed by peer nations. They also carried an extensive suite of modern radar equipment and anti-aircraft artillery. The Soviets originally planned to build 40 ships in the class, which would be supported by the Stalingrad-class battlecruisers and aircraft carriers.

The Sverdlov class displaced 13,600 tons standard and 16,640 tons at full load. They were 210 metres (689 ft 0 in) long overall and 205 metres (672 ft 7 in) long at the waterline. They had a beam of 22 metres (72 ft 2 in) and draught of 6.9 metres (22 ft 8 in) and typically had a complement of 1,250. The hull was a completely welded new design and the ships had a double bottom for over 75% of their length. The ship also had twenty-three watertight bulkheads. The Sverdlovs had six boilers providing steam to two shaft geared steam turbines generating 118,100 shaft horsepower (88,100 kW). This gave the ships a maximum speed of 32.5 knots (60.2 km/h; 37.4 mph). The cruisers had a range of 9,000 nautical miles (17,000 km; 10,000 mi) at 18 knots (33 km/h; 21 mph).

Sverdlov-class cruisers main armament included twelve 152 mm (6 in)/57 cal B-38 guns mounted in four triple Mk5-bis turrets. They also had twelve 100 mm (3.9 in)/56 cal Model 1934 guns in six twin SM-5-1 mounts. For anti-aircraft weaponry, the cruisers had thirty-two 37 mm (1.5 in) anti-aircraft guns in sixteen twin mounts and were also equipped with ten 533 mm (21 in) torpedo tubes in two mountings of five each.

The Sverdlovs had 100 mm (3.9 in) belt armor and had a 50 mm (2.0 in) armored deck. The turrets were shielded by 175 mm (6.9 in) armor and the conning tower, by 150 mm (5.9 in) armor.

The cruisers' ultimate radar suite included one 'Big Net' or 'Top Trough' air search radar, one 'High Sieve' or 'Low Sieve' air search radar, one 'Knife Rest' air search radar and one 'Slim Net' air search radar. For navigational radar they had one 'Don-2' or 'Neptune' model. For fire control purposes the ships were equipped with two 'Sun Visor' radars, two 'Top Bow' 152 mm gun radars and eight 'Egg Cup' gun radars. For electronic countermeasures the ships were equipped with two 'Watch Dog' ECM systems.

== Construction and career ==
She was laid down in Severodvinsk in 1953 and commissioned on 22 September 1955. Murmansk joined the 2nd Cruiser Division on the division's formation in 1956.

== Scrapping, sinking and demolition ==
In 1994 Murmansk was sold to India for scrapping but ran aground off the Norwegian village of Sørvær during the transfer. During that time, a photo was taken by a native Norwegian that had shown the ship in almost perfect condition with a massive list. It was first estimated that the winter storms would destroy parts of Murmansk above the water, but the ship remained in one piece and in 2009 funding was allocated to pay for the dismantling of the vessel.

In 2008 organizations Veolia and Bellona announced that they had found a "source of radioactivity", which unrolled a wave of panic among local residents, who started to find "increased incidence of cancer". It was later confirmed as luminescent paint on some indicators and switches, with content of isotopes so small that it has no biologic impact. The ship however contained a number of other toxic substances such as remains of fuel, PCB, and asbestos.

Since the ship was in a very bad state when the decision to remove it was made, there was no possibility to tow it. Scandinavia's largest demolition contractor, AF Decom, constructed a massive breakwater and cofferdam around Murmansk to access the shipwreck from land and demolish it where it rested. The cofferdam around the wreck was sealed in April 2012. By mid-May the dock was almost empty of water and the demolition of the cruiser began. The project was completed in 2013.

=== Pennant numbers ===
Date	Pennant number
1956	52
	88
1963	154
1964	120
	150
	805
1968	818
1971	803
1973	806
	820
1978	816
1978	050
1981	074
	020
1987	057

== Gallery ==
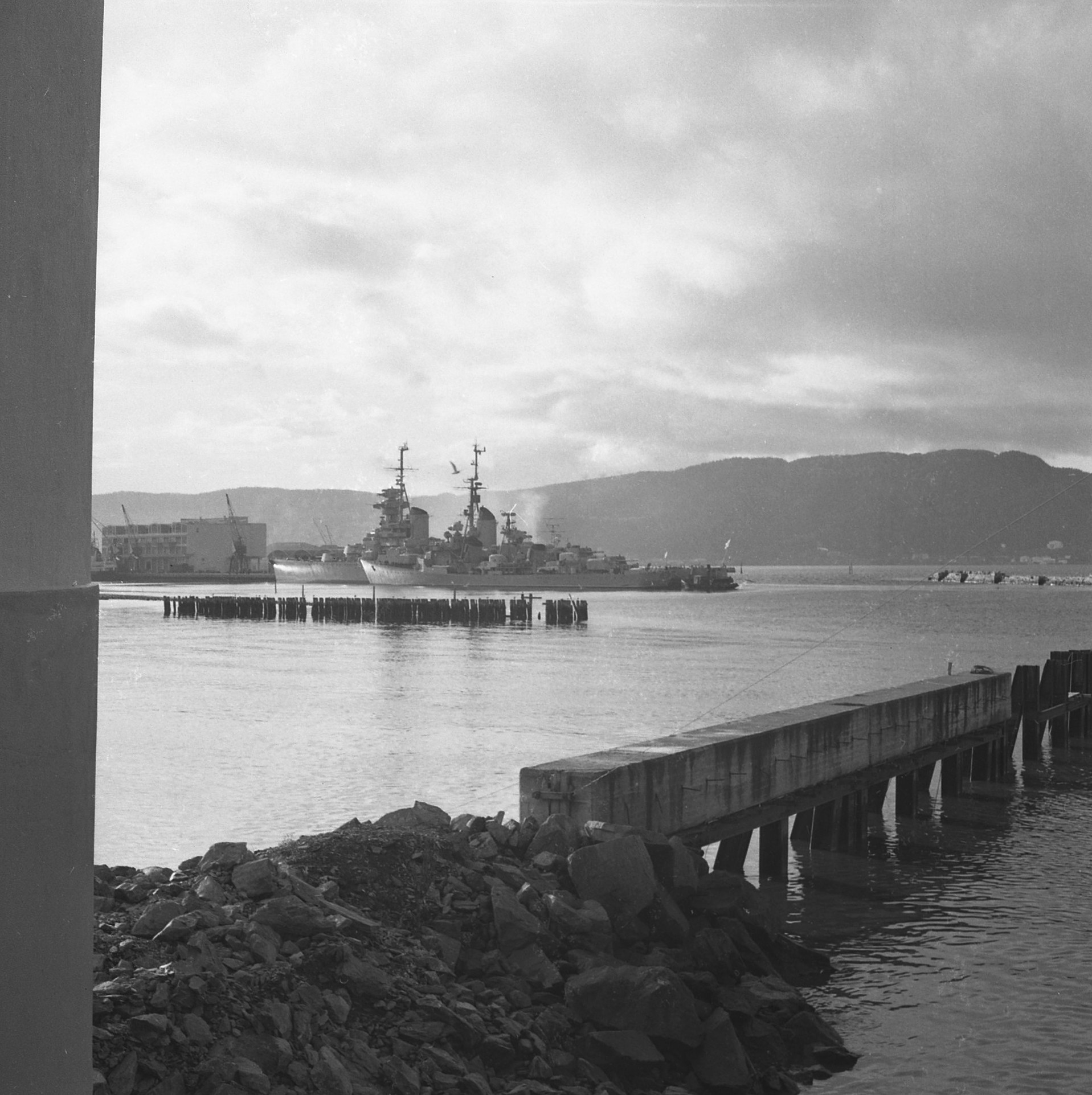
Murmansk in 1964

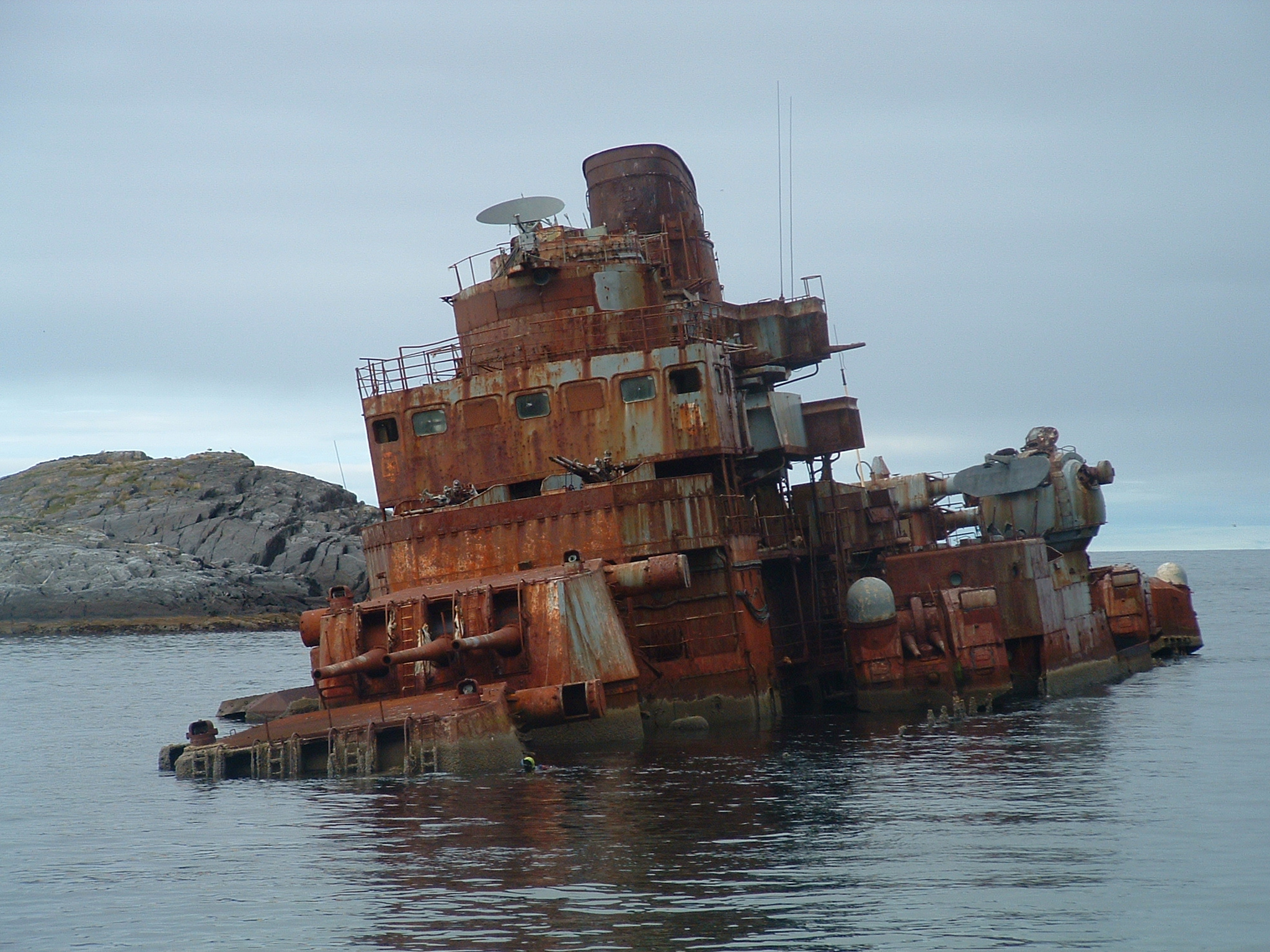
Wrecked Murmansk on 6 January 2002

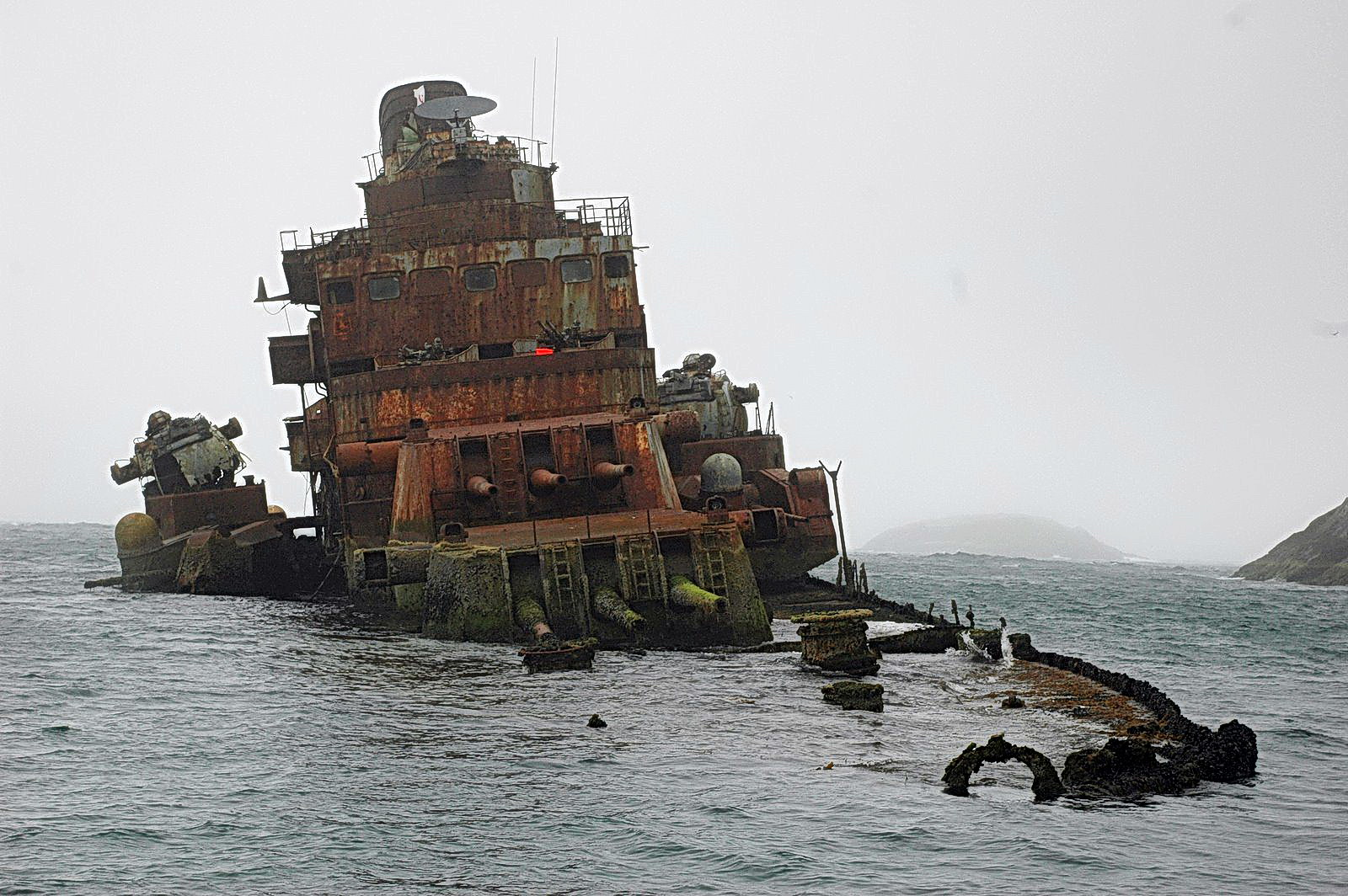
