= Sverdlov-class cruiser =

1950s cruiser class of the Soviet Navy

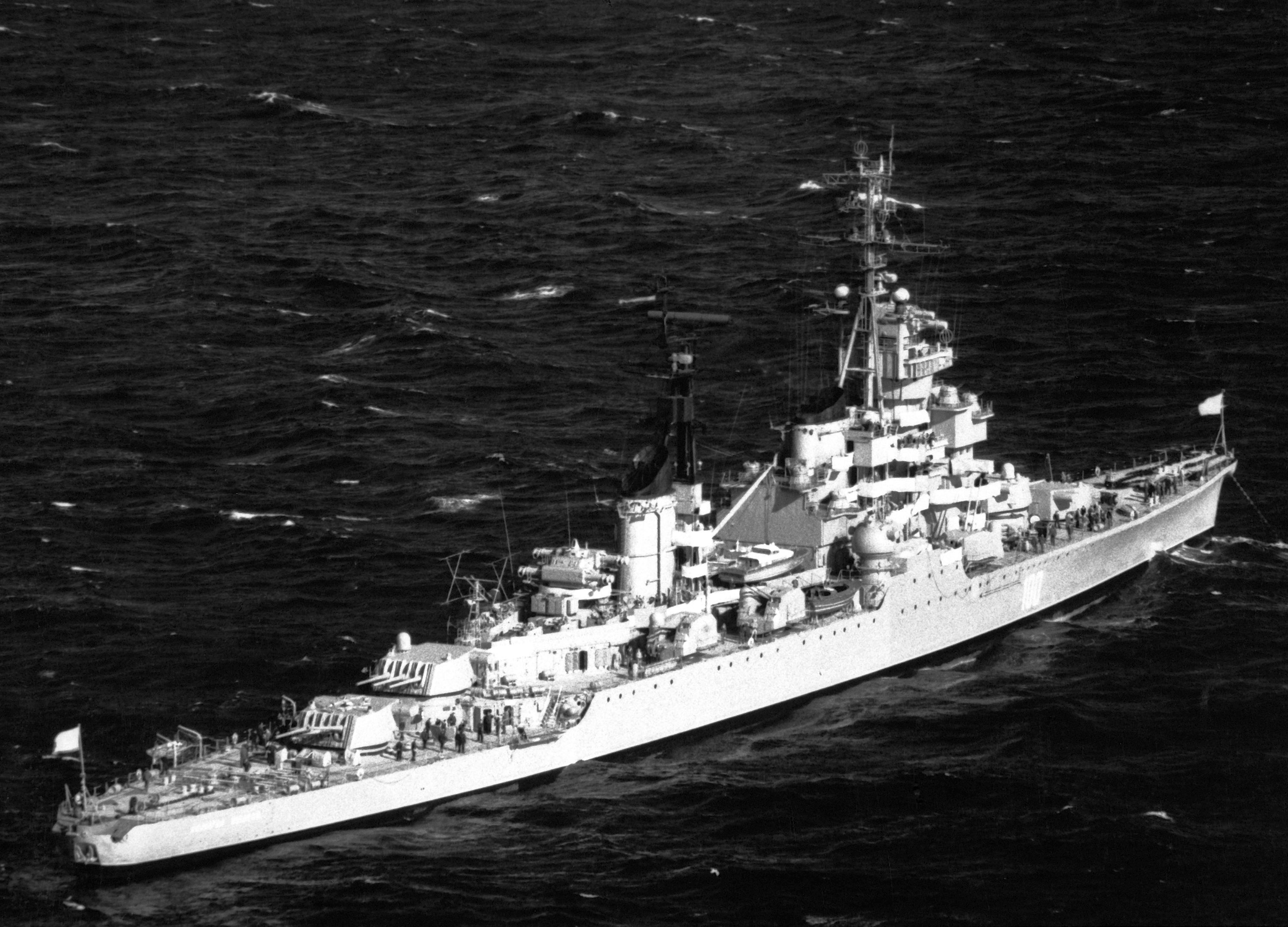
- Admiral Ushakov in 1981

Class overview
- Name: Sverdlov class
- Builders: Baltic Shipyard, Leningrad; Nikolayev Shipyard, Mykolaiv; Admiralty Shipyard, Leningrad; Severodvinsk Shipyard, Severodvinsk
- Operators: Soviet Navy; Russian Navy; Indonesian Navy
- Preceded by: Chapayev class
- Succeeded by: Kynda class
- Built: 1948–1959
- In commission: 1952–1992
- Planned: 30
- Completed: 14
- Canceled: 16
- Retired: 13
- Preserved: 1; Mikhail Kutuzov

General characteristics
- Type: Cruiser
- Displacement: 13,600 tonnes (13,385 long tons) standard; 16,640 tonnes (16,377 long tons) full load
- Length: 210 m (689 ft 0 in) overall; 205 m (672 ft 7 in) waterline
- Beam: 22 m (72 ft 2 in)
- Draught: 6.9 m (22 ft 8 in)
- Propulsion: 2 × shaft geared steam turbines; 6 × boilers, 110,000 hp (82,000 kW)
- Speed: 32.5 knots (60.2 km/h; 37.4 mph)
- Range: 9,000 nmi (17,000 km; 10,000 mi) at 18 knots (33 km/h; 21 mph)
- Complement: 1,250
- Armament: 4 × triple 15.2 cm (6.0 in)/57 cal B-38 guns in Mk5-bis turrets; 6 × twin 10 cm (3.9 in)/56 cal Model 1934 guns in SM-5-1 mounts; 16 × twin 3.7 cm (1.5 in) AA guns in V-11M mounts; 2 × quintuple 533 mm (21.0 in) torpedo tubes in PTA-53-68-bis mounts
- Armor: Belt: 100 mm (3.9 in); Conning tower: 150 mm (5.9 in); Deck: 50 mm (2.0 in); Turrets: 175 mm (6.9 in) front, 65 mm (2.6 in) sides, 60 mm (2.4 in) rear, 75 mm (3.0 in) roof; Barbettes: 130 mm (5.1 in); Bulkheads: 100–120 mm (3.9–4.7 in)

The Sverdlov-class cruisers, Soviet designation Project 68bis, were the last conventional gun cruisers built for the Soviet Navy. They were built in the 1950s and were based on Soviet, German, and Italian designs and concepts developed before the Second World War. They were modified to improve their sea capabilities, allowing them to operate at high speeds in the rough waters of the North Atlantic. The design carried an extensive suite of modern radar equipment and anti-aircraft artillery, which made an approach by existing aircraft within 5,000 yards (4,600 m) extremely dangerous.

The Sverdlov design was part of a post-WWII fleet concept that also included the Stalingrad-class battlecruisers and aircraft carriers that would transform the Soviet Navy into one able to field a first-class fleet for deep water operations. The entire concept was considered obsolete by anyone outside the Soviet Navy, but it retained the support of Joseph Stalin and construction program continued to move forward. The Sverdlov was launched in July 1950, by which time a large number of sister ships were under construction, followed by the Stalingrads construction beginning in November 1951.

The introduction of the Sverdlovs was cause for great concern in the Royal Navy. They were faced with the Soviets deploying a large fleet of modern ships against their northern units, possibly overwhelming them. This produced the "Sverdlov Crisis" as various solutions to the problem were proposed. In the short term, the RN retained several big-gun ships like HMS Vanguard, but the long-term solution was to develop new weapons. This ultimately emerged as the Blackburn Buccaneer, a carrier-based strike aircraft that had the performance required to approach and attack Sverdlov-class ships at ultra-low level.

The fleet concept had never been widely supported in the Soviet Union, and ended abruptly with Stalin's death in 1953. By this time fourteen of the planned forty ships in the class had been completed. Two additional hulls were scrapped on the slip, and four partially complete ships launched in 1954 were scrapped in 1959. Sverdlov class ships remained in service through the 1970s, during which they underwent a limited modernization program before finally leaving service in the late 1980s. The only remaining ship of the class, Mikhail Kutuzov, is preserved in Novorossiysk as a museum ship.

== Design concept ==
Stalin, along with the leadership of the Soviet Navy, wanted a ship that followed a naval doctrine focused on three priorities:

- supporting the defense of the Soviet coastline,
- operating out of naval bases worldwide, and
- protecting Soviet Arctic, Baltic, Mediterranean and Black Sea interests.

Secondary missions envisioned for this class of ship were commerce raiding and political presence in the Third World, but they were considered obsolete for the missile age (in which defensive and anti-submarine resources were the priority) by Soviet Premier Nikita Khrushchev and the General Staff, who grudgingly conceded only some cruisers for limited roles as flagships in strategic and tactical naval operations. Within the Soviet Navy in 1959, leading admirals still believed that more big cruisers would be helpful in the sort of operations planned in Cuba and in support of Indonesia.

The big ship threat to the Royal Navy was useful to it in justifying maintaining a conventional fleet of warships and aircraft carriers, especially for use in the North Atlantic. The response was to introduce the Blackburn Buccaneer, a carrier-based strike aircraft that had the performance required to approach and attack Sverdlov-class ships at ultra-low level, using toss bombing attacks to deliver nuclear ordnance, while remaining outside the 5 km effective range of the Soviet 100 mm (3.9 in) and 37 mm (1.5 in) guns. Additionally, the threat of these Soviet cruisers led the Royal Navy to keep its last battleship, HMS Vanguard, in commission until 1960, with the four King George V-class battleships kept in reserve until 1956 for similar reasons, as these five battleships were considered a surefire stopgap that would neutralise the threat of Soviet cruisers should aircraft prove insufficient in the frequently cloudy and stormy weather and long periods of seasonal darkness of the North Atlantic and Arctic Oceans.

When the building program was cut back, and the battlecruisers and carriers were cancelled, the Sverdlovs were left dangerously unprotected when operating in areas outside the cover of land-based aircraft. Their secondary mission, operating on their own as commerce raiders, was also compromised as they would be extremely vulnerable, in good weather, to USN carrier battle groups equipped with modern strike aircraft and to the remaining Baltimore- and Des Moines-class cruisers equipped with 8-inch guns. The Royal Navy's last Fiji- and Tiger-class gun cruisers, and the USN's Gearing- and Forrest Sherman-class destroyers, lacked the armour, range and speed required to counter the Sverdlovs.

== History ==
At the end of the Second World War, Joseph Stalin planned a major modernization and expansion of the Soviet Navy to turn it into a global blue-water navy. Large numbers of cruisers were required to escort heavier ships and leading destroyers. To speed up production, it was decided to build an improved version of the pre-war Chapayev-class cruiser (Project 68), the Sverdlov (Project 68B) instead of a wholly new design (Project 65). The design for the Sverdlov class was formally approved on 27 May 1947. Some sources state that 30 Sverdlovs were initially planned, with the order being cut by five in favor of the three Stalingrad-class battlecruisers, but others state that the total of 30 includes the five Chapayevs. The first three ships of the class were named after canceled ships of the Chapayev class. Following the death of Stalin in 1953, this order was cut to 21. Once the first 15 hulls were laid down, the Soviet Navy decided that the remaining six ships would be completed to a modified design (Project 68zif) with provisions for protection against nuclear fallout, but none was completed. Plans were developed, and drawings were created to upgrade the ships to support a cruise missile capability; however, these plans were dropped, and new construction was canceled in 1959. Incomplete ships except Admiral Kornilov (which became a hulk) were scrapped by 1961.

Reductions in cruiser force levels were contrary to the views of Soviet Navy leadership, which insisted cruisers still provided a valuable capability to act as command ships for naval gunfire support of amphibious operations. They also thought they would provide a political presence in contested areas of the Third World, e.g. Cuba and Indonesia. Had more Sverdlovs been available at the time of the Cuban Missile Crisis in 1962, they would certainly have been deployed. The Soviet Navy intended to base several older Chapayev class cruisers at Cuban ports had the operation succeeded.

These ships were outclassed as surface combatants due to their lack of an anti-ship cruise missile capability. The limited modernization of those ships still in service in the 1970s relegated them to benefit as naval gunfire support platforms.

The standard Soviet practice was to pass the cruisers in and out of reserve status. Most were relegated to reserve status by the early 1980s.

== Design ==
The Sverdlov-class cruisers were improved and slightly enlarged versions of the Chapayev class. They had the same main armament, machinery, and side protection as the earlier ships. Improvements included increased fuel capacity for more range, an all-welded hull, improved underwater security, and increased anti-aircraft artillery and radar.

The Sverdlov class displaced 13,600 tons standard and 16,640 tons at full load. They were 210 m (690 ft) long overall and 205 m (673 ft) long at the waterline. They had a beam of 22 m (72 ft) and draft of 6.9 m (23 ft) and typically had a complement of 1,250. The hull was a completely welded new design, and the ships had a double bottom for over 75% of their length. The ship also had 23 watertight bulkheads. The Sverdlovs had six boilers providing steam to two geared steam turbines generating 118,100 shaft horsepower (88,100 kW) to their shafts. This gave the ships a maximum speed of 32.5 knots (60.2 km/h; 37.4 mph). The cruisers had a range of 9,000 nautical miles (17,000 km; 10,000 mi) at 18 knots (33 km/h; 21 mph).

Sverdlov-class cruisers' main armament included twelve 152 mm (6 in)/57 caliber B-38 guns mounted in four triple Mk5-bis turrets. They also had twelve 100 mm (4 in)/56 cal Model 1934 guns in six twin SM-5-1 mounts. For anti-aircraft weaponry, the cruisers had thirty-two 37 mm (1.5 in) anti-aircraft guns in sixteen twin mounts and were also equipped with ten 533 mm (21 in) torpedo tubes in two mountings of five each.

The Sverdlovs had 100 mm (4 in) belt armor and had a 50 mm (2 in) armored deck. The turrets were shielded by 175 mm (7 in) armor and the conning tower by 150 mm (5.9 in) armor.

The cruisers' ultimate radar suite included one 'Big Net' or 'Top Trough' air search radar, one 'High Sieve' or 'Low Sieve' air search radar, one 'Knife Rest' air search radar, and one 'Slim Net' air search radar. For navigational radar, they had one 'Don-2' or 'Neptune' model. For fire control purposes, the ships were equipped with two 'Sun Visor' radars, two 'Top Bow' 152 mm gun radars, and eight 'Egg Cup' gun radars. For electronic countermeasures, the ships were equipped with two 'Watch Dog' ECM systems.

=== Modifications ===
By the early 1960s, torpedo tubes were removed from all ships of the class. In 1957 the Admiral Nakhimov had a KSShch (NATO reporting name: SS-N-1 "Scrubber") anti-ship missile launcher installed to replace "A" and "B" turrets. The modification was designated Project 68ER. This trial installation was unsuccessful, and the ship was decommissioned and used as a target ship in 1961.

Dzerzhinsky had a surface-to-air missile (SAM) launcher for the M-2 Volkhov-M missile (SA-N-2 "Guideline"), which replaced the third or "X" main gun turret in 1960–62, with the designation Project 70E. This conversion was also considered to be unsuccessful and no further ships were converted. As the entire missile installation was above the armored deck and the missile itself, based on the S-75 Dvina (SA-2 "Guideline"), was liquid-fueled (acid/kerosene), it would have represented a serious hazard to the ship in action.

Zhdanov and Senyavin were converted to command ships in 1971 by replacing the "X" turret with extra accommodation and electronics, four twin 30 mm AK-230 guns, and a 4K33 "Osa-M" (SA-N-4 "Gecko") SAM system. Senyavin also had the "Y" turret removed to make room for a helicopter deck and hangar, and four additional AK-230 mounts installed atop the Osa-M missile system. Zhdanov and Senyavin were respectively designated Project 68U1 and Project 68U2.

Oktyabrskaya Revolyutsia was refitted with an enlarged bridge in 1977, with Admiral Ushakov and Aleksandr Suvorov receiving the same modification in 1979, and later, Mikhail Kutusov. These ships had four of their 37 mm twin mounts removed, and eight 30 mm AK-230 mounts were added. These ships were designated Project 68A.

== Ships ==
Sverdlov-class cruisers (Project 68bis)
Name	Russian name	Builder	Laid down	Launched	Completed	Fate	Notes
Sverdlov	Свердлов	Baltic Shipyard, Leningrad	15 October 1949	5 July 1950	15 May 1952	Stricken 1989	Named after Yakov Sverdlov. On 14 February 1978, she was relegated to the reserve and stationed at Liepaya. On 30 May 1989, she was decommissioned and, in 1990, towed to Kronshtadt. In early 1991, she was sold to an Indian company for scrap, and in October 1993 towed to India and scrapped.
Zhdanov	Жданов	Baltic Shipyard, Leningrad	11 February 1950	27 December 1950	31 December 1952	Stricken 1991	Named after Andrei Zhdanov. She was converted into a command ship with the "X" turret removed, replaced by office space, and extra electronics added. She was then scrapped in 1991.
Admiral Ushakov	Адмирал Ушаков	Baltic Shipyard, Leningrad	31 August 1950	29 September 1951	8 September 1953	Stricken 1987	Named after Fyodor Fyodorovich Ushakov. Scrapped 1987
Aleksandr Suvorov	Александр Суворов	Baltic Shipyard, Leningrad	26 February 1951	15 May 1952	31 December 1953	Stricken 1990	Named after Russian general Alexander Suvorov. Scrapped 1990.
Admiral Senyavin	Адмирал Сенявин	Baltic Shipyard, Leningrad	31 October 1951	22 December 1952	30 November 1954	Stricken 1991	Named after Dmitry Senyavin. Converted into a command ship with aft turrets removed and replaced by a helicopter hangar and office space, Scrapped in 1991
Dmitry Pozharsky	Дмитрий Пожарский	Baltic Shipyard, Leningrad	31 March 1952	25 June 1953	31 December 1954	To reserve 1979.	Named after patriot Dmitry Pozharsky. Stricken 1987. Sold for scrap 1990.
Kronstadt	Кронштадт	Baltic Shipyard, Leningrad	October 1953	11 September 1954	—N/a	Broken up, 1961	Named after the city of Kronstadt
Tallinn	Таллинн	Baltic Shipyard, Leningrad	1953	11 September 1954	—N/a	Broken up, 1961	Named after the city of Tallinn
Varyag	Варя́г	Baltic Shipyard, Leningrad	December 1952	5 June 1956	—N/a	Broken up, 1961	Named after the Varangians, or Vikings
Ordzhonikidze	Орджоникидзе	Admiralty Shipyard, Leningrad	19 October 1949	17 September 1950	30 June 1952	Broken up, 1972	Named after Sergo Ordzhonikidze. Sold to Indonesia 1962, recommissioned KRI Irian in 1963. Sold for scrap to Taiwan in 1972. British frogman Lionel Crabb disappeared in 1956 when secretly inspecting this ship for MI6 when she was docked in Portsmouth Harbor.
Aleksandr Nevsky	Александр Невский	Admiralty Shipyard, Leningrad	30 May 1950	7 June 1951	31 December 1952	Stricken 1989	Named after Alexander Nevsky. Scrapped 1989
Admiral Lazarev	Адмирал Лазарев	Admiralty Shipyard, Leningrad	6 February 1951	29 June 1952	30 December 1952	Decommissioned 1986	Named after Mikhail Petrovich Lazarev. Sold for scrap 1991.
Shcherbakov	Щербаков	Admiralty Shipyard, Leningrad	June 1951	17 March 1954	—N/a	Broken up, 1961	Named after Soviet politician and writer Aleksandr Shcherbakov
Dzerzhinsky	Дзержинский	Nikolayev	31 December 1948	31 August 1950	18 August 1952	Stricken 1989	Named after revolutionary and head of the first Soviet secret police Felix Edmundovich Dzerzhinsky. On 19 February 1980, she was relegated to the reserve and stationed in Sevastopol; Decommissioned on 12 October 1988; 1988-1989 scrapped at Inkerman.
Admiral Nakhimov	Адмирал Нахимов	Nikolayev	27 June 1950	29 June 1951	27 March 1953	Stricken 1961	Named after Admiral Pavel Nakhimov. Rearmed as guided missile trials ship in the late 1950s, target ship 1961
Mikhail Kutuzov	Михаил Кутузов	Nikolayev	23 February 1951	29 November 1952	30 February 1954	Museum ship	Named after Russian field marshal Mikhail Illarionovich Kutuzov. Museum ship at Novorossiysk
Admiral Kornilov	Адмирал Корнилов	Nikolayev	6 November 1951	17 March 1954	—N/a	Hulk PKZ 130, 1957	Named after 19th century admiral Vladimir Kornilov
Oktyabrskaya Revolyutsia (ex-Molotovsk)	Октябрьская Революция	Severodvinsk	15 July 1952	25 May 1954	30 November 1954	Stricken 1987	Named after the October Revolution. Scrapped 1987
Murmansk	Мурманск	Severodvinsk	28 January 1953	24 April 1955	22 September 1955	Stricken 1992	Named after city of Murmansk. Decommissioned late 1980s. She ran aground in December 1994 at Hasvik, Norway, on her way to India to scrap
Arkhangelsk	Архангельск	Severodvinsk	1954	—N/a	—N/a	Broken up, 1961	Named after the city of Arkhangelsk
Vladivostok	Владивосток	Severodvinsk	1955	—N/a	—N/a	Broken up, 1961	Named after the city of Vladivostok

== Gallery ==
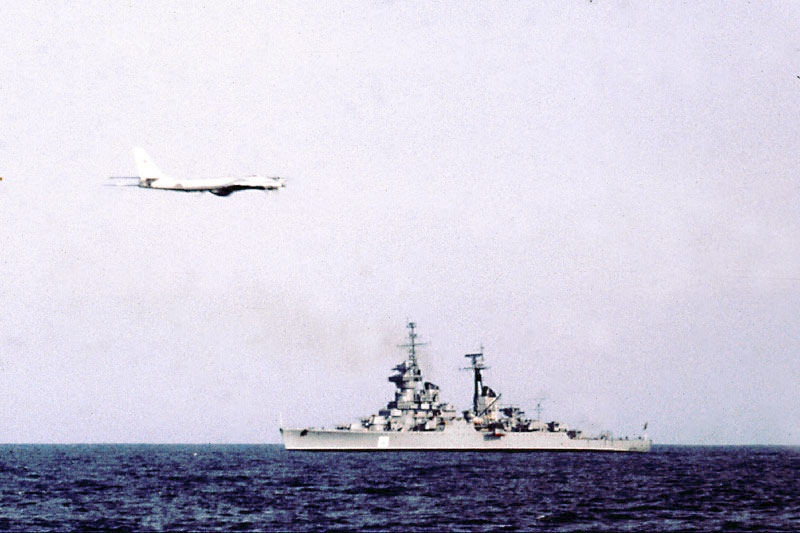
A Tu-95 Bear overflies a Sverdlov-class cruiser 1975

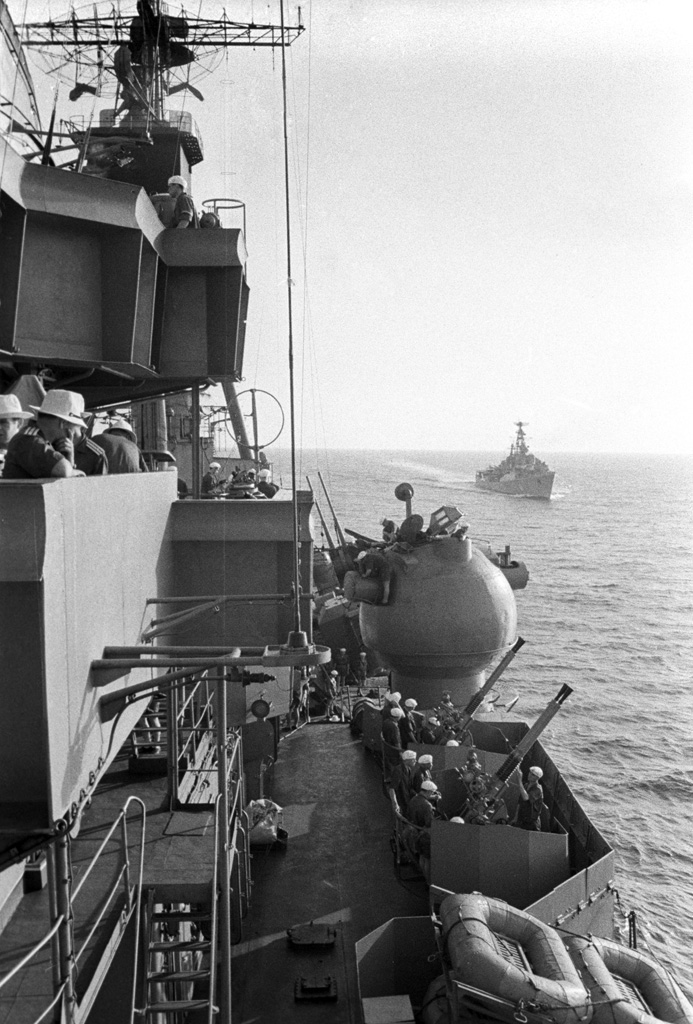
Dmitry Pozharsky (1968)

== See also ==
- List of ships of the Soviet Navy
- List of ships of Russia by project number
