= Soviet cruiser Mikhail Kutuzov =

Soviet Sverdlov-class cruiser

Coordinates: 44°43′16″N 37°46′55″E

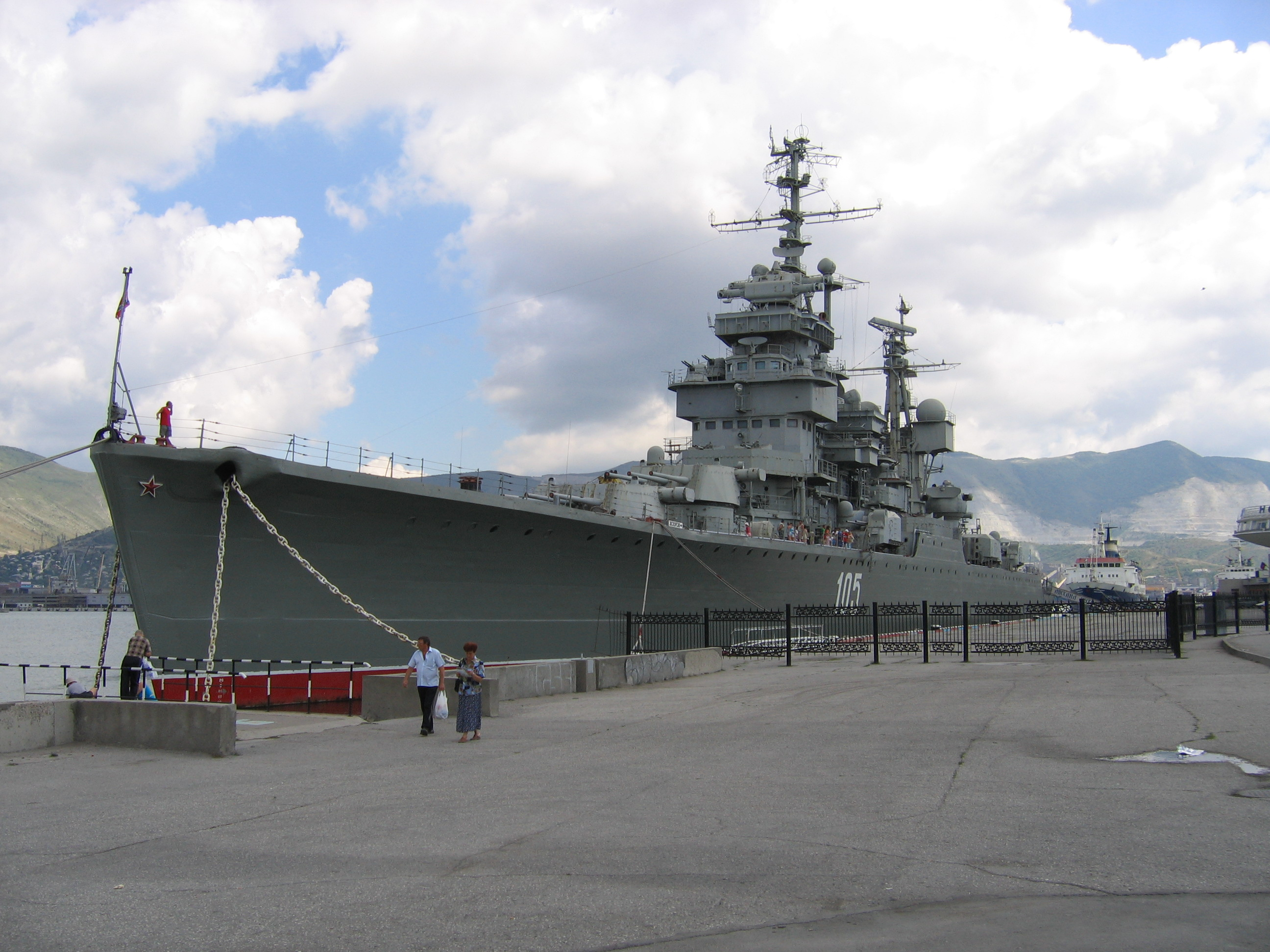
- Mikhail Kutuzov preserved as a museum

History

Russia
- Name: Mikhail Kutuzov; (Михаил Кутузов)
- Namesake: Mikhail Kutuzov
- Ordered: 22 February 1950
- Builder: Black Sea Shipyard, Nikolayev
- Yard number: 385
- Laid down: 23 February 1951
- Launched: 29 November 1952
- Commissioned: 30 December 1954
- Decommissioned: 2000
- Stricken: 25 August 2001
- Identification: See Pennant numbers
- Status: Museum ship in Novorossiysk

General characteristics
- Class & type: Sverdlov-class cruiser
- Displacement: 13,600 long tons (13,818 t) standard; 16,640 long tons (16,907 t) full load
- Length: 210 m (689 ft 0 in) overall; 205 m (672 ft 7 in) waterline
- Beam: 22 m (72 ft 2 in)
- Draught: 6.9 m (22 ft 8 in)
- Propulsion: 2 × shaft geared steam turbines; 6 × boilers, 110,000 hp (82,000 kW)
- Speed: 32.5 knots (60.2 km/h; 37.4 mph)
- Range: 9,000 nmi (17,000 km; 10,000 mi) at 18 knots (33 km/h; 21 mph)
- Complement: 1,250
- Armament: 4 × triple 15.2 cm (6.0 in)/57 cal B-38 guns in Mk5-bis turrets; 6 × twin 10 cm (3.9 in)/56 cal Model 1934 guns in SM-5-1 mounts; 8 × twin 3.0 cm (1.2 in) CIWS in AK-230; 16 × twin 3.7 cm (1.5 in) AA guns in V-11M mounts; 2 × quintuple 533 mm (21.0 in) torpedo tubes in PTA-53-68-bis mounts
- Armour: Belt: 100 mm (3.9 in); Conning tower: 150 mm (5.9 in); Deck: 50 mm (2.0 in); Turrets: 175 mm (6.9 in) front, 65 mm (2.6 in) sides, 60 mm (2.4 in) rear, 75 mm (3.0 in) roof; Barbettes: 130 mm (5.1 in); Bulkheads: 100–120 mm (3.9–4.7 in)

Mikhail Kutuzov (Russian: Михаил Кутузов) is a Project 68bis light cruiser (designated the Sverdlov class by NATO) of the Soviet and later the Russian Navy's Black Sea Fleet.

== Development and design ==
The Sverdlov-class cruisers, Soviet designation Project 68bis, were the last conventional gun cruisers built for the Soviet Navy. They were built in the 1950s and were based on Soviet, German, and Italian designs and concepts developed prior to the Second World War. They were modified to improve their sea keeping capabilities, allowing them to run at high speed in the rough waters of the North Atlantic. The basic hull was more modern and had better armor protection than the vast majority of the post Second World War gun cruiser designs built and deployed by peer nations. They also carried an extensive suite of modern radar equipment and anti-aircraft artillery. The Soviets originally planned to build 40 ships in the class, which would be supported by the Stalingrad-class battlecruisers and aircraft carriers.

The Sverdlov class displaced 13,600 tons standard and 16,640 tons at full load. They were 210 metres (689 ft 0 in) long overall and 205 metres (672 ft 7 in) long at the waterline. They had a beam of 22 metres (72 ft 2 in) and draught of 6.9 metres (22 ft 8 in) and typically had a complement of 1,250. The hull was a completely welded new design and the ships had a double bottom for over 75% of their length. The ship also had twenty-three watertight bulkheads. The Sverdlovs had six boilers providing steam to two shaft geared steam turbines generating 118,100 shaft horsepower (88,100 kW). This gave the ships a maximum speed of 32.5 knots (60.2 km/h; 37.4 mph). The cruisers had a range of 9,000 nautical miles (17,000 km; 10,000 mi) at 18 knots (33 km/h; 21 mph).

Sverdlov-class cruisers main armament included twelve 152 mm (6 in)/57 cal B-38 guns mounted in four triple Mk5-bis turrets. They also had twelve 100 mm (3.9 in)/56 cal Model 1934 guns in six twin SM-5-1 mounts. For anti-aircraft weaponry, the cruisers had thirty-two 37 mm (1.5 in) anti-aircraft guns in sixteen twin mounts and were also equipped with ten 533 mm (21 in) torpedo tubes in two mountings of five each. In 1986, Mikhail Kutuzov was the fourth and last of the Sverdlov-class to be modernized to the Project 68A standard, replacing the torpedo tubes and four of the 37 mm twin mounts with eight 30 mm (1.2 in) AK-230 CIWS mounts.

The Sverdlovs had 100 mm (3.9 in) belt armor and had a 50 mm (2.0 in) armored deck. The turrets were shielded by 175 mm (6.9 in) armor and the conning tower, by 150 mm (5.9 in) armor.

The cruisers' ultimate radar suite included one 'Big Net' or 'Top Trough' air search radar, one 'High Sieve' or 'Low Sieve' air search radar, one 'Knife Rest' air search radar and one 'Slim Net' air search radar. For navigational radar they had one 'Don-2' or 'Neptune' model. For fire control purposes the ships were equipped with two 'Sun Visor' radars, two 'Top Bow' 152 mm gun radars and eight 'Egg Cup' gun radars. For electronic countermeasures the ships were equipped with two 'Watch Dog' ECM systems.

== Construction and career ==
She was laid down at the Black Sea Shipyard in Nikolayev on 23 February 1951 and commissioned on 30 December 1954. Mikhail Kutuzov joined the Black Sea Fleet after commissioning and sea trials, on 31 January 1955.

On 28 July 2002, Mikhail Kutuzov was opened to the public as a museum ship in Novorossiysk. On 1 October 2012, she was made a branch of the Central Naval Museum.

=== Pennant numbers ===
Date	Pennant number
	4
1954	18
1955	554
1957	46
1958	24
1959	131
1960	590
1962	108
1964	131
	832
1968	850
1969	856
1970	590
1970	859
1971	850
1977	854
1977	020
	010
1978	113
1980	920
	113
1984	105
	852
	100
	102
