= Russian ship Admiral Nakhimov =

At least five warships of Russia have borne the name Admiral Nakhimov, in honour of Pavel Nakhimov (1802–1855), an admiral of the Imperial Russian Navy.

- Russian cruiser Admiral Nakhimov (1885), an armoured cruiser launched in 1885.
- Russian cruiser Admiral Nakhimov (1915), a light cruiser launched in 1915, name ship of her class, she was renamed Chervona Ukraina by the Soviets.
- Soviet cruiser Admiral Nakhimov (1951), a Sverdlov-class cruiser launched in 1951.
- Soviet cruiser Admiral Nakhimov (1969), a Kresta II-class cruiser launched in 1969.
- Russian battlecruiser Admiral Nakhimov, a Kirov-class battlecruiser. Launched in 1986, she was originally named Kalinin.

== See also ==
- Admiral Nakhimov-class cruiser, a class of Russian cruisers constructed in the early 20th century.
- SS Admiral Nakhimov, a former German passenger ship initially launched in 1925 as SS Berlin III and salvaged by the Soviet Union in 1949; collided with a cargo ship in 1986 and sank in the Tsemes Bay near Novorossiysk.
