= Ivan Susanin (disambiguation) =

Ivan Susanin (died 1613) was a rural elder of the village of Domnino near Kostroma and a Russian national hero.

Ivan Susanin may also refer to:

- Ivan Susanin (Cavos), an opera by Catterino Cavos
- Ivan Susanin, the Soviet title of the opera A Life for the Tsar by Mikhail Glinka
- Ivan Susanin, Imperial Russian, later Soviet icebreaker, former CGS Minto
- Russian patrol ship Ivan Susanin of project 97P, built in 19731981
