= Rynda (disambiguation) =

Rynda were bodyguards of 16–17th century Russian tsars.

Rynda may also refer to:

- Russian Boyarin-class corvette Rynda, in the list of Russian steam frigates
- Russian Vitiaz-class corvette Rynda, in the list of cruisers of the Russian Navy
- Rynda (comics), a fictional character from Marvel Comics, wife of king Agon
