= List of cruisers of the Russian Navy =

== Cruisers of the Russian Imperial Navy (1873–1917) ==
=== Note on official classification ===
Until 1892, there was no standardized name for ships of the cruiser type. They were classified as armoured frigates, armoured corvettes and even screw corvettes. The "Cruiser" \ «крейсер» designation appeared in 1878, but only for auxiliary non-protected ships. Starting in 1892 and up to 1907, all of these ships were divided between 1st rank cruisers and 2nd rank cruisers, although this division did not coincide with the delineation between armoured cruisers & protected cruisers. The designation "auxiliary cruiser" officially appeared in 1904. According to the new classification table of 1907, all cruisers, except auxiliary ships, were divided between "armoured cruisers" and "cruisers". During the first decades of the Soviet Navy the only one "cruiser" designation existed, but in 1949 cruisers were divided between "light cruisers", "heavy cruisers" and "training cruisers". Later "missile cruisers", "anti-submarine cruisers", "aircraft-carrying cruisers", "heavy nuclear missile cruisers" appeared.

=== Armoured cruiser ===
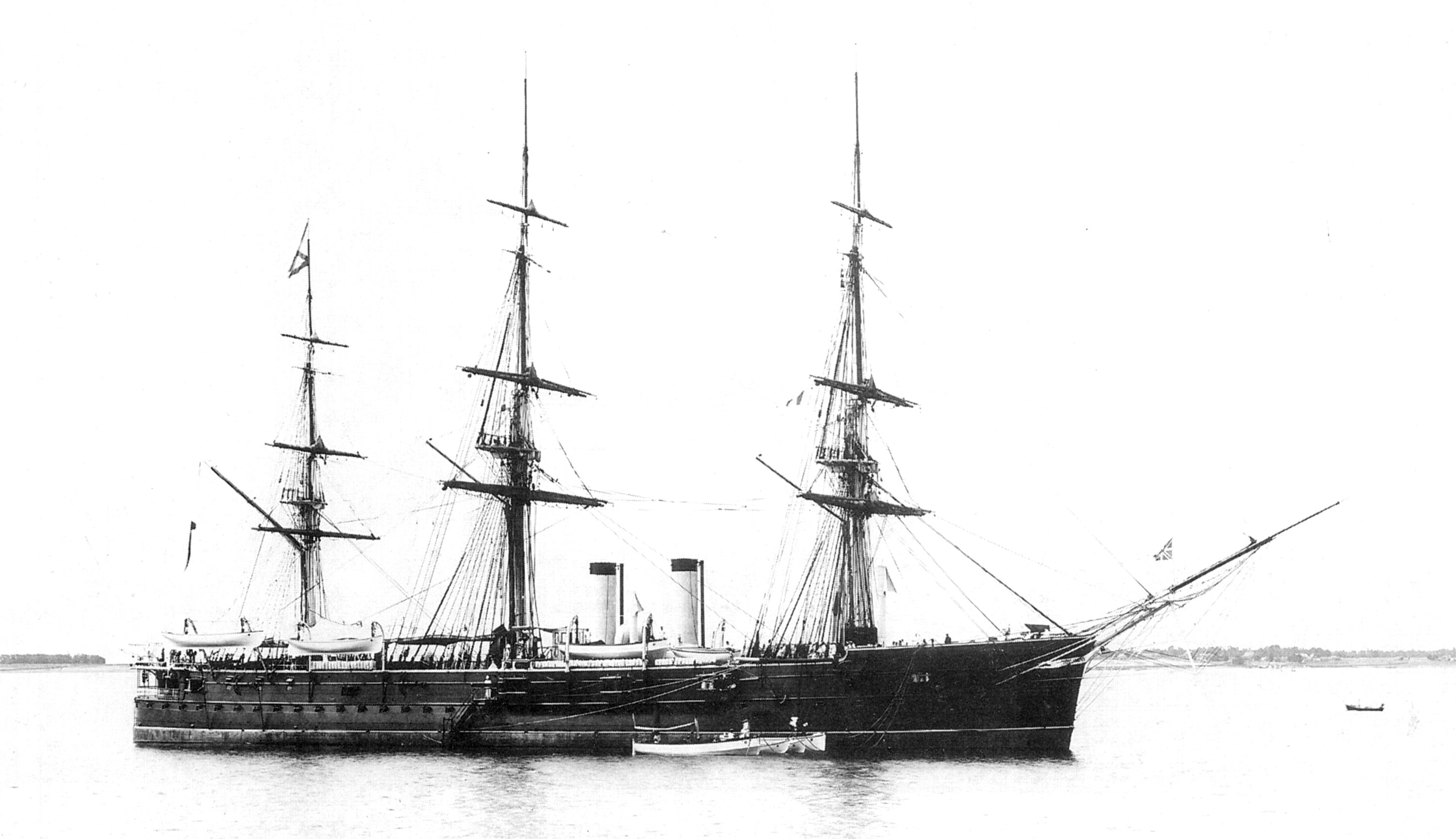
General-Admiral (1873) — first in the world armoured cruiser.

This type of warship was invented by Russians. The ships were intended to conduct the traditional cruiser operations against merchant ships and their protectors. For this reason, they had been armed with heavy main guns and medium armour to fight with light cruisers. The ships also possessed relatively high speed to escape from an opponent's battleships. All of them were officially classified as 1st rank cruisers and were assigned to the Baltic Fleet.

- General-Admiral class
  - General-Admiral \ «Генерал-адмирал», armoured frigate (1873) - Voyaged in Atlantic Ocean 1893, used as training vessel since early 1900s (decade), minelayer Narova \ «Нарова» 1909, training vessel 1920, reconstructed as minelayer 25 Oktiabria \ «25 Октября» 1924, mother-ship 1937, decommissioned 1944, BU 1953
  - Gerzog Edinburgski \ «Герцог Эдинбургский», armoured frigate (ex-Alexander Nevsky \ «Александр Невский» - renamed on slip) (1875) - Served at Far East 1879–1884 and at Mediterranean Sea 1897–c.1900, used as training vessel since early 1900s (decade), reconstructed as minelayer Onega \ «Онега» 1909, hulked as mine depot 1914 (named № 4, Barrikada \ «Баррикада», № 9), BU 1949
- Minin \ «Минин», armoured frigate (1869) - Rebuilt during completion as seagoing cruiser and commissioned 1878, reclassified as 1st rank cruiser 1892, Reconstructed as minelayer Ladoga \ «Ладога» 1909, Mined 1915
- Vladimir Monomakh-class armoured frigates (2 units)
  - Vladimir Monomakh \ «Владимир Мономах» (1882) - Served at Far East 1890–1892 & 1894–1902, torpedoed at the Battle of Tsushima 1905
  - Dmitrii Donskoi \ «Дмитрий Донской» (1883) - Served at Atlantic Ocean 1893 and far East 1895–1901, damaged and scuttled after the Battle of Tsushima to prevent capture 1905 (82 men lost)
- Admiral Nakhimov \ «Адмирал Нахимов», armoured cruiser (1885) - Served at Far East 1888–1891, 1894–1898 & 1899–1902 and at Mediterranean Sea 1893, torpedoed at the Battle of Tsushima 1905 (18 men lost)
- Pamiat Azova \ «Память Азова», armoured frigate (1888) - Voyaged Northern Pacific 1890–1892, served here 1893–1900, converted to training vessel Dvina \ «Двина», submarine base 1915, renamed Pamiat Azova 1917, torpedoed at Kronstadt 1919
- Rurik-class cruisers of 1st rank (3 units)
  - Rurik \ «Рюрик» (1892) - Served at the Far East 1895–1904, sunk at the Battle of the Japanese Sea 1904 (202 men lost)
  - Rossia \ «Россия» (1895) - Served at Far East 1895–1906, flagship of Rear Admiral Karl Jessen during the Russo-Japanese War, laid up 1918, BU 1922
  - Gromoboi \ «Громобой» (1899) (transitional type to squadron cruisers) - Served at Far East 1900–1906, laid up 1918, BU 1922
- Bayan class (4 units)
  - Bayan \ «Баян» (1900, La Seyne) - Served at Far East 1903–1904, sunk by shells and blown up to prevent capture 1904, refloated by Japan and renamed Aso 1908, minelayer 1920, hulked 1930, sunk as target 1932
  - Admiral Makarov \ «Адмирал Макаров» (1906, La Seyne) - Voyaged Mediterranean Sea 1908–1909 & 1909–1910, laid up 1918, BU 1922
  - Pallada \ «Паллада» (1906) - Torpedoed near Odensholm Island 1914 (594 men lost)
  - Bayan (1907) - Laid up 1918, BU 1922

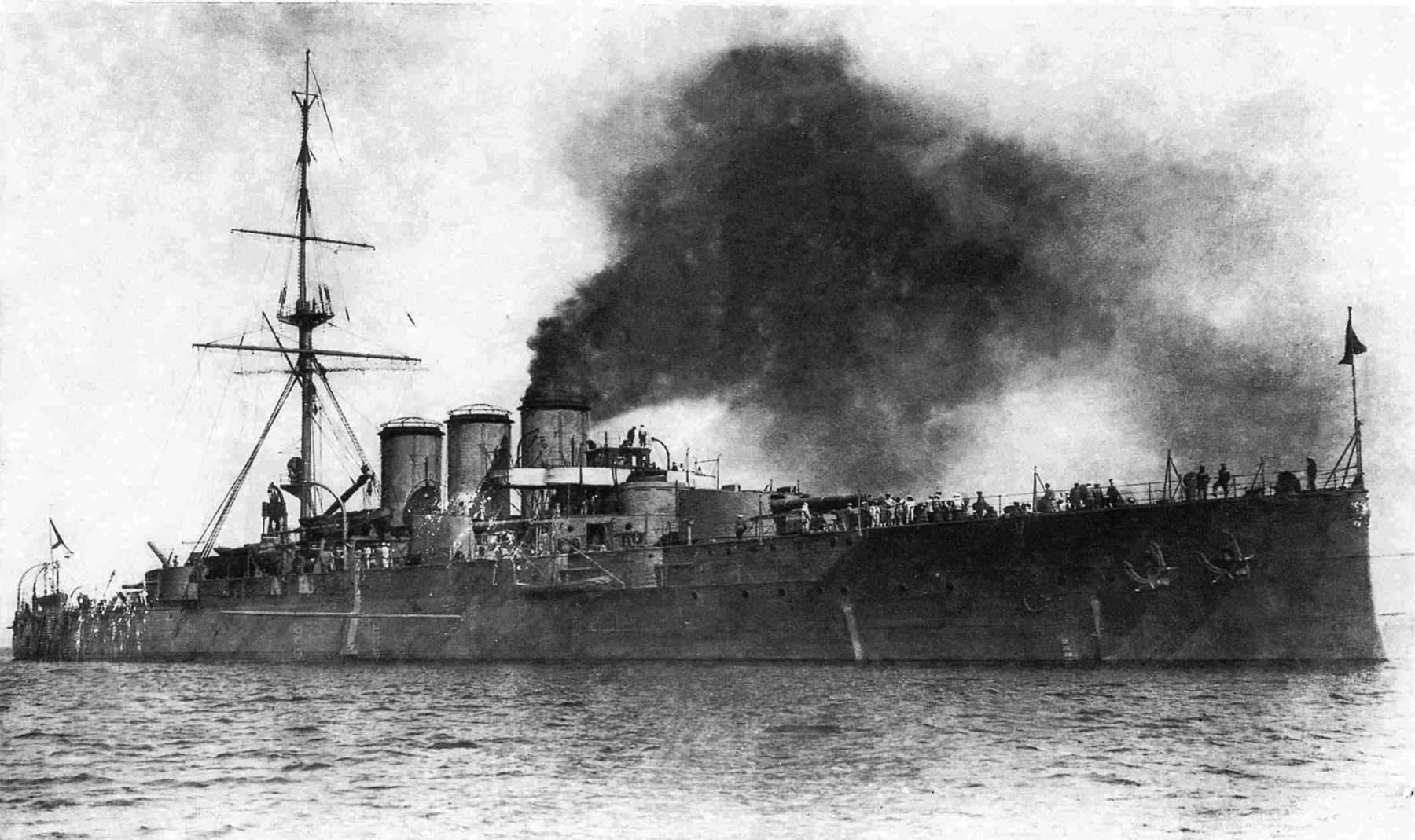
Cruiser Rurik (1906)

- Rurik \ «Рюрик» (1906, Barrow-in-Furness) - Voyaged Mediterranean Sea 1910, flagship of Admiral Nikolai Essen during World War I, laid up 1921, BU 1924

=== Protected cruiser ===
Russia had nearly not developed this British-designed type of ship, and had instead concentrated on armoured cruisers. Most of these ships were classified officially as 1st rank cruisers, they were assigned to the Baltic Fleet, with the exception of a handful of ships.

- Vitiaz-class screw corvettes (2 units)
  - Vitiaz \ «Витязь»(1884) - Voyaged to Far East 1886–1889 & 1891–1893, wrecked in Korea Strait 1893
  - Rynda \ «Рында» (1885) - Voyaged to Far East 1886–1889, served here 1893–1896, training vessel 1906, laid up 1918, BU 1922
- Admiral Kornilov \ «Адмирал Корнилов», cruiser (1887, Saint-Nazaire) - Served at Far East 1899–1891 & 1893–1902, reclassified to cruiser of 2nd Rank 1905 and training vessel 1907, decommissioned 1911
- Pallada-class cruisers of 1st Rank (3 units). In fact, it turned out, they were not suitable to cruiser duty due to low speed and extra low range. Two of them were used as fire-watch ships at Port Arthur, the third became excellent training cruiser for naval cadets.
  - Pallada \ «Паллада» (1899) - Served at Far East 1902–1904, sunk at Port Arthur 1904, refloated by Japan and renamed Tsugaru, reconstructed as minelayer 1920, decommissioned 1922, sunk as target 1924
  - Diana \ «Диана» (1899) - Served at Far East 1902–1906, interned by France 1904, released 1905, laid up 1918, BU 1922
  - Aurora \ «Аврора» (1900) - Served at Far East 1902–1906, interned by U.S.A. 1905, released 1905, participated October Revolution (1917), training cruiser and cadets' training base 1922–1961, museum ship since 1948, preserved at Saint Petersburg
- Varyag \ «Варяг» (1899, Philadelphia) - Served at Far East, scuttled after the Battle of Chemulpo 1904, refloated by Japan, renamed Soya, purchased by Russia 1916, renamed Varyag and transferred to Arctic Sea Flotilla 1916, seized by the British 1918, used as floating barracks, sold to Germany for BU 1921, wrecked 1922

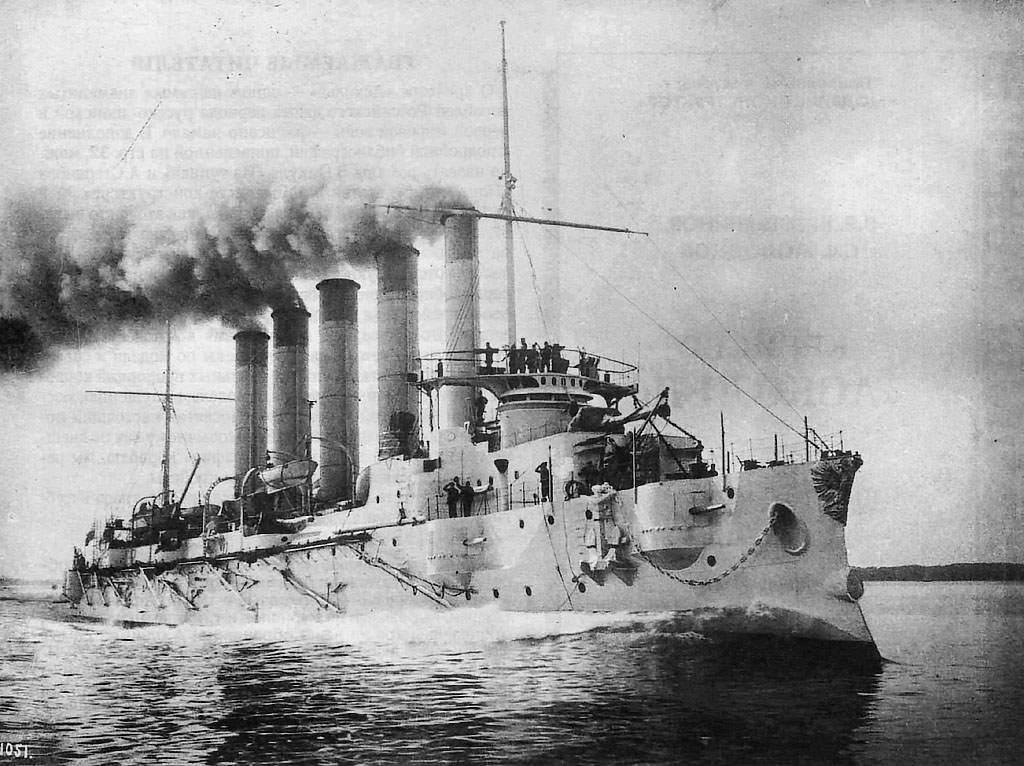
Cruiser Askol‘d (1900)

- Askold \ «Аскольд» (1900, Kiel) - Served at Far East 1902–1914, interned by China to prevent capture 1904, released 1905, served at Mediterranean Sea 1914–1916, transferred to Arctic Sea Flotilla 1916, captured by Britain 1918, renamed HMS Gloria IV, returned to Soviet Russia 1922 and sold for BU
- Bogatyr class (5 units). Reclassified as "cruisers" in 1907
  - Bogatyr \ «Богатырь» (1901, Stettin) - Served at Far East 1902–1906, voyaged Mediterranean Sea 1907–1910, laid up 1918, BU 1922
  - Kagul \ «Кагул» (ex-Ochakov \ «Очаков», renamed 1906) (1902 Black Sea Fleet) - Renamed Ochakov 1917, captured by Germany 1918, captured by Britain and delivered to White Army 1918, renamed General Kornilov \ «Генерал Корнилов», interned by France in Bizerte, returned to Soviet Russia 1924 and sold for BU, BU 1933
  - Pamiat Merkuria \ «Память Меркурия» (ex-Kagul \ «Кагул», renamed 1906) (1902 Black Sea Fleet) - Destroyed by British troops 1919, repaired, reclassified to light cruiser and renamed Komintern \ «Коминтерн» 1922, scuttled as breakwater 1942
  - Oleg \ «Олег» (1903) - sent to Far East 1905, flagship of Rear Admiral Oskar Enkvist at the Battle of Tsushima (1905), interned by U.S.A. after the battle, released 1905, voyaged at Mediterranean Sea late 1900s (decade), torpedoed 1919, BU 1938
  - Vitiaz \ «Витязь» - Burnt on slip 1901
- Novik class (1 unit)
  - Novik \ «Новик» (1900, Danzig or Elbing) - Served at Far East 1903–1904, damaged and scuttled to prevent capture 1904, refloated by Japan, commissioned as light cruiser Suzuya, BU 1913
- Boyarin class (1 unit)
  - Boyarin \ «Боярин» (1901, Copenhagen) - Served at Far East 1903–1904, mined near Port Arthur 1904
- Zhemchug class (upgraded Novik class) (2 units)
  - Zhemchug \ «Жемчуг» (1903) - Served at Far East 1905–1914, interned by U.S.A. after the Battle of Tsushima (1905), released 1905 and transferred to Siberian Flotilla, sunk in Battle of Penang 1914
  - Izumrud \ «Изумруд»(1903) - Sent to Far East 1905, wrecked and blown up to prevent capture 1905, found by divers 1989
- Prut \ «Прут», Cruiser (1903; ex-Turkish Mecidiye, ex-Abdül Mecid ) - Mined near Odessa 1915, refloated by Russians, repaired and commissioned 1916, captured by Germany, returned Turkey and renamed Mecidiye 1918, Training vessel 1940, decommissioned 1947, BU 1952
- Muraviev Amurski class (2 units). Both cruisers were ordered in Germany for the Siberian Flotilla. At the beginning of World War I these were confiscated by Germans and commissioned to Kaiserliche Marine.
  - Muraviev Amurski \ «Муравьёв-Амурский» (1914) - Since 1914 SMS Pillau, ceded to Italy and renamed Bari, sunk 1943
  - Admiral Nevel‘skoi \ «Адмирал Невельской» (1914) - Since 1914 SMS Elbing, sunk at the Battle of Jutland 1916

=== Yacht cruisers ===
These ships were simply yachts equipped with large calibre artillery. Svetlana was protected, but the others were not.

- Pamiat Merkuria \ «Память Меркурия», Cruiser (1880, Le Havre; ex-Dobroflot liner Yaroslavl 1 \ «Ярославль (1)») - Purchased for Black Sea Fleet 1882, reclassified Cruiser of 1st Rank 1892, decommissioned 1907
- Svetlana \ «Светлана», Cruiser of 1st Rank (1896, Le Havre) - Sunk at the Battle of Tsushima 1905 (170 men lost)
- Almaz \ «Алмаз», Cruiser of 2nd Rank (1903) - Interned by US after the Battle of Tsushima (1905), released 1905, reclassified to aviso in 1906 and yacht 1908, equipped by hydroplanes (first in the Russian Navy) 1914 and non-officially classified as hydroplane cruiser, captured by White Army 1919, interned by France in Bizerte 1920, returned to Soviet Russia 1924, sold for BU and BU 1934

=== Torpedo cruisers ===
The Russian Navy classified these ships as "minnyi kreiser" \ «минный крейсер» (Torpedo cruiser): something between cruiser and torpedo boat, and the direct predecessor of destroyers, but were rather larger and stronger than the destroyers of the 1900s (decade). The ships were purposed to struggle with an opponent's torpedo boats, as well as to serve as a torpedo boat squadron leader, escort ship, tow-ship, and other missions. Later, the first Russian destroyers were originally classified as torpedo cruisers.

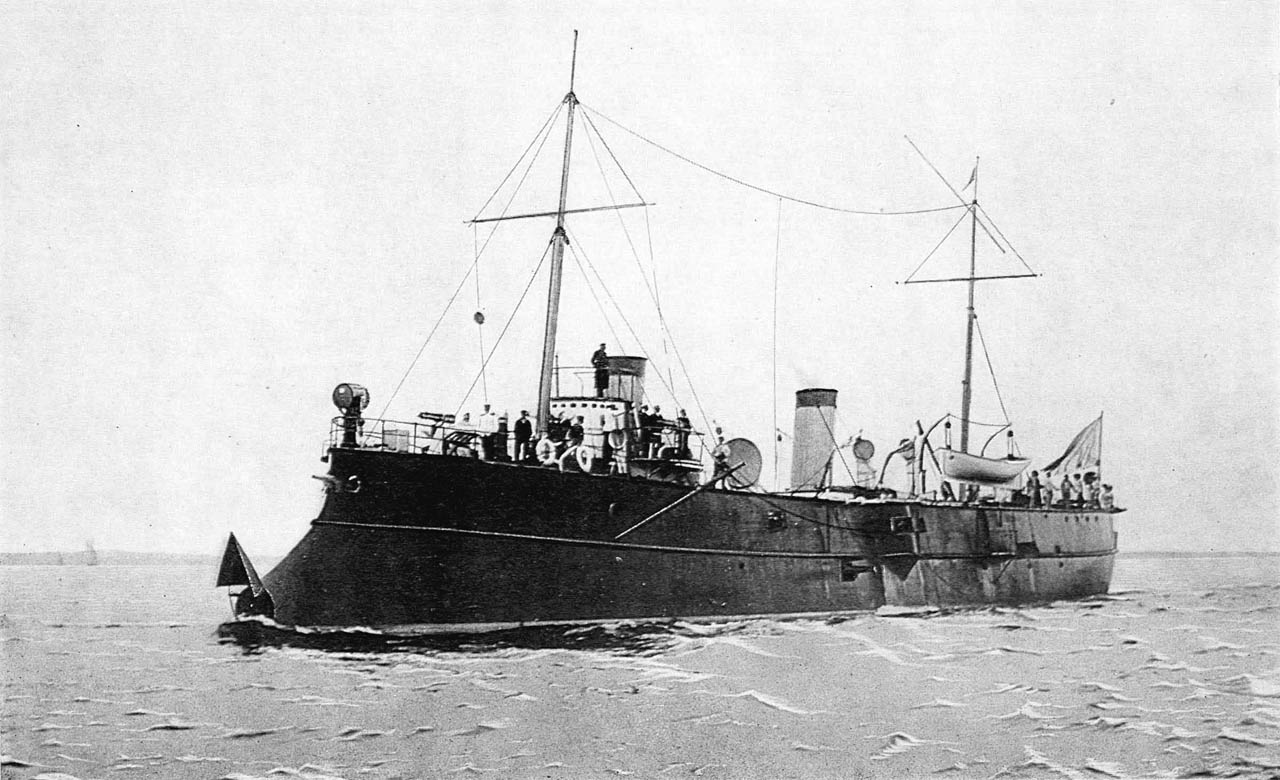
Torpedo cruiser Leytenant Ilyin (1886)

- Leytenant Ilyin class (2 units)
  - Leytenant Ilyin \ «Лейтенант Ильин» (1886 Baltic Fleet) - Aviso 1907, decommissioned 1911
  - Kapitan Saken \ «Капитан Сакен» (1886 Black Sea Fleet) - Harbour vessel Bombory \ «Бомборы» 1907, decommissioned 1909
- Kazarskii class (6 units)
  - Kazarskii \ «Казарский» (1889 Elbing, Black Sea Fleet) - Aviso 1907, laid up 1925
  - Voyevoda \ «Воевода» (1892 Elbing, Baltic Fleet) - Aviso 1907, captured by Finland 1918, sold to Finland 1922, served as gunboat until 1940
  - Posadnik \ «Посадник» (1892 Elbing, Baltic Fleet) - Served at Mediterranean Sea in late 1890s, aviso 1907, captured by Finland 1918, sold to Finland 1922, used as gunboat, minelayer and patrol boat until 1927, BU 1964
  - Vsadnik \ «Всадник» (1893 Siberian Flotilla) - Sank in Port Arthur 1904, refloated by Japan and commissioned as gunboat Makikumo 1906, BU 1914
  - Gaidamak \ «Гайдамак» (1893 Siberian Flotilla) - Scuttled in Port Arthur 1904, refloated by Japan and commissioned as gunboat Shikinami 1906, BU 1914
  - Griden‘ \ «Гридень» (1893 Black Sea Fleet) - Aviso 1907, delivered to Corps of Frontier Guard
- Abrek \ «Абрек» (1896) - Operated at Mediterranean Sea 1899–1904, delivered to Corps of Frontier Guard 1908, mobilized as aviso 1914, laid up 1921–1926, mother ship 1940, BU 1948

=== Battlecruisers ===
Actually, they were not battlecruisers, but rather fast super-dreadnoughts.

- Izmail or Borodino class (4 units)
  - Izmail \ «Измаил» (1915) - Not completed, BU 1931
  - Borodino \ «Бородино» (1915) - Not completed, sold for BU 1923
  - Kinburn \ «Кинбурн» (1915) - Not completed, sold for BU 1923
  - Navarin \ «Наварин» (1916) - Not completed, sold for BU 1923

=== Non-protected & auxiliary cruisers ===
Commissioning of these ships was an extraordinary measure taken during the periods of political crises of 1878 and 1904–1905. Auxiliary cruisers, which were used in 1904–1905, were specially constructed or reconstructed as ships of "double destination": ocean liners at the times of peace and cruisers during war. Most of them were officially classified as cruisers and auxiliary cruisers and belonged to the Baltic Fleet (but two).

- Rossiya \ «Россия», Cruiser (1868; ex-German liner Holsatia) - Purchased 1878, delivered to Dobroflot 1878, purchased by Navy and commissioned as Training vessel Dnestr \ «Днестр» 1894, hulked 1910.
- Moskva \ «Москва», Cruiser (1866; ex-German liner Hammonia) - Purchased 1878, delivered to Dobroflot as Moskva 1 1878, wrecked 1882
- Peterburg \ «Петербург», Cruiser (1870; ex-German liner Thuringia) - Purchased 1878, delivered to Dobroflot as Peterburg 1 1878, purchased by Navy and commissioned as Training vessel Berezan‘ \ «Березань» 1893, Transport 1909, floating workshop 1916, submarine base 1921, BU 1931
- Asia \ «Азия», Cruiser (1874; ex-American liner Columbus) - Purchased 1878, served at Far East and Mediterranean Sea 1879–1882, Cruiser of 2nd Rank 1892, reconstruct to coal transport in early 1900s (decade), decommissioned 1911, renamed Kaukas October 1912, recommissioned as Asia September 1914, laid up 1918, BU 1923
- Afrika \ «Африка», Cruiser (1877; ex-American liner Saratoga) - Purchased 1878, served Far East 1879–1882, Cruiser of 2nd Rank 1892, equipped by radio station (first of the Russian Navy) 1897, Training vessel and divers' base 1906, laid up 1918, BU 1923
- Evropa \ «Европа», Cruiser (1878; ex-American liner State of California) - Purchased 1878, operated at Far East 1879–1880, delivered to Dobroflot 1885, renamed Yaroslavl‘ 2 \ «Ярославль (2)», captured by Finland 1918
- Zabiyaka \ «Забияка», Cruiser (1878, Philadelphia) - Served at Far East and Mediterranean Sea 1879–1882, reclassified to Cruiser of 2nd Rank and transferred to Siberian Flotilla 1892–1893, sank in Port Arthur 1904

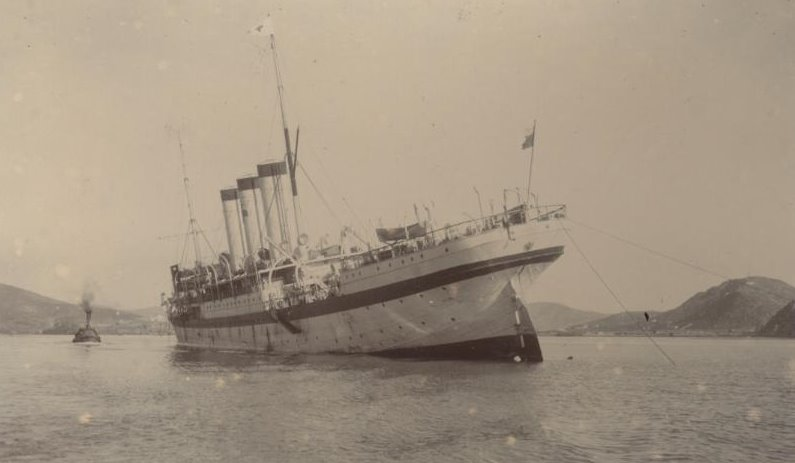
Hospital ship Moskva (1898), former naval transport Angara (in fact — auxiliary cruiser) in Port Arthur, 1904.

- Kuban‘ \ «Кубань», Auxiliary Cruiser (1889; ex-German liner Auguste Victoria, ex-Augusta Victoria, ex-Normannia) - Purchased 1904, decommissioned 1906, BU 1907
- Don \ «Дон», Auxiliary Cruiser (1891; ex-German liner Fürst Bismarck) - Purchased 1904, sold to Dobroflot 1906 as Moskva 4 \ «Москва (4)», resold to Austrian Navy and converted to submarines' base Gaa 1909, seized by Italy 1919, reconstructed as liner San Giusto, BU 1924
- Ural \ «Урал», Auxiliary Cruiser (1890; ex-German liner Kaiserin Maria Theresia, ex-Spree) - Purchased 1904, sunk at the Battle of Tsushima 1905
- Terek \ «Терек», Auxiliary Cruiser (1889; ex-German liner Columbia, ex-Spanish cruiser Rapido, ex-German liner Columbia) - Purchased 1904, decommissioned 1906, BU 1907
- Dnepr \ «Днепр», Auxiliary Cruiser (1894; ex-Dobroflot liner Peterburg 2 \ «Петербург (2)») - Commissioned 1904, returned to Dobroflot 1905 and served under the old name, commissioned 1914 as transport Don \ «Дон», captured by Germany 1918, captured by Britain 1918, delivered to White Army 1919, interned by France at Bizerte 1920, sold for BU 1922
- Rion \ «Рион», Auxiliary Cruiser (1901; ex-Dobroflot liner Smolensk \ «Смоленск») - Commissioned 1904, returned to Dobroflot 1905 and served under the old name, commissioned as Training vessel Rion 1913, Transport 1914, captured by White Army 1919, interned by France in Bizerte 1920, returned to Soviet Russia 1924 and sold for BU
- Rus‘ \ «Русь», Auxiliary Cruiser (1887; ex-German liner Lahn) - Purchased 1904 and reconstruct as balloon-carrying ship, sold for BU 1906
- Oriol \ «Орёл», Auxiliary Cruiser (1909; ex-Dobroflot liner Oriol 2) - Commissioned to Siberian Flotilla 1914, used as training vessel, captured by White Army 1918, returned to Dobroflot 1920, sold to Britain 1922, renamed Silvia, BU 1950
- Leitenant Dadymov \ «Лейтенант Дадымов», Auxiliary Cruiser (?; ex-Boundary Guard's vessel) - Mobilized to Siberian Flotilla 1914, laid up 1918, captured by White Army 1918, sank 1922

NOTE: There were some other Dobroflot liners used in the Navy during the Russo-Japanese War, but they were classified as transports.

== Cruisers of the Soviet and modern Russian Navy ==
=== Light cruisers ===
The Russian class abbreviation is KRL, that also is used as prefix, for example: KRL Sverdlov or TRKR Piotr Velikii.

Legkiy kreiser \ «лёгкий крейсер» (КРЛ).

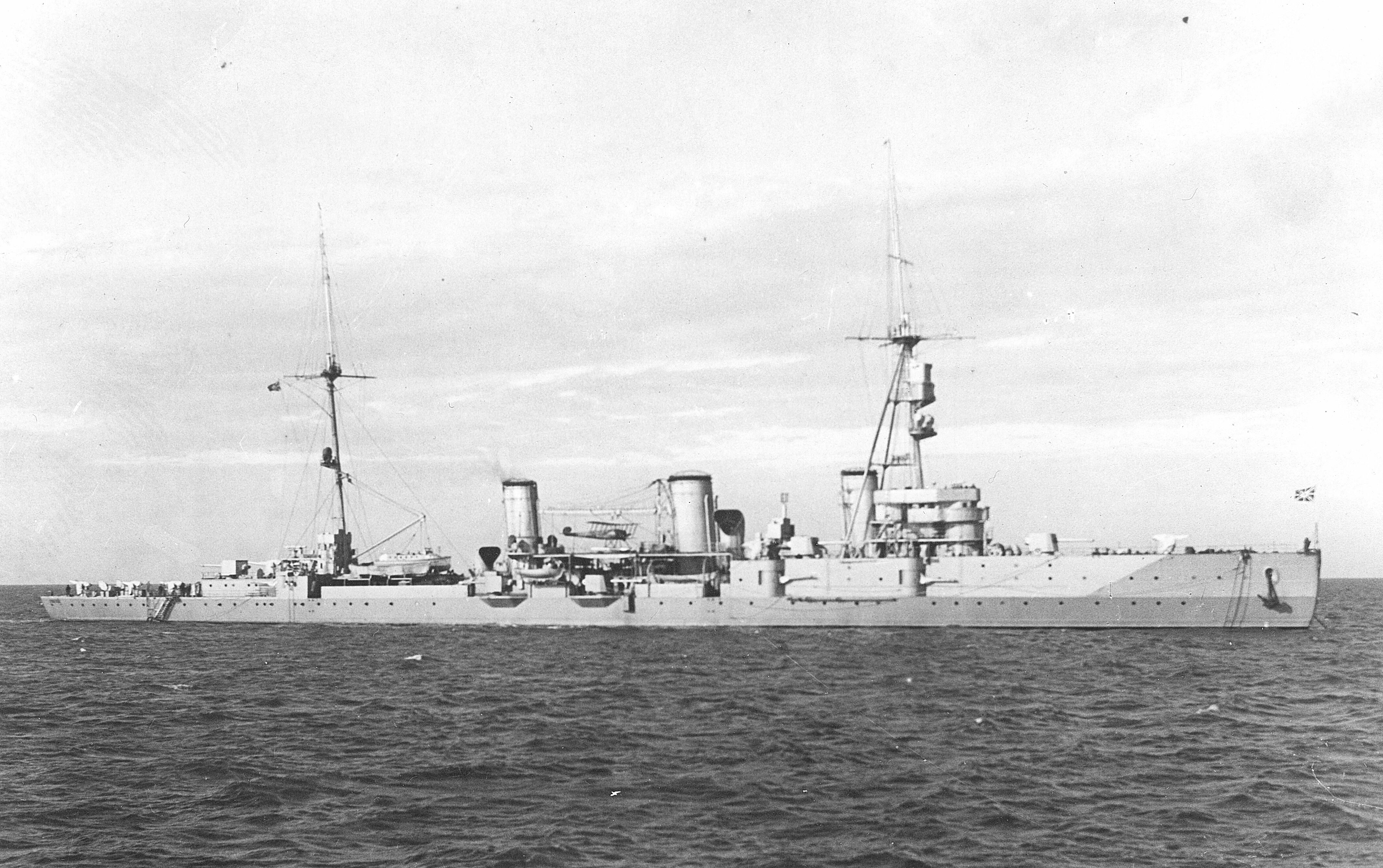
Cruiser Chervona Ukraina (1915), Black Sea, 1930s

- Svetlana class (8 units, commissioned 3). Laid up as far back as in Imperial Russia, but were not completed due to the Revolution and Civil war. Three of them were completed in Soviet Union. Belonged to the Black Sea Fleet (Profintern – to the Baltic Fleet until 1930).
  - Profintern \ «Профинтерн» (ex-Svetlana \ «Светлана», renamed 1925) (1915) - Transferred to the Black Sea Fleet 1929–1930, renamed Krasnyi Krym \ «Красный Крым» 1939, Training cruiser 1954, BU 1959. Guards cruiser since 1942.
  - Admiral Butakov \ «Адмирал Бутаков» (1916) - Non completed, laid up 1917, sunk 1942, BU 1952
  - Admiral Spiridov \ «Адмирал Спиридов» (1916) - Completed as tanker Grozneft‘ \ «Грознефть» 1926, BU 1952
  - Admiral Greig \ «Адмирал Грейг» (1916) - Completed as tanker Azneft‘ \ «Азнефть» 1926, wrecked 1937
- Admiral Nakhimov class
  - Chervona Ukraina \ «Червона Украина», and also «Червона Україна» (ex-Admiral Nakhimov \ «Адмрал Нахимов») (1915) - sank 1941
  - Krasnyi Kavkaz \ «Красный Кавказ» (ex-Admiral Lazarev \ «Адмирал Лазарев») (1916) - Training cruiser 1947, sunk as target 1952. Guards cruiser since 1942.
  - Admiral Kornilov \ «Адмирал Корнилов» (1917) - Non completed, BU 1932
  - Admiral Istomin \ «Адмирал Истомин» - Non completed, BU on slip 1927

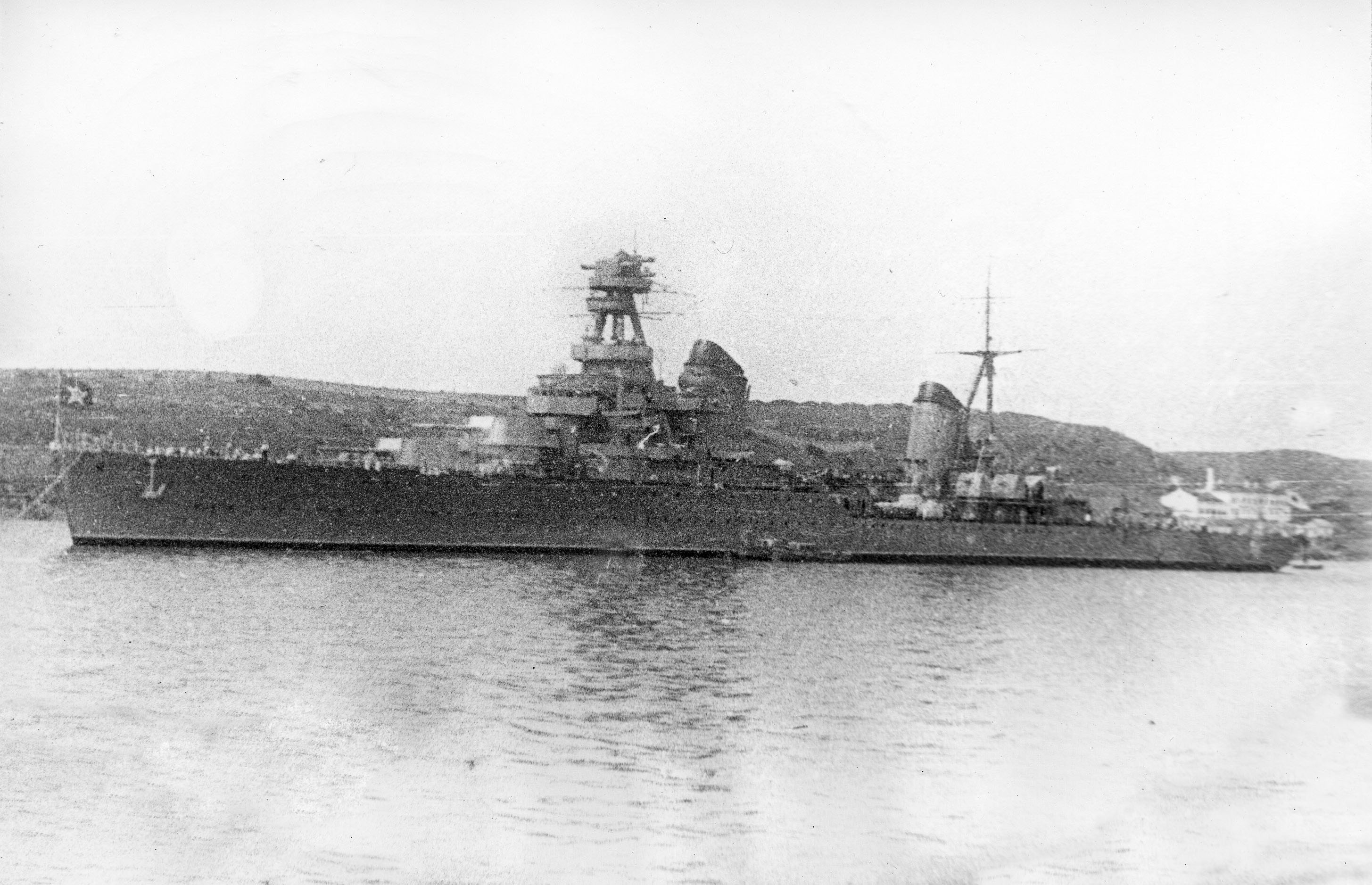
Cruiser Voroshilov (1937). Sevastopol, June 20, 1941 (two days before the war)

- Kirov class (Project 26 and 26-bis) (6 units). These cruisers were classified as light, but possessed 7-inch main calibre (making them heavy cruisers under the original definition of a heavy cruiser as a ship no more than 10,000 long tons with a main battery of more than 6.1-inch (155mm) but no more than 8-inch (203.4mm))
  - Project 26 (Kirov subclass) (2 units)
    - Kirov \ «Киров» (1936 Baltic Fleet) - Damaged by air bombs in 1941 & 1942, repaired 1943, decommissioned 1974
    - Voroshilov \ «Ворошилов» (1937 Black Sea Fleet) - Reconstructed as Project 33M experimental vessel 1963, BU 1970s
  - Project 26bis (Maxim Gorky subclass) (4 units)
    - Maxim Gorky \ «Максим Горький» (1938 Baltic Fleet) - Mined 1941, repaired 1941, BU 1958
    - Molotov \ «Молотов» (1939 Black Sea Fleet) - Torpedoed 1942, repaired 1943, transformed to training cruiser and renamed Slava \ «Слава» 1958, decommissioned 1972
    - Kalinin \ «Калинин» (1942 Pacific Ocean Fleet) - BU 1961
    - Kaganovich \ «Каганович» (1944 Pacific Ocean Fleet), renamed Lazar Kaganovich 1945, renamed Petropavlovsk 1957
- Chapayev (Project 68 and 68K) class (7 units, commissioned 5)
  - Chapayev \ «Чапаев» (1941) - Completed according to Project 68K 1950, training cruiser 1958, hulked as floating barracks 1960, decommissioned 1963
  - Kuibyshev \ «Куйбышев» (1941) - Commissioned 1950, training cruiser 1958, decommissioned 1965
  - Zhelezniakov \ «Железняков» (1941) - Completed according to Project 68K 1950, training cruiser 1961, decommissioned 1975
  - Chkalov \ «Чкалов» (1947) - Completed according to Project 68K 1950, training cruiser Komsomolets \ «Комсомолец» 1958, decommissioned 1979
  - Frunze \ «Фрунзе» (1940) - Completed according to Project 68K 1950, Training cruiser 1958, decommissioned 1960
  - Ordzhonikidze \ «Орджоникидзе» - Blown up on slip 1941 to prevent capture, BU by Germans until 1943
  - Sverdlov \ «Свердлов» - Blown up on slip 1941 to prevent capture, BU by Germans until 1943
- Murmansk \ «Мурманск» (1921; ex-American Milwaukee) - Delivered from U.S.A. on account of reparations from Italy 1944, returned to US 1947 (instead of Emanuele Filiberto Duca d'Aosta), BU 1949
- Admiral Makarov \ «Адмирал Макаров» (1934; ex-German Nürnberg) - Accepted by USSR according to reparations from Germany 1946, training cruiser 1957, decommissioned 1959
- Kerch‘ \ «Керчь» (1934; ex-Italian Emanuele Filiberto Duca d'Aosta - Accepted by USSR according to reparations from Italy 1949, training cruiser 1956, decommissioned 1959

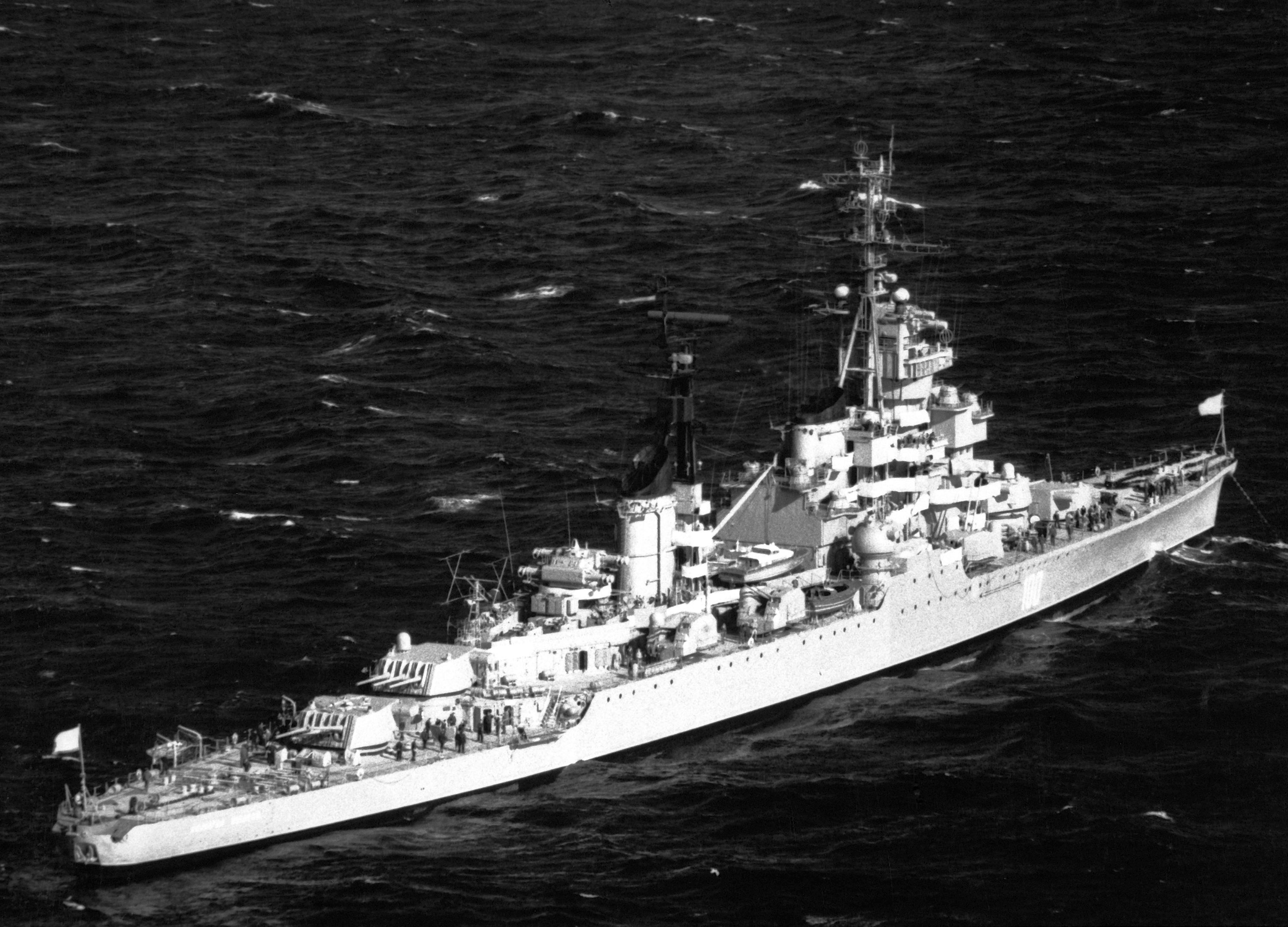
Project 68bis light cruiser Admiral Ushakov. 1981

- Sverdlov (Project 68bis) class (21 units, commissioned 14)
  - Sverdlov \ «Свердлов» (1950) - Laid up 1966, recommissioned 1972, laid up 1978, decommissioned 1989 and sold for BU
  - Ordzhonikidze \ «Орджоникидзе» (1950) - Sold to Indonesia 1962, renamed Irian, BU 1972
  - Zhdanov \ «Жданов» (1950) - Rebuilt to staff ship (project 68U-1) 1970, laid up 1988, decommissioned 1990 and sold for BU
  - Aleksandr Nevski \ «Александр Невский» (1951) - Laid up 1964, recommissioned 1970, decommissioned 1989
  - Admiral Nakhimov \ «Адмирал Нахимов» (1951) - Rebuilt (project 67EP) 1955, BU 1961-62
  - Admiral Ushakov \ «Адмирал Ушаков» (1951) - Laid up 1964, recommissioned and modernized (project 68A) 1971, laid up 1983, decommissioned 1987 and sold for BU
  - Admiral Lazarev \ «Адмирал Лазарев» (1952) - Laid up 1963, decommissioned 1986 and sold for BU
  - Dzerzhinsky \ «Дзержинский» (1952) - Modernized AA Missile Cruiser (project 70E) 1958, training cruiser 1951, laid up 1980, decommissioned 1988 and sold for BU
  - Admiral Seniavin \ «Адмирал Сенявин» (1952) - Rebuilt to staff ship (project 68U-2) 1972, decommissioned 1989 and sold for BU
  - Mikhail Kutuzov \ «Михаил Кутузов» (1952) - Modernized (project 68A) 1989, laid up 1990, museum ship in Sevastopol 2002
  - Aleksandr Suvorov \ «Александр Суворов» (1953) - Laid up 1986, decommissioned 1989 and sold for BU
  - Dmitrii Pozharskii \ «Дмитрий Пожарский» (1953) - Laid up 1979, decommissioned 1987 and sold for BU
  - Molotovsk \ «Молотовск» (1954) - Renamed Oktyabrskaya Revolutsia \ «Октябрьская Революуия» 1957, laid up 1960, recommissioned 1965, modernized (project 68A) 1969, decommissioned 1987 and sold for BU
  - Murmansk \ «Мурманск» (1955) - Laid up 1989, decommissioned 1992, grounded at Sørvær in Norway when towing for BU 1994. Scrapped in situ 2013.
  - Koz‘ma Minin \ «Козьма Минин» (Arkhangel‘sk \ «Архангельск») (1953) - Project 68bis-ZIF, non completed, BU 1959
  - Dmitrii Donskoi \ «Дмитрий Донской» (Vladivostok \ «Владивосток») (1953) - Project 68bis-ZIF, non completed, BU 1959
  - Kronstadt \ «Кронштадт» (1954) - Project 68bis-ZIF, non completed, BU 1959
  - Scherbakov \ «Щербаков» (1954) - Project 68bis-ZIF, non completed, BU 1959
  - Admiral Kornilov \ «Адмрал Корнилов» (1954) - Project 68bis-ZIF, non completed, BU 1959
  - Tallin \ «Таллин» (1955) - Project 68bis-ZIF, non completed, BU 1959
  - Varyag \ «Варяг» (1956) - Project 68bis-ZIF, non completed, BU 1959

=== Heavy cruisers (TKR) ===
Tyazhelyi kreiser \ «тяжёлый крейсер» (ТКР). Prior to and during the Second World War, the Soviet Navy attempted to procure heavier cruiser types, including two different battlecruiser designs. Despite these attempts, not one ship of these types was commissioned into Soviet Navy.

- Petropavlovsk \ «Петропавловск» (1939; ex-German Lützow) - Purchased being non-completed 1940, participated in the Battle for Leningrad (1941–1944) as floating 8-inch battery, damaged by shells 1941, refloated and repaired 1942, reformed to training vessel 1953, BU 1960
- Kronshtadt (Project 69) class (2 units)
  - Kronshtadt \ «Кронштадт» - Laid down 1939, BU on slip 1947
  - Sevastopol‘ \ «Севастополь» - Laid down 1939, blown up on slip 1941 to prevent capture, BU
- Stalingrad (Project 82) class (3 units)
  - Stalingrad \ «Сталинград» (1954) - Not completed, sunk as target 1950s
  - Moskva \ «Москва» - Laid down 1952, BU on slip 1950s
  - Arkhangel‘sk \ «Архангельск» - Laid down 1952, BU on slip 1950s

=== Guided missile cruisers (RKR) ===
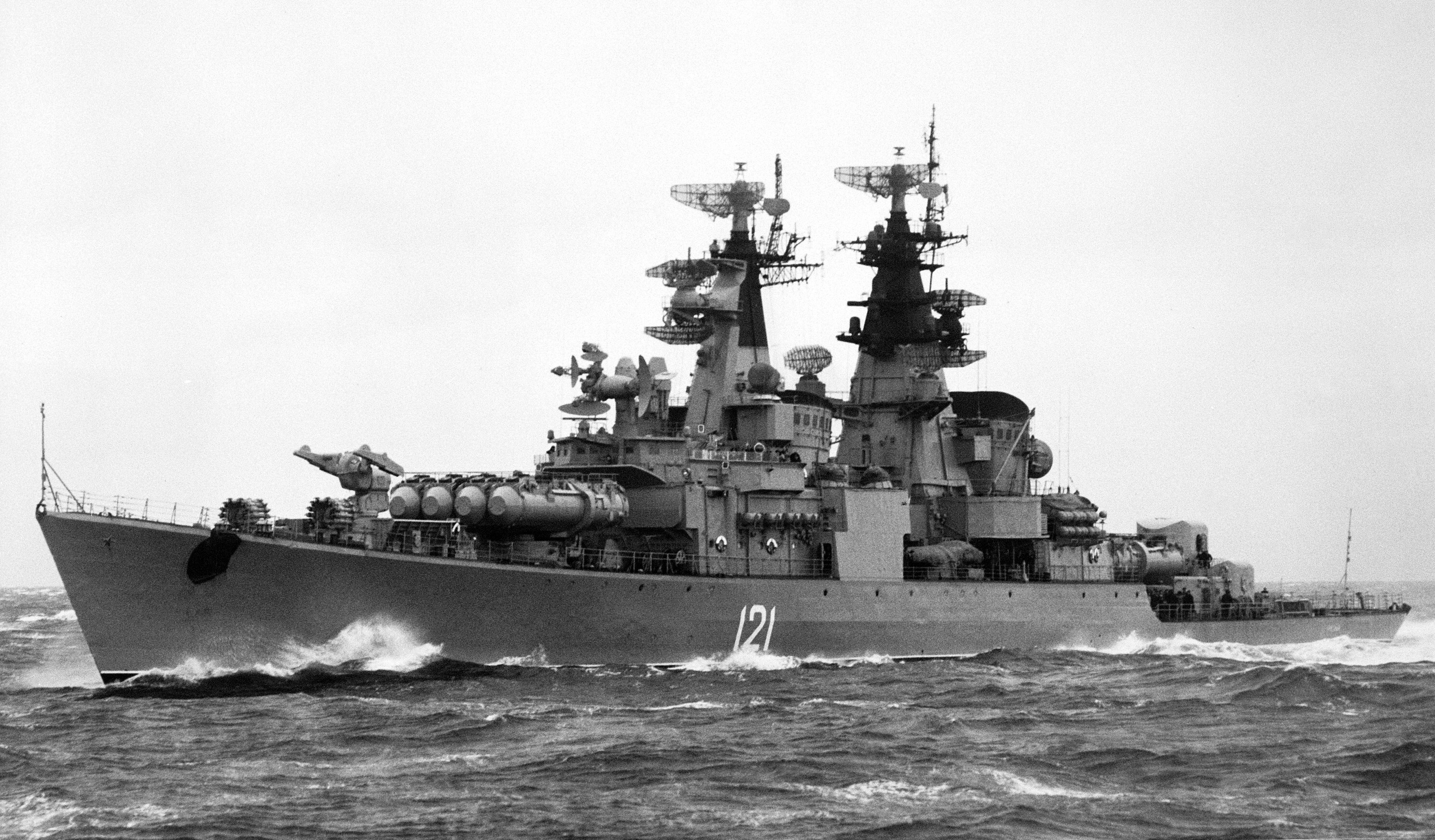
Project 58 guided missile cruiser. Mediterranean Sea, 1985-1986

Raketnyi kreiser \ «ракетный крейсер» (РКР).

- Kynda or Groznyy (Project 58) class (4 units). Classified as destroyers until 1962, this reason «destroyers'» names were replaced by «cruisers'» (but Groznyy)
  - Groznyy \ «Грозный» (1961) - Decommissioned 1991, BU 1993
  - Vladivostok \ «Владивосток» (ex-Stereguschii \ «Стерегущий» - renamed during completion) (1961) - Renamed Admiral Fokin \ «Адмирал Фокин» 1964, decommissioned 1993
  - Admiral Golovko \ «Адмирал Головко» (ex-Doblestnyi \ «Доблестный» - renamed on slip) (1962) - Decommissioned 1998-99
  - Guards cruiser Varyag \ «Варяг» (ex-Soobrazitel‘nyi \ «Сообразительный») (1963) - Decommissioned 1990, BU 1992
- Admiral Zozulya or Kresta I (Project 1134) class (4 units). Classified as Large Antisubmarine Ships until 1977. Something medium between cruisers and frigates
  - Admiral Zozulya \ «Адмирал Зозуля» (1965) - Decommissioned 1994 and BU
  - Vize-Admiral Drozd \ «Вице-адмирал Дрозд» (1966) - Decommissioned 1990, sank when towing for BU 1992
  - Vladivostok \ «Владивосток» (1966) - Decommissioned 1991 and sold for BU
  - Sevastopol \ «Севастополь» (1967) - Decommissioned 1989, BU 1991

NOTE: Large antisubmarine ships of Project 1134a (NATO codename Kresta II) and Project 1134b (Kara) never classified as cruisers in the Soviet Navy, nor were cruisers in reality: it was a type of large frigates (due to arming of antisubmarine torpedo-missiles).

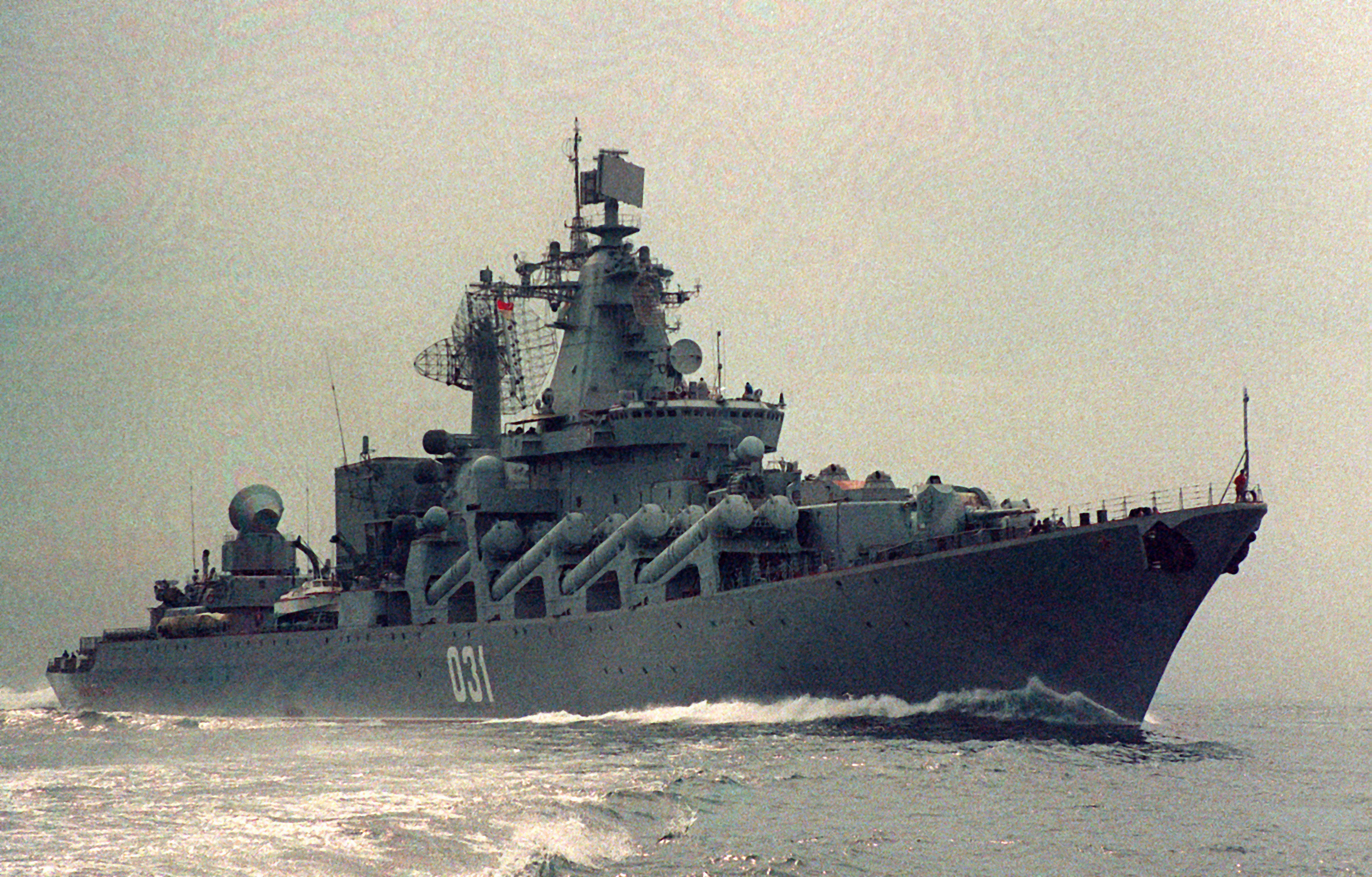
Guided missile cruiser Chervona Ukraina underway en route to the Pacific Ocean from the Black Sea. 1990

- Slava (Project 1164) class (4 units, commissioned 3, lost 1)
  - Slava \ «Слава» (1979) - Renamed Moskva \ «Москва» 1995. Guards cruiser since 1998. Sunk 2022.
  - Admiral flota Lobov \ «Адмирал флота Лобов» (1982) - Renamed Marshal Ustinov \ «Маршал Устинов» 1986
  - Chervona Ukrayina \ «Червона Украина» (1983) - Renamed Varyag \ «Варяг» 1995. Guards cruiser since 1996.
  - Admiral Flota Lobov \ «Адмирал флота Лобов» (ex-Komsomolets \ «Комсомолец» - renamed on slip) (1990) - Slowly being completed for the Ukrainian Navy, renamed Galichina \ «Галичина» 1993, renamed Ukraina \ «Україна» 1998

=== Heavy nuclear guided missile cruisers (TARKR) ===
Tyazhelyi atomnyi raketnyi kreiser \ «тяжёлый атомный ракетный крейсер» (ТАРКР). Were reclassified to Heavy Guided Missile Cruisers (TRKR) in 1997.

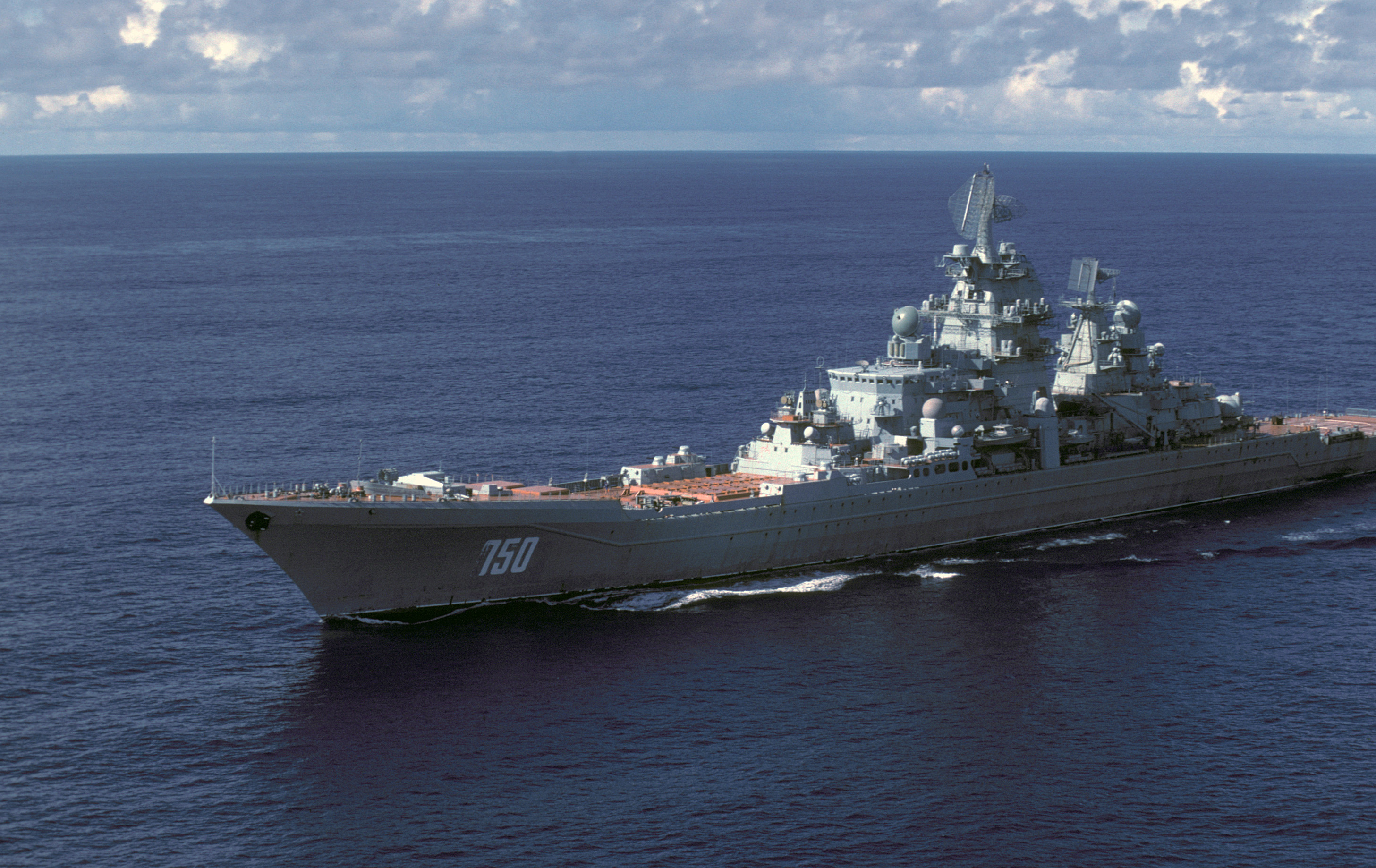
Heavy nuclear guided missile cruiser Frunze. 1985

- Kirov (Project 1142.2) class (4 units)
  - Kirov \ «Киров» (1977) (Project 1144) - Renamed Admiral Ushakov \ «Адмирал Ушаков» 1992, laid up 1990
  - Frunze \ «Фрунзе» (1981) - Renamed Admiral Lazarev \ «Адмирал Лазарев» 1992, laid up 1991
  - Kalinin \ «Калинин» (1986) - Renamed Admiral Nakhimov \ «Адмирал Нахимов» 1992
  - Yuri Andropov \ «Юрий Андропов» (1989) - Renamed Petr Velikiy \ «Пётр Великий» 1992

=== Antisubmarine cruisers (PKR) ===
Protivolodochnyi kreiser \ «противолодочный крейсер» (ПКР). Helicopter-carrying cruisers. Ships were purposed to searching and destroying opponent's guided missile and multi-purpose submarines at the remote boundaries of antisubmarine defence, consisting of ships' squadrons and cooperating with other antisubmarine ships and aircraft.

- Moskva (Project 1123) class (2 units)
  - Moskva \ «Москва» - Decommissioned 1995 and sold for BU
  - Leningrad \ «Ленинград» - Decommissioned 1991, sank when towing for BU 1994

=== Heavy aircraft-carrying cruisers (TAKR) ===
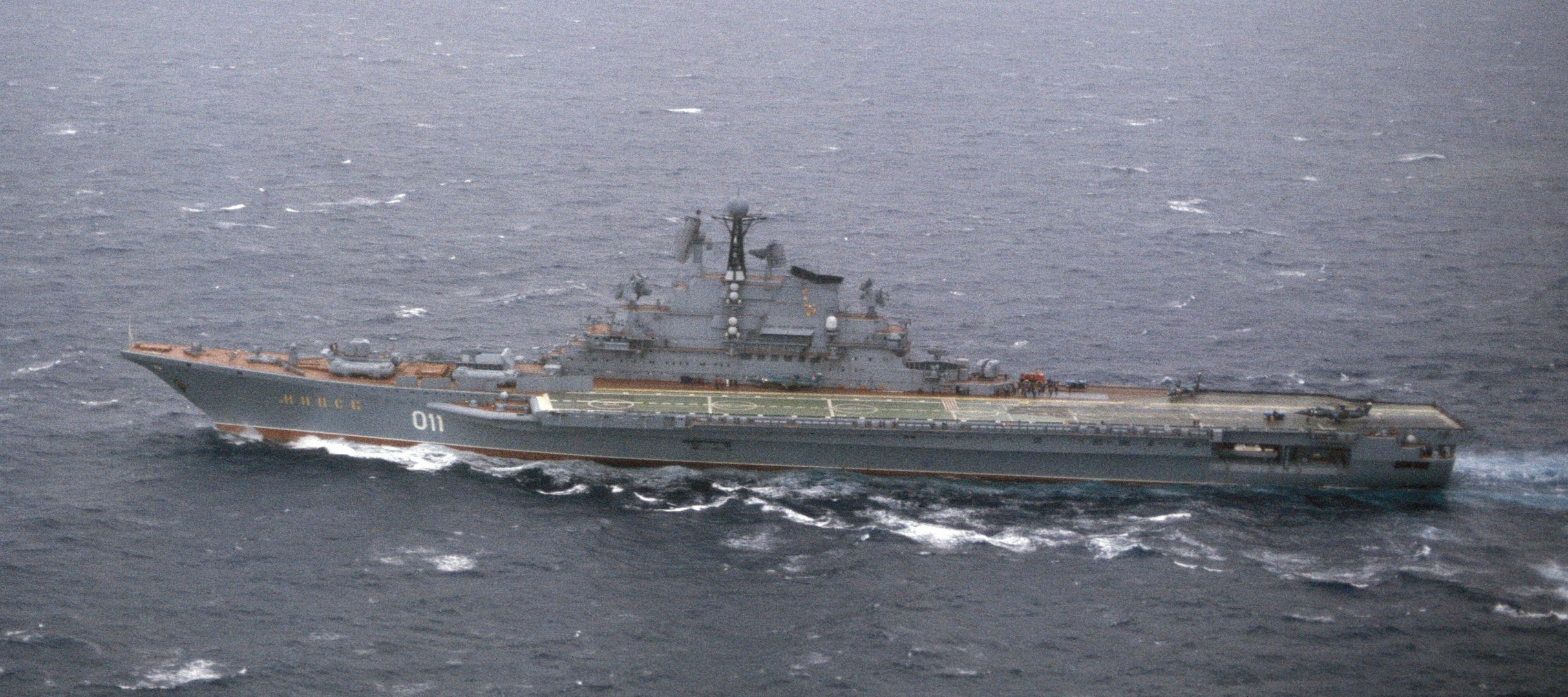
Heavy aircraft-carrying cruiser Minsk. 1983

Tyazhelyi avianesushchii kreiser \ «тяжёлый авианесущий крейсер» (ТАКР). Ships were purposed to air cover of patrol regions of Soviet ballistic missile submarines (to destroy opponent's antisubmarine helicopters and airplanes), as well as searching and destroying opponent's guided missile & multi-purpose submarines and (3rd purpose) to striking the opponent's above-water ships by guided missiles, consisting of ships' squadrons and cooperating with other fleets' forces. Despite the superficial resemblance, they were not aircraft carriers in that sense, in which this term is applicable to American and British carriers. They were not intended to be the main shock force of the Navy, but only a part of own strategic submarines' defense system (first three units). Fourth ship really became a large training base for fifth, her aircraft (Yak-141) was not completed and she remained with helicopters only, i.e. as antisubmarine cruiser. Fifth unit (and uncompleted sixth) were designed as ships of transitional type, and only seventh, non-completed nuclear Ulyanovsk, although classified officially to cruisers, could become a first Russian relatively full aircraft carrier.

- Kiev (Project 1143) class (3 units). Classified originally as Antisubmarine Aircraft-Carrying Cruisers, since 1977 (most part of their career) – to Heavy Aircraft-carrying Cruisers, since 1991 (after decommissioning of their Yak-38 aircraft) — to Heavy Helicopter-carrying Cruisers.
  - Kiev \ «Киев» (1972) - Decommissioned 1993, sold for BU to China 2000, resold and became a part of military theme park in Tianjin (2003)
  - Minsk \ «Минск» (1975) - Decommissioned 1993, sold for BU to South Korea, resold and became a part of military theme park in Shenzhen (2003)
  - Novorossiysk (1978) (Project 1143.3) \ «Новороссийск» - Laid up 1991, decommissioned 1993, sold for BU 1994 to South Korea
- Baku \ «Баку» (1982) (Project 1143.4) - Renamed Admiral Flota Sovetskogo Soyuza Gorshkov \ «Адмирал Флота Советского Союза Горшков» (non-officially Admiral Gorshkov, unceremoniously — Gorshok) 1991, burnt 1993 & 1994, laid up 1996, sold to India and renamed INS Vikramaditya 2004

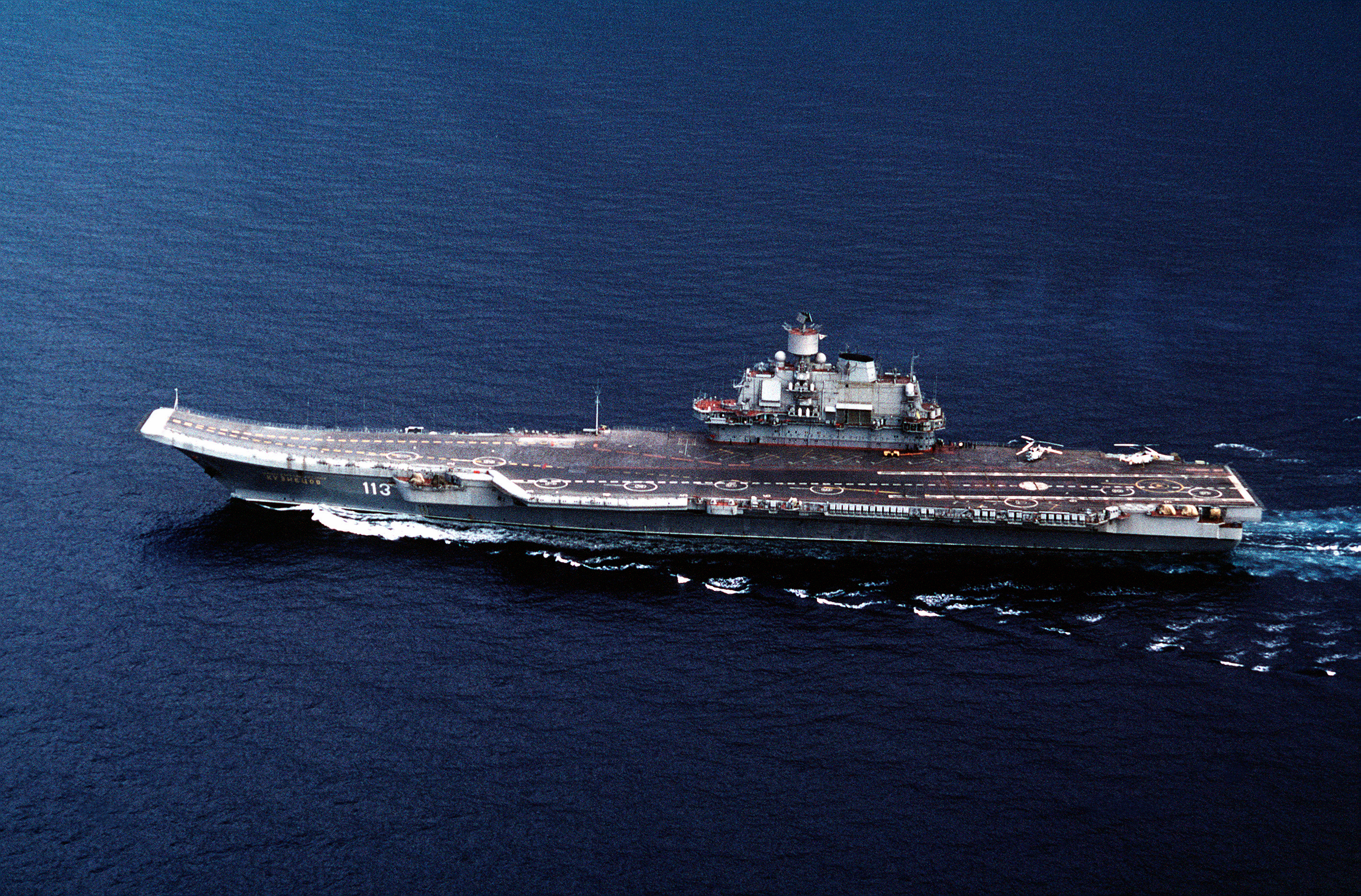
Heavy aircraft-carrying cruiser Admiral Flota Sovetskogo Soyuza Kuznetsov underway south of Italy. 1991

- Kuznetsov (Project 1143.5) class (2 units)
  - Tbilisi \ «Тбилиси» (ex-Leonid Brezhnev \ «Леонид Брежнев», ex-Riga \ «Рига» - renamed on slip) (1985) - Renamed Admiral Flota Sovetskogo Soyuza Kuznetsov \ «Адмирал Флота Советского Союза Кузнецов» (non-officially Admiral Kuznetsov, unceremoniously — Kuzya) 1990, operated at Mediterranean Sea 1995–1996
  - Riga \ «Рига» (1988) - Renamed Varyag \ «Варяг» 1990, laid up 1992, being incomplete sold by Ukraine to People's Liberation Army Navy, towed to China 2002, commissioned as Liaoning 2012.
- Ulyanovsk \ «Ульяновск» (Project 1143.7) - Laid down 1988, not completed and BU 1992

=== Auxiliary cruisers (VKR) ===
Vspomogatel'nyi kreiser \ «Вспомогательный крейсер» (ВКР).

- Venture \ «Вентюр» (1899, ex-steamer) - Mobilized by White Army at Caspian Sea 1918, voluntary joined Red Army and renamed Avstraliya \ «Австралия» (later Bela Kun \ «Бела Кун») 1920, decommissioned 1920
- Aga Selim \ «Ага Селим» (1897; ex-tanker) - Mobilized at Caspian Sea 1918, renamed Rosa Luxemburg \ «Роза Люксембург» 1919, decommissioned 1926
- Bambak \ «Бамбак» (1894; ex-steamer) - Mobilized at Caspian Sea 1918, renamed Ilyich \ «Ильич» 1919, decommissioned 1920
- Delo \ «Дело» (1908; ex-tanker) - Mobilized 1918, renamed III Internatsional \ «III Интернационал» 1919, decommissioned 1920
- Dublin Castle \ «Дублин Кастл» (1897; ex-tanker Yupiter \ «Юпитер») - Mobilized by White Army at Caspian Sea 1918, captured 1920, renamed Evropa \ «Европа», decommissioned 1920
- Kolomna \ «Коломна» (1888; ex-steamer) - Mobilized at Caspian Sea 1918, renamed Krasnoye Znamia \ «Красное Знамя» 1919, decommissioned 1920
- Makarov I \ «Макаров I» (1898; ex-towboat) - Mobilized at Caspian Sea 1918, renamed Proletarii \ «Пролетарий» 1919, decommissioned 1920
- Slava \ «Слава» (1903; ex-steamer) - Mobilized at Caspian Sea 1918, renamed Krasnoye Znamia \ «Красное Знамя» 1919, decommissioned 1920
- Indigirka \ «Индигирка» (1918; ex-netlayer) - Mobilized at Volga River 1919, renamed Leitenant Schmidt \ «Лейтенант Шмидт» 1920, decommissioned 1923
- Kaspii \ «Каспий» (1914; ex-ice-breaker) - Mobilized at Caspian Sea 1918, wrecked 1920, refloated 1935
- Pushkin \ «Пушкин» (1893; ex-steamer) - Mobilized by White Army at Caspian Sea 1919, captured 1920, renamed Sovetskii Azerbaydzhan \ «Советский Азербайджан», decommissioned 1921
- Ivan Susanin \ «Иван Сусанин» (1899; ex-Canadian ice-breaker Minto, purchased by Imperial Russi) - Mobilized at White Sea 1920, decommissioned 1920, renamed Leitenant Dreyer \ «Лейтенант Дрейер» 1920, wrecked 1922
- Kanada \ «Канада» (1909; ex-Canadian ice-breaker Earl Grey, purchased by Imperial Russia) - Mobilized at White Sea 1920, renamed Tretii Internatsional \ «Третий Интернационал», decommissioned 1921, renamed Fyodor Litke \ «Фёдор Литке», BU 1958
- Kniaz‘ Pozarskii \ «Князь Пожарский» (1916; ex-ice-breaker) - Mobilized at White Sea 1920, renamed Leitenant Schmidt \ «Лейтенант Шмидт», decommissioned and renamed Stepan Makarov \ «Степан Макаров» 1921, sank 1941
- Indigirka \ «Индигирка» (1886; ex-Dobroflot steamer Tsinanfu \ «Цинанфу») - Mobilized at Far East 1923, decommissioned 1933
- Oleg \ «Олег» (1896; ex-steamer Pronto) - Mobilized at Far East 1922, decommissioned 1923, BU 1951
- Stavropol‘ \ «Ставрополь» (1907; ex-Dobroflot steamer Kotik \ «Котик») - Mobilized at Far East 1922, decommissioned 1923, renamed Voroshilovsk \ «Ворошиловск» 1935, BU 1951
- Mikoyan \ «Микоян» (1935; ex-ice-breaker O. Yu. Shmidt \ «О. Ю. Шмидт») - Mobilized in June 1941, decommissioned in November 1941 and returned to ice-breakers class, renamed A. Mikoyan \ «А. Микоян», transferred from Black Sea to Arkhangelsk 1941–1942
