= Soviet destroyer Sposobny (1940) =

Soviet destroyer

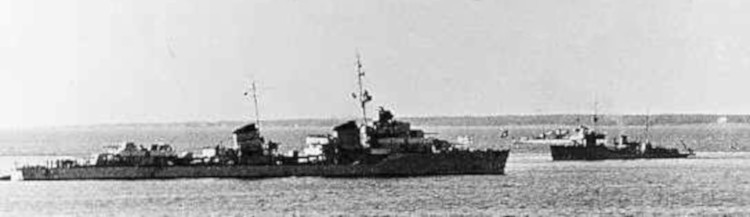
- An unidentified Storozhevoy-class destroyer in the Black Sea

History

Soviet Union
- Name: Sposobny (Способный (Capable))
- Ordered: 2nd Five-Year Plan
- Builder: Shipyard No. 200 (named after 61 Communards), Nikolayev
- Yard number: 1076
- Laid down: 7 March 1939
- Launched: 30 September 1939
- Commissioned: 24 June 1941
- Fate: Sunk by aircraft, 6 October 1943

General characteristics
- Class & type: Storozhevoy-class destroyer
- Displacement: 1,727 t (1,700 long tons) (standard); 2,279 t (2,243 long tons) (full load)
- Length: 112.5 m (369 ft 1 in) (o/a)
- Beam: 10.2 m (33 ft 6 in)
- Draft: 3.98 m (13 ft 1 in)
- Installed power: 4 water-tube boilers; 54,000 shp (40,000 kW) (trials)
- Propulsion: 2 shafts, 2 steam turbine sets
- Speed: 36.8 knots (68.2 km/h; 42.3 mph)
- Endurance: 1,380 nmi (2,560 km; 1,590 mi) at 20 knots (37 km/h; 23 mph)
- Complement: 207 (271 wartime)
- Sensors & processing systems: Mars hydrophones
- Armament: 4 × single 130 mm (5.1 in) guns; 2 × single 76.2 mm (3 in) AA guns; 3 × single 45 mm (1.8 in) AA guns; 4 × single 12.7 mm (0.5 in) DK or DShK machine guns; 2 × triple 533 mm (21 in) torpedo tubes; 58–96 mines; 30 depth charges

Sposobny (Russian: Способный, lit. 'Capable') was one of 18 Storozhevoy-class destroyers (officially known as Project 7U destroyers) built for the Soviet Navy during the late 1930s. Although she began construction as a Project 7 Gnevny-class destroyer, Sposobny was completed in 1941 to the modified Project 7U design and assigned to the Black Sea Fleet.

During the Sieges of Odessa and Sevastopol in 1941–1942, the ship escorted convoys to and from those cities and provided naval gunfire support to the defenders. Sposobny struck a mine in early 1942 and had to be towed back to port for repairs. She was further damaged by bombs while still under repair in April 1942 and these were not completed until mid-1943. After a failed attempt to intercept German convoys off the Crimea, the ship and two other destroyers were attacked by German aircraft. After repeated attacks, the other two were sunk first and Sposobny was sunk while trying to rescue their survivors.

== Design and description ==
Originally built as a Gnevny-class ship, Sposobny and her sister ships were completed to the modified Project 7U design after Joseph Stalin, General Secretary of the Communist Party of the Soviet Union, ordered that the latter be built with their boilers arranged en echelon, instead of linked as in the Gnevnys, so that a ship could still move with one or two boilers disabled.

Like the Gnevnys, the Project 7U destroyers had an overall length of 112.5 meters (369 ft 1 in) and a beam of 10.2 meters (33 ft 6 in), but they had a reduced draft of 3.98 meters (13 ft 1 in) at deep load. The ships were slightly overweight, displacing 1,727 metric tons (1,700 long tons) at standard load and 2,279 metric tons (2,243 long tons) at deep load. The crew complement of the Storozhevoy class numbered 207 in peacetime, but this increased to 271 in wartime, as more personnel were needed to operate additional equipment. Each ship had a pair of geared steam turbines, each driving one propeller, rated to produce 54,000 shaft horsepower (40,000 kW) using steam from four water-tube boilers, which the designers expected would exceed the 37-knot (69 km/h; 43 mph) speed of the Project 7s because there was additional steam available. Sposobny herself only reached 36.8 knots (68.2 km/h; 42.3 mph) during her sea trials in 1943. Variations in fuel oil capacity meant that the range of the Project 7Us varied from 1,380 to 2,700 nautical miles (2,560 to 5,000 km; 1,590 to 3,110 mi) at 19 knots (35 km/h; 22 mph); Sposobny reached 1,380 nmi (2,560 km; 1,590 mi) at 20 knots (37 km/h; 23 mph).

The Project 7U-class ships mounted four 130-millimeter (5.1 in) B-13 guns in two pairs of superfiring single mounts fore and aft of the superstructure. Anti-aircraft defense was provided by a pair of 76.2-millimeter (3 in) 34-K AA guns in single mounts and three 45-millimeter (1.8 in) 21-K AA guns, as well as four 12.7-millimeter (0.5 in) DK or DShK machine guns. They carried six 533 mm (21 in) torpedo tubes in two rotating triple mounts amidships. The ships could also carry a maximum of 58 to 96 mines and 30 depth charges. They were fitted with a set of Mars hydrophones for anti-submarine work, although these were useless at speeds over 3 knots (5.6 km/h; 3.5 mph).

=== Modifications ===
During 1942–1943 repairs, as a result of a need for increased AA armament due to air attacks, the 45 mm guns aboard Sposobny were replaced by seven single 37-millimeter (1.5 in) 70-K AA guns, in addition to two twin-gun mounts for 12.7 mm M2 Browning machine guns and two BMB-1 depth charge launchers. She also received Lend-Lease Asdic sonar (designated Drakon-128s by the Soviets) during this period.

== Construction and career ==
Sposobny was laid down in Shipyard No. 200 (named after 61 Communards) in Nikolayev as yard number 1076 on 7 July 1936 as a Gnevny-class destroyer with the name Podvizhny. She was relaid down as a Project 7U destroyer on 7 March 1939, and launched on 30 September of that year. The ship was renamed Sposobny on 25 September 1940 and had her hull dented by ice while undergoing mooring trials in January before running aground while being towed by an icebreaker. After repairs in Odessa, Sposobny arrived in Sevastopol for shipyard tests on 1 March 1941, with state acceptance tests beginning on 13 April. She was commissioned into the Black Sea Fleet on 24 June 1941, two days after the start of the German invasion of the Soviet Union (Operation Barbarossa) ended the tests. Sposobny was assigned to the 3rd Destroyer Division of the fleet Light Forces Detachment together with her completed sisters. During her first two months of service, the destroyer escorted transports, while her crew trained on the operation of equipment.

On 21 August, the ship was one of those ships assigned to provide support for the defenders of Odessa, her first combat operation. On 7 September, Sposobny and the destroyer Boyky escorted the Commander of the Black Sea Fleet, Vice Admiral Filipp Oktyabrsky, aboard the destroyer leader Kharkov, to Odessa. While they were present, all three ships bombarded Romanian troops; Sposobny firing 28 shells from her main guns. Four days later, the ship fired 49 shells at Romanian targets. During this period she also expended 64 76 mm and 135 45 mm rounds against Axis aircraft. On 16–21 September the destroyer helped to escort transports ferrying the 157th Rifle Division to Odessa. At the beginning of November, Sposobny started escorting supply and troop convoys to and from encircled Sevastopol and supporting Soviet troops with her guns. She suffered minor storm damage on 27 November, firing 292 shells between 4 and 8 December and 329 shells between 23 and 24 December against German positions besieging Sevastopol. Between 28 and 30 December, she covered the amphibious landings at Kerch and Feodosia.

Sposobny ferried supplies from Novorossiysk to Sevastopol on 1 January 1942 and bombarded Axis troops near Feodosia two days later. On 4 January, the destroyer escorted the light cruiser Krasny Kavkaz to Tuapse after she had been badly damaged by German dive bombers. Sposobny landed 217 soldiers of the reinforced 226th Mountain Rifle Regiment of the 63rd Mountain Rifle Division at Sudak on 6 January and fired ninety-five 130 mm shells in support of the landing. While transporting 300 soldiers to Feodosia on the 8th, she struck a Soviet mine that blew off her bow, killing 20 crewmen and 86 soldiers. Her propeller shafts were misaligned by the explosion and one screw lost blades when it caught on the sinking bow, in addition to hull damage. The ship was able to proceed under her own steam stern-first towards Novorossiysk, but was taken under tow by the destroyer Zheleznyakov the next day. While under repair in Novorossiysk on 10 April, Sposobny was badly damaged by bomb splinters that ignited some 130 mm rounds and started several fires, killing 41 men and wounding 45.

The ship was towed to Tuapse on 22 April by the destroyer Nezamozhnik, where repairs were begun by Shipyard No. 201, evacuated from Sevastopol. The production of a new bow began on 24 June, but the German advance into the Caucasus forced the evacuation of the shipyard to Poti, where Sposobny was towed by the rescue tug Merkury between 9 and 12 August. The new bow arrived on 7 September and was attached to her in drydock by the end of the year. Taken out of drydock on 29 December, the destroyer returned to service after the completion of repairs in mid-May 1943. From mid- to late-1943, she escorted transports and other warships, including the cruiser Krasny Kavkaz, between bases. Together with Boyky and her sister Soobrazitelny, she departed Batumi on 26 August to lay mines off the Axis-held coast, but returned to base after being discovered en route by a German reconnaissance aircraft.

Together with Boyky and the destroyer Besposhchadny, the ship made an unsuccessful attempt on 30 September to intercept German transports evacuating troops and equipment from the Kuban Bridgehead. During the night of 5/6 October, Kharkov and the destroyers Besposhchadny and Sposobny attempted to intercept German evacuation convoys off the Crimean coast, but were again unsuccessful. Kharkov bombarded Yalta and Alushta while the two smaller destroyers steamed to do the same to Feodosia. The latter pair were attacked by five S-boats of the 1st S-Boat Flotilla en route. The Germans failed to damage either destroyer and Sposobny claimed one hit by one of her 45 mm guns on S-45. On their way home the three ships were spotted by German reconnaissance aircraft and were attacked by Junkers Ju 87 Stuka dive bombers of III./StG 3 beginning on the morning of 6 October. Kharkov was damaged by their first attack and had to be towed by Sposobny. The second attack heavily damaged Besposhchadny despite Soviet fighter cover and Sposobny alternated towing her and Kharkov. The crew of Kharkov managed to return a boiler to operation around 14:00, but a third raid ten minutes later sank Besposhchadny and knocked out power aboard Sposobny with two near misses. Her crew managed to return to operation in a half hour, but the next attack sank Kharkov at 15:37. Sposobny spent two hours rescuing survivors, but was herself sunk by the fifth wave, which scored three direct hits. Hundreds of sailors were lost with the three ships, and the incident prompted Stalin to issue an order forbidding the use of ships destroyer-sized and larger without his express permission.

== Sources ==
- Balakin, Sergey (2007). Легендарные "семёрки" Эсминцы "сталинской" серии [Legendary Sevens: Stalin's Destroyer Series] (in Russian). Moscow: Yauza/Eksmo. ISBN 978-5-699-23784-5.
- Berezhnoy, Sergey (2002). Крейсера и миноносцы. Справочник [Guide to Cruisers and Destroyers] (in Russian). Moscow: Voenizdat. ISBN 5-203-01780-8.
- Hill, Alexander (2018). Soviet Destroyers of World War II. New Vanguard. Vol. 256. Oxford, UK: Osprey Publishing. ISBN 978-1-4728-2256-7.
- Khorkov, Geliy (1981). Советские надводные корабли в Великой Отечественной войне [Soviet Surface Ships in the Great Patriotic War] (in Russian). Moscow: Voenizdat. OCLC 10593895.
- Platonov, Andrey V. (2002). Энциклопедия советских надводных кораблей 1941–1945 [Encyclopedia of Soviet Surface Ships 1941–1945] (in Russian). Saint Petersburg: Poligon. ISBN 5-89173-178-9.
- Rohwer, Jürgen (2005). Chronology of the War at Sea 1939–1945: The Naval History of World War Two (Third Revised ed.). Annapolis, Maryland: Naval Institute Press. ISBN 1-59114-119-2.
- Rohwer, Jürgen & Monakov, Mikhail S. (2001). Stalin's Ocean-Going Fleet. London: Frank Cass. ISBN 0-7146-4895-7.
- Yakubov, Vladimir & Worth, Richard (2008). "The Soviet Project 7/7U Destroyers". In Jordan, John & Dent, Stephen (eds.). Warship 2008. London: Conway. pp. 99–114. ISBN 978-1-84486-062-3.
