= Soviet cruiser Krasny Kavkaz =

Soviet Navy's Admiral Nakhimov-class cruiser

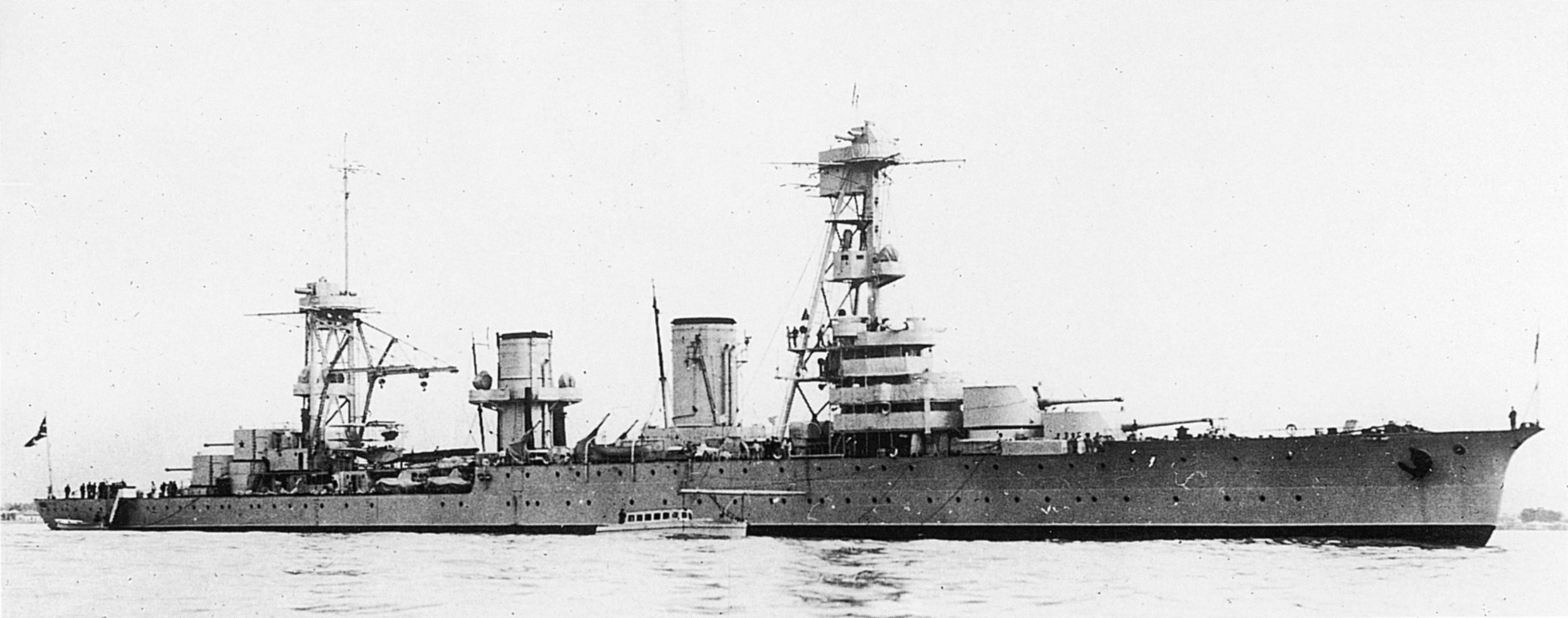
- Krasny Kavkaz in the 1930s

History

Soviet Union
- Name: Krasny Kavkaz
- Builder: Russud Dockyard, Nikolayev
- Laid down: 31 October 1913
- Launched: 21 June 1916
- Acquired: November 1917
- Commissioned: 25 January 1932
- Renamed: 14 December 1926 from Admiral Lazarev
- Reclassified: 12 May 1947 as a training ship
- Honours and awards: Awarded the Guards title, 3 April 1942
- Fate: Sunk as target, 21 November 1952

General characteristics (in 1940)
- Class & type: Admiral Nakhimov-class cruiser
- Displacement: 7,560 t (7,441 long tons) (standard); 9,030 t (8,887 long tons) (full load)
- Length: 170 m (557 ft 9 in)
- Beam: 15.7 m (51 ft 6 in)
- Draught: 6.6 m (21 ft 8 in)
- Installed power: 10 Yarrow boilers; 55,000 shp (41,000 kW)
- Propulsion: 4 shafts, 4 geared steam turbines
- Speed: 29 knots (54 km/h; 33 mph)
- Range: 3,500 nmi (6,500 km; 4,000 mi) at 15 knots (28 km/h; 17 mph)
- Complement: 878
- Armament: 4 × 1 – 180 mm (7.1 in) guns; 4 × 2 – 100 mm (3.9 in) AA guns; 2 × 1 – 76 mm AA guns; 4 × 1 – 45 mm (1.8 in) AA guns; 4 × 1 – 12.7 mm (0.50 in) AA machine guns; 4 × 3 – 533 mm (21 in) torpedo tubes; 60–120 mines
- Armour: Upper and lower armoured decks: 20 mm (0.79 in) each; Turrets: 76 mm (3.0 in); Lower armour belt: 76 mm (3.0 in); Upper armour belt: 25 mm (0.98 in); Conning tower: 76 mm (3.0 in)
- Aircraft carried: 2 × KOR-1 seaplanes
- Aviation facilities: 1 catapult

Krasny Kavkaz (from Russian: "Красный Кавказ" – "Red Caucasus") was a cruiser of the Soviet Navy that began construction during World War I, but was still incomplete during the Russian Revolution. Her design was heavily modified by the Soviets, and she was completed in 1932. During World War II she supported Soviet troops during the siege of Odessa, siege of Sevastopol, and the Kerch–Feodosiya operation in the winter of 1941–42. She was awarded the Guards title on 3 April 1942. She was reclassified as a training ship in May 1947 before being expended as a target in 1952.

== Service history ==
Laid down on 18 October 1913 at the Rossud Dockyard as Admiral Lazarev for the Imperial Russian Navy as a cruiser of the Admiral Nakhimov class, she was launched on 8 June 1916. Construction was abandoned in 1917 during the October Revolution when the ship was 63% complete. In the second half of 1918, the Marine Department of Hetman Pavlo Skoropadskyi was engaged in completion of ship. On 25 January 1919, the ship was formally renamed in "Hetman Petro Doroshenko", but Mykolaiv was captured shortly afterward by the Entente. The hull was relatively undamaged and the Soviets decided to finish the ship to a modified design. She was renamed Krasny Kavkaz on 14 December 1926, and completed to a modernized design, being commissioned on 25 January 1932.

Krasny Kavkaz was initially intended to accommodate eight 8-inch (203 mm) guns in four twin turrets, but this was impossible given her small and lightly constructed hull. Three twin turrets mounting the new 57-caliber 180 mm (7.1 in) B-1-K gun under development also proved impracticable and the Soviets had to settle for four MK-1-180 single 180 mm gun turrets, two at each end. Her superstructure was massively revised to accommodate these turrets and all of the original casemated 130-millimeter (5.1 in) B7 Pattern 1913 guns were removed. As completed her secondary armament was only four 30-caliber 76.2 mm Lender AA guns mounted between her funnels. Her original internal torpedo tubes were replaced by four triple 533-millimetre (21 in) torpedo mounts mounted on each side of the main deck abaft the forecastle break. She was given an aircraft-handling crane, but a catapult wasn't installed aft of her rear funnel until 1935 when a Heinkel catapult was imported from Germany. She was also fitted for mine rails with a capacity of up to 120 mines.

The light cruiser Komintern collided with her in May 1932, shortly after her commissioning, and badly damaged her bow. It was extensively rebuilt and increased her overall length by over 11 metres (36 ft). In 1933 she made port visits in Turkey, Greece and Italy.

She was refitted before Operation Barbarossa, probably about 1940, her catapult was removed, and her anti-aircraft armament was greatly increased. Her four 76.2 mm Lender AA guns were exchanged for four Italian Minizini twin gun 100 mm (4 in) 47 caliber guns and she received four single mounts for the semi-automatic 76.2 mm (3.00 in) 34-K guns as well as six 12.7 mm (0.50 in) AA machine guns. Two single mounts for 34-K guns were also fitted, one on each side of the quarterdeck just aft of the rearmost main gun turret. Some of these guns may have been received earlier, the sources are unclear. While under repair at Poti in late 1942 she landed her aft pair of torpedo tubes and received two more Minizini mounts salvaged from the sunken cruiser Chervona Ukraina. Ten single mounts for the naval version of the 37 mm AA gun was also fitted. By 1944 she was also carrying one quadruple Vickers .50 machine gun MK III mount on top of each of her superfiring main gun turrets and she may have been using Oerlikon 20 mm cannon.

=== World War II ===
Commander of the Krasny Kavkaz's electro-mechanical department Engineer Captain 3rd rank Grigory Ilyich Kupets in the cruiser's wheelhouse, May 1942

Krasny Kavkaz, in company with the cruisers Chervona Ukraina, Komintern and a number of destroyers, laid down a defensive mine barrage protecting the Black Sea Fleet base at Sevastopol on 22 June. She provided gunfire support to Soviet forces defending Odessa and escorted convoys bringing the 157th Rifle Division into Odessa during the month of September 1941. She also transported one battalion of the 3rd Marine Regiment from Sevastopol in a successful amphibious assault behind Romanian lines to destroy Romanian coastal batteries near Fontanka and Dofinovka. She escorted convoys from 3–6 October that evacuated the 157th Rifle Division from Odessa to Sevastopol and escorted the final evacuation convoy during the night of 15–16 October. During the siege of Sevastopol she provided gunfire support and evacuated cut-off troops from elsewhere in the Crimea into Sevastopol and brought in reinforcements from Caucasian ports. She helped to transport the 388th Rifle Division from Novorossiysk and Tuapse to Sevastopol between 7 and 13 December and the 354th Rifle Division between 21 and 22 December, bombarding German positions in the interim.

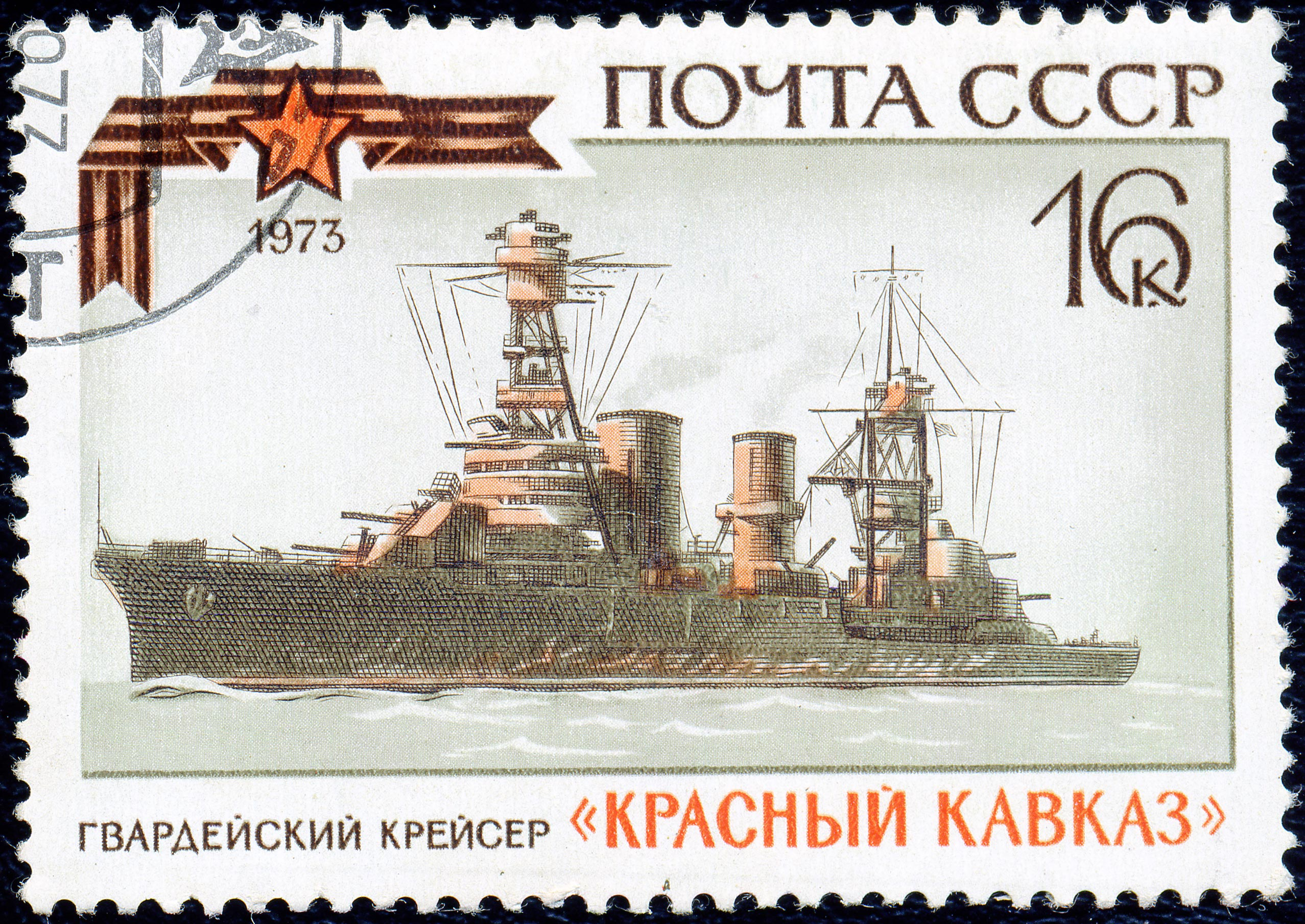
Krasny Kavkaz as depicted on a 1973 postage stamp

During the Kerch–Feodosiya operation, Krasny Kavkaz sailed into the harbor of Feodosiya on 29 December 1941 and disembarked reinforcements and provided gunfire support for Soviet troops already ashore. She was hit seventeen times by Axis artillery and mortar fire in retaliation. On 1 and 3 January she ferried supplies and reinforcements for the Soviet bridgehead on the Kerch Peninsula. On the return voyage she was severely damaged by German Junkers Ju 87 Stuka dive-bombers from II./StG 77. Four near-misses close to her stern damaged her steering, her left propeller shaft, blew off one propeller and put enough holes in her stern that flooding caused her draft to increase by 5 metres (16 ft). She made it to Novorossiysk, escorted by the destroyer Sposobny, where she was patched up enough to make to Poti where more permanent repairs could be made. These took until October 1942 and the opportunity was taken to reinforce her anti-aircraft armament.

She was awarded the Guards title on 3 April in recognition of her performance. Between 20 and 23 October, Krasny Kavkaz, her half-sister Krasny Krym, and three destroyers ferried 12,600 men of the 8th, 9th and 10th Guards Rifle Brigades from Poti to Tuapse to reinforce the defenses there. On the night of 4 February 1943 the Soviets made a series of amphibious landings to the west of Novorossiysk, behind German lines. Krasny Krym, Krasny Kavkaz, and three destroyers provided fire support for the main landing, but the Soviet troops there were wiped out by 6 February, although one secondary landing was successful. The loss of three destroyers attempting to interdict the German evacuation of the Taman Bridgehead on 6 October 1943 caused Stalin to forbid the deployment of large naval units without his express permission and this meant the end of Krasny Kavkaz's active participation in the war.

=== Post-war history ===
Starshina 2nd class V. Polchaninov and Red Fleet man B. Byunikov next to a .50 cal Vickers machine gun on the cruiser, 1943

Little is known about her activities after the end of the war other than she was redesignated as a training ship on 12 May 1947. Krasny Kavkaz was assigned as a target ship for testing of KS-1 Komet (AS-1 Kennel) anti-shipping missile in 1951.

Since spring 1952, Krasny Kavkaz was tested against Komet missiles with an inert charge, resulting in three neat little holes, one on the aft and two on the weights on the marine fenders, however, there was also a massive 10 m² exit hole. During these tests, Krasny Kavkaz managed to stay afloat, continuing on course. On 21 November 1952, she was put out to sea at 18 knots (33.3 km/h) and without crew to allow for the testing of a Komet anti-ship missile with a proper warhead. During testing, she sank almost instantaneously, splitting into two and sinking within three minutes. Her estimated wreck location is roughly 15 miles (24.14 km) south of Cape Chauda, on the southern tip of Feodosia Gulf.
