= Admiral Nakhimov-class cruiser =

Soviet class of light cruisers

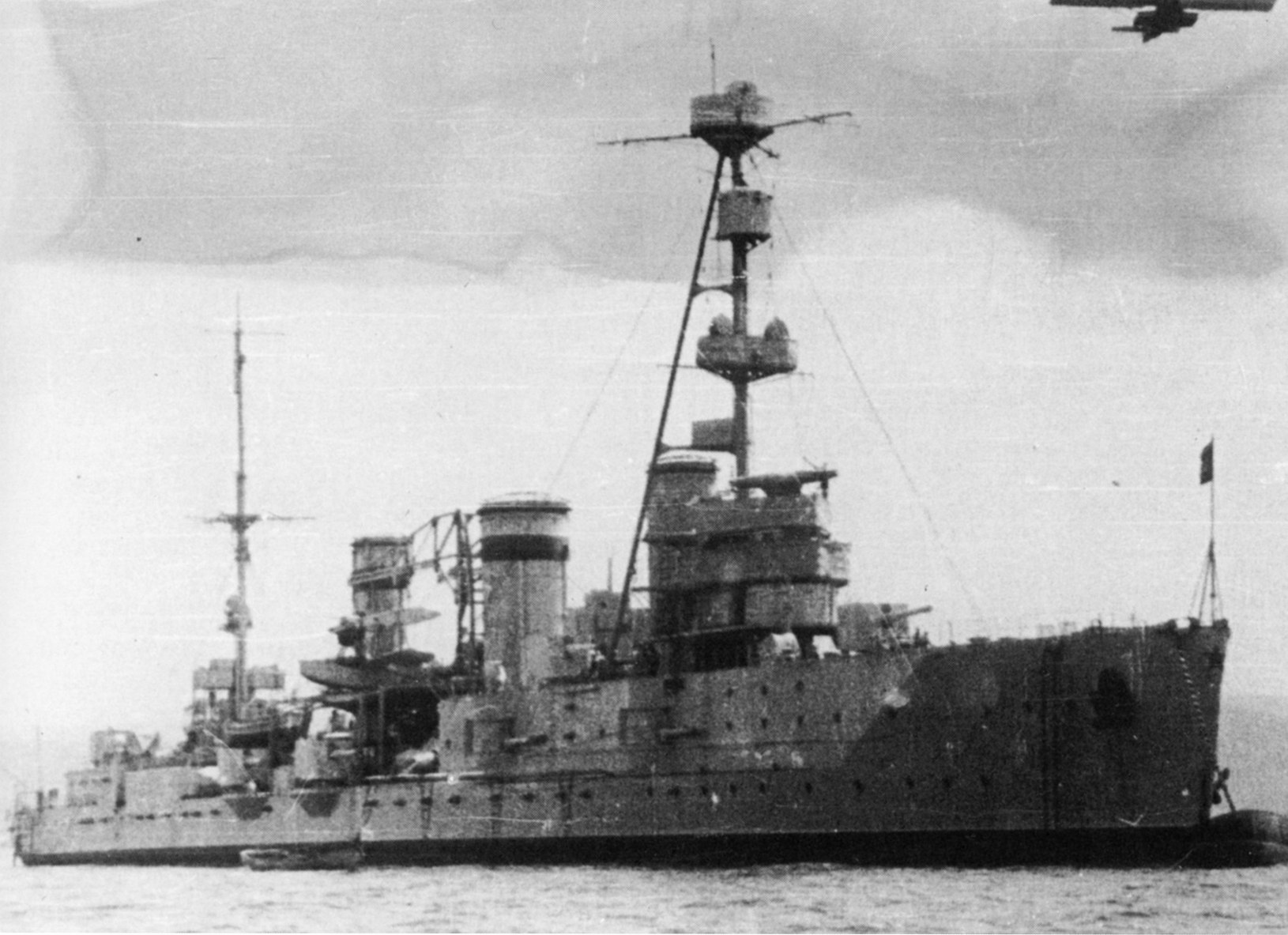
- Chervona Ukraina in 1935

Class overview
- Builders: Russud Shipyard, Nikolayev
- Operators: Soviet Navy
- Preceded by: Svetlana class
- Succeeded by: Kirov class
- Built: 1913–1932
- In commission: 1927–1952
- Planned: 4
- Completed: 2
- Lost: 1
- Scrapped: 3

General characteristics (as designed)
- Type: Light cruiser
- Displacement: 7,600 long tons (7,700 t)
- Length: 535 ft 6 in (163.2 m)
- Beam: 51 ft 6 in (15.7 m)
- Draft: 18 ft 3 in (5.6 m)
- Installed power: 14 Yarrow boilers; 55,000 shp (41,000 kW)
- Propulsion: 4 shafts; 4 geared steam turbines
- Speed: 29.5 knots (54.6 km/h; 33.9 mph)
- Range: 1,200 nmi (2,200 km; 1,400 mi) at a speed of 14 knots (26 km/h; 16 mph)
- Complement: 630
- Armament: 15 × single 130 mm (5.1 in) guns; 4 × single 63 mm (2.5 in) AA guns; 2 × single 457 mm (18 in) submerged torpedo tubes
- Armor: Waterline belt: 3 in (76 mm); Deck: 1.5 in (38 mm); Gun shields: 1 in (25 mm); Conning tower: 3 in (76 mm)
- Aircraft carried: 1 seaplane

The Admiral Nakhimov-class cruisers were a group of four light cruisers built for the Imperial Russian Navy just before World War I began in 1914. Construction was interrupted by the Russian Revolution and only two of the ships were eventually completed well after the end of the Russian Civil War by the Soviets. Chervona Ukraina was the first ship completed and was built to essentially the original design. Krasnyi Kavkaz underwent heavy modifications and was completed five years after Chervona Ukraina. Both ships participated in the Sieges of Odessa and Sevastopol after the Germans invaded Russia in June 1941. They ferried troops into the cities, evacuated wounded and bombarded the besieging German troops. Chervona Ukraina was bombed and sunk by dive bombers in November during one of these missions and Krasny Kavkaz was badly damaged by the same type of aircraft in January 1942. After her lengthy repairs were completed, the ship transported reinforcements to cities on the Black Sea coast during the Battle of the Caucasus. She was reclassified as a training ship in 1947 before she was sunk as a target in 1956. Chervona Ukraina was salvaged in 1947 and then became a hulked. She became a target ship in 1950.

== Description ==
The ships were essentially enlarged versions of the Svetlana-class cruisers, modified after consultations with the Scottish firm of John Brown & Company.

As designed, the ships displaced 7,600 long tons (7,700 t). They had a length at the waterline of 535 ft 6 in (163.2 m), a beam of 51 ft 6 in (15.7 m) and a mean draft of about 18 ft 3 in (5.6 m). They were powered by four Brown-Curtis steam turbines, each driving one shaft, which developed a total of 55,000 shaft horsepower (41,000 kW) and gave a maximum speed of 29.5 knots (54.6 km/h; 33.9 mph). The engines were powered by 14 Yarrow water-tube boilers. Four were coal-fired while the rest were mixed-firing. The ship carried a maximum of 540 long tons (550 t) of coal and an additional 690 long tons (700 t) of fuel oil that was sprayed on the coal to increase its burn rate in the mixed-firing boilers. At full capacity, she could steam for 1,200 nautical miles (2,200 km; 1,400 mi) at a speed of 14 knots (26 km/h; 16 mph). The ships' crew numbered 630 officers and men.

The ships' main armament consisted of fifteen 55-caliber 130 mm/55 B7 Pattern 1913 guns in single mounts. Six of these were mounted in casemates. Her anti-aircraft (AA) armament consisted of four 63-millimeter (2.5 in) guns. They also mounted two submerged 457-millimeter (18 in) torpedo tubes. The ships were intended to carry one seaplane.

The cruisers' waterline belt consisted of 3 inches (76 mm) of Krupp cemented armor and above it was an upper belt 1 inch (25 mm) thick. The gun shields were protected by 1 inch (25 mm) of armour. Each of the armored decks was .75 inches (19 mm) thick. The armor of the conning tower was 3 inches (76 mm) thick.

In 1917, the Naval General Staff decided to add another seaplane and a crane to handle them. It also decided to upgrade Admiral Nakhimov's anti-aircraft guns to 75-millimeter (3 in) weapons and the other ships of the class would receive 4-inch (102 mm) AA guns. Neither decision was implemented before construction was suspended.

== Ships ==
Construction data
Original name	In Soviet service	Laid down	Launched	Percent complete in 1917	Commissioned	Fate
Admiral Nakhimov, (Адмирал Нахимов)	Chervona Ukraina, (Червона Украина)	31 October 1913	6 November 1915	85%	27 February 1927	Sunk by German air raid, 12 November 1941. Salvaged, 3 November 1947, training hulk until 30 October 1950 then a target ship
Admiral Kornilov, (Адмирал Корнилов)		24 November 1914	11 November 1922	45%		Cancelled, launched to clear the slipway, scrapped, 1922–1923
Admiral Istomin, (Адмирал Истомин)		24 November 1914		40%		Cancelled, scrapped on the slipway, 1922
Admiral Lazarev, (Адмирал Лазарев)	Krasny Kavkaz, (Красный Кавказ)	31 October 1913	21 June 1916	60%	25 January 1932	Training ship, 13 May 1947, sunk as target, 21 November 1956

== Construction and modifications ==
The first pair of ships was ordered in March 1914 and the second in October. The hulls of all four ships were to be built by the Russud Shipyard and fitted out by the Naval Shipyard. Construction was slowed by the Russian Revolution and the hulls of both Admiral Nakhimov and Admiral Lazarev were seized by the Germans when they captured Nikolayev in 1918. They were later turned over the Allies in November in accordance with the Armistice. The Allies in turn handed them over to the White Russians the following year who assigned them to Wrangel's fleet. Admiral Nakhimov was run aground by the dock workers while fitting-out in Nikolayev later in 1919 to prevent her use by the Whites. She was later salvaged in 1920 by the Bolsheviks. Neither Admiral Istomin nor Admiral Kornilov were in shape to be completed after years of neglect and they were scrapped in 1922–23.

Admiral Nakhimov was renamed Chervona Ukraina, (Червона Украина – Red Ukraine) on 26 December 1922 by the Soviets and completed on 21 March 1927. She was mostly finished to the original design with some of the modifications proposed by the Naval General Staff in 1917. A pair of cranes was fitted abreast the central funnel to lift the pair of seaplanes on and off the water and the area immediately abaft that funnel was modified to stow the aircraft. Her foremast was converted from a pole to a tripod and the submerged torpedo tubes were removed and replaced by four triple 533-millimetre (21.0 in) torpedo mounts carried on her deck, two on each broadside. Chervona Ukraina was given a lengthy refit in 1939–41 where her aircraft and their handling equipment was removed and fire-control equipment was modernized. Her anti-aircraft armament was replaced by three twin Italian Minizini 100 mm (4 in) / 47 caliber gun mounts, ten single 37-millimeter (1.5 in) guns and seven 12.7-millimeter (0.50 in) anti-aircraft machine guns. One pair of her torpedo tubes was also removed.

Admiral Lazarev was renamed Krasnyi Kavkaz (Красный Кавказ – Red Caucasus) on 14 December 1926. The Soviets intended to upgrade her armament and finally settled on the new 57-caliber 180 mm (7.1 in) B-1-K gun in four single gun turrets, two at each end. Her superstructure was massively revised to accommodate these turrets and all of her original armament removed, as was her forward funnel. Her anti-aircraft armament consisted of four 30-caliber 76.2-millimeter (3 in) Lender AA guns mounted between her funnels. Like her sister, she also received four triple torpedo mounts. She was given an aircraft-handling crane, but a catapult wasn't installed aft of her rear funnel until 1935 when a Heinkel catapult was imported from Germany. She was also fitted for mine rails with a capacity of up to 120 mines.

She was refitted before Operation Barbarossa, probably about 1940, her catapult was removed, and her anti-aircraft armament was greatly increased. Her four Lender guns were exchanged for four twin 50-caliber 100 mm AA mounts and she received four single mounts for the semi-automatic 45 mm 21-K gun were fitted as well as six 12.7 mm AA machine guns. Two single mounts for 76.2 mm 34-K guns were also fitted. While under repair at Poti in late 1942 she landed her aft pair of torpedo tubes and received two more Minizini mounts salvaged from the sunken Chervona Ukraina. Ten single mounts for the naval version of the 37 mm AA gun was also fitted. By 1944 she was also carrying one quadruple Vickers .50 machine gun MK III mount on top of each of her superfiring main gun turrets and she may have been using Oerlikon 20 mm cannon.

== Service ==
The light cruiser Komintern collided with Krasnyi Kavkaz in May 1932, shortly after she was commissioned, and badly damaged her bow. It was extensively rebuilt and increased her overall length by over 11 meters (36 ft 1 in). Both ships made port visits to Turkey, Greece and Italy before World War II.

Chervona Ukraina, in company with Krasnyi Kavkaz, Komintern and a number of destroyers, laid down a defensive minefield protecting the Black Sea Fleet base at Sevastopol on 22 June 1941. They provided gunfire support to Soviet forces during the Siege of Odessa and escorted convoys bringing reinforcements into Odessa. Krasny Kavkaz transported one battalion of the 3rd Marine Regiment from Sevastopol in a successful amphibious assault behind Romanian lines to destroy Romanian coastal batteries near Fontanka and Dofinovka. Both ships escorted convoys from Odessa to Sevastopol in October when the evacuation of Odessa was ordered. During the Siege of Sevastopol, they provided gunfire support and evacuated cut-off troops from elsewhere in the Crimea into Sevastopol and brought in reinforcements from Caucasian ports. Chervona Ukraina was hit three times by bombs from German Junkers Ju 87 Stuka dive-bombers on 12 November 1941, but didn't sink until the next day after her crew was ordered to abandon her. Her guns were salvaged and most of the guns and crew were incorporated into the port's defenses,

Krasnyi Kavkaz continued to ferry reinforcements into Sevastopol. During the Kerch-Feodosiya Operation the ship sailed into the harbor of Feodosiya on 29 December 1941, landed reinforcements, and provided gunfire support for Soviet troops already ashore. In early January 1942, she was severely damaged by German dive bombers. She made it to Novorossiysk, escorted by the destroyer Sposobnyi, where she was patched up enough to make to Poti where more permanent repairs could be made. These took until October 1942 and the opportunity was taken to reinforce her anti-aircraft armament.

She was awarded the Guards title on 3 April in recognition of her performance. Between 20 and 23 October, she helped to transport 12,600 men from Poti to Tuapse to reinforce the defenses there. On the night of 4 February 1943 the Soviets made a series of amphibious landings to the west of Novorossiysk, behind German lines. Krasnyi Kavkaz provided fire support for the main landing, but the Soviet troops there were wiped out by 6 February. The loss of three destroyers attempting to interdict the German evacuation of the Taman Bridgehead on 6 October 1943 caused Stalin to forbid the deployment of large naval units without his express permission and this meant the end of the ship's active participation in the war.

=== Post-war activities ===
Chervona Ukraina was raised on 3 November 1947, repaired, and used as a training hulk until 30 October 1950 when she became a target ship. On 10 May 1952, she was grounded on a spit to serve as a fixed target. Little is known about Krasny Kavkaz's activities after the end of the war other than she was redesignated as a training ship on 13 May 1947. She was sunk as a target ship by SS-N-1 missiles on 21 November 1952.
