= Soviet cruiser Chervona Ukraina =

Soviet Admiral Nakhimov-class cruiser

Coordinates: 45.8333°N 33.15°E

- Chervona Ukraina before her 1939–1941 refit

History

Soviet Union
- Name: Chervona Ukraina
- Builder: Russud Dockyard, Nikolayev
- Laid down: 31 October 1913
- Launched: 6 November 1915
- Commissioned: 21 March 1927
- Out of service: Sunk by aircraft, 13 November 1941
- Fate: Raised November 1947; Used as a target from 30 October 1950

General characteristics (after 1939–1941 refit)
- Class & type: Admiral Nakhimov-class light cruiser
- Displacement: 8,400 t (8,300 long tons; 9,300 short tons)
- Length: 166.7 m (546 ft 11 in)
- Beam: 15.7 m (51 ft 6 in)
- Draught: 6.2 m (20 ft 4 in)
- Installed power: 14 Yarrow boilers; 55,000 shp (41,000 kW)
- Propulsion: 4 shafts, 4 geared steam turbines
- Speed: 29.5 knots (54.6 km/h; 33.9 mph)
- Range: 3,700 nmi (6,900 km; 4,300 mi) at 14 knots (26 km/h; 16 mph)
- Complement: 852
- Armament: 15 × 1 – 130 mm (5.1 in)/55 B7 Pattern 1913 guns; 3 × 2 – 100 mm (3.9 in) / 47 caliber Minizini AA guns; 4 × 1 – 45 mm (1.8 in) 21-K AA guns; 7 × 1 – 12.7 mm (0.50 in) machine guns; 2 × 3 – 457 mm (18 in) torpedo tubes; 60–100 mines
- Armour: Upper and lower armoured deck:s: 20 mm (0.79 in) each; Gun shields: 25 mm (0.98 in); Lower armour belt: 76 mm (3.0 in); Upper armour belt: 25 mm (0.98 in); Conning tower: 76 mm (3.0 in)

Chervona Ukraina (Ukrainian: "Червона Україна", lit. "Red Ukraine") was an Admiral Nakhimov-class light cruiser of the Soviet Navy assigned to the Black Sea Fleet. During World War II, she supported Soviet forces during the Sieges of Odessa and Sevastopol before being sunk at Sevastopol on 12 November 1941 by German aircraft. She was raised in 1947 and was used as a training hulk before becoming a target ship in 1950.

== Description ==
Chervona Ukraina displaced 8,400 long tons (8,500 t) at deep load. The ship had an overall length of 163.2 metres (535 ft 5 in), a beam of 15.7 metres (51 ft 6 in) and a mean draught of about 5.6 metres (18 ft 4 in). She was powered by four Curtiss-AEG steam turbines, each driving one shaft, which developed a total of 55,000 shaft horsepower (41,000 kW) and gave a maximum speed of 29.5 knots (54.6 km/h; 33.9 mph). The engines were powered by 14 Yarrow water-tube boilers. Four were coal-fired while the rest were mixed-firing. The ship carried a maximum of 540 long tons (550 t) of coal and an additional 690 long tons (700 t) of fuel oil that was sprayed on the coal to increase its burn rate in the mixed-firing boilers. At full capacity, she could steam for 1,200 nautical miles (2,200 km; 1,400 mi) at a speed of 14 knots (26 km/h; 16 mph). Chervona Ukraina was designed to carry about 630 officers and men.

The ship's main armament consisted of fifteen 55-calibre 130 mm (5.1 in) B7 Pattern 1913 guns in single mounts, six of which were mounted in casemates. Her anti-aircraft armament consisted of four 64-millimetre (2.5 in) guns. Chervona Ukraina also mounted twelve above-water 457-millimetre (18 in) torpedo tubes in triple swivelling mounts.

Chervona Ukraina's waterline belt consisted of 76 millimetres (3.0 in) of Krupp cemented armour and above it was an upper belt 25 millimetres (0.98 in) thick. The gun shields were protected by 25 millimetres (0.98 in) of armour. Each of the armoured decks was 20 millimetres (0.79 in) thick. The armour of the conning tower was 76 millimetres (3.0 in) thick.

== Service history ==
She was laid down on 3 October 1913 as Admiral Nakhimov after Pavel Nakhimov and launched on 6 November 1915. Construction was abandoned in 1917 during the October Revolution when the ship was about 80% complete. In the second half of 1918, the Marine Department of Hetman of all Ukraine Pavlo Skoropadskyi restarted construction of the ship. On 25 January 1919, the ship was formally renamed Hetman Bogdan Khmelnitsky, but Nikolayev was captured shortly afterward by French-led Allied military forces.

At the start of the Russian Civil War, the ship was run aground at the fitting dock in Nikolayev by the shipyard workers to hinder the evacuation by the Whites in 1919. The ship was raised by the Soviets in 1920 pending a decision on her disposition. The ship was renamed to Chervona Ukraina on 7 December 1922. It was decided to finish her in 1923 and the job was completed in 1927 to nearly the original design. She was modified to handle aircraft by adding cranes on either side of the middle funnel and a parking area was built for them between the central and rear funnels, although no catapult was ever fitted. The original internal torpedo tubes were replaced by four triple 457 mm (18.0 in) torpedo tubes mounted on the deck abaft the rear funnel.

Chervona Ukraina made a number of port visits to Turkey, Greece and Italy before World War II. She was extensively overhauled between 26 August 1939 and 1 May 1941 where her aircraft equipment was removed and she was fitted with new fire control equipment. The ship was given three Italian Minizini twin-gun 50 caliber 100 mm (3.9 in) anti-aircraft mounts, one was placed on the forecastle, in front of the forward 130 mm (5.1 in) B7 Pattern 1913 gun and the other two on each side of the quarterdeck. One torpedo tube mount was removed from each side and four single mounts for the semi-automatic 45 mm (1.8 in) 21-K gun were fitted as well as seven 12.7 mm (0.50 in) DShK heavy machine guns.

=== World War II ===
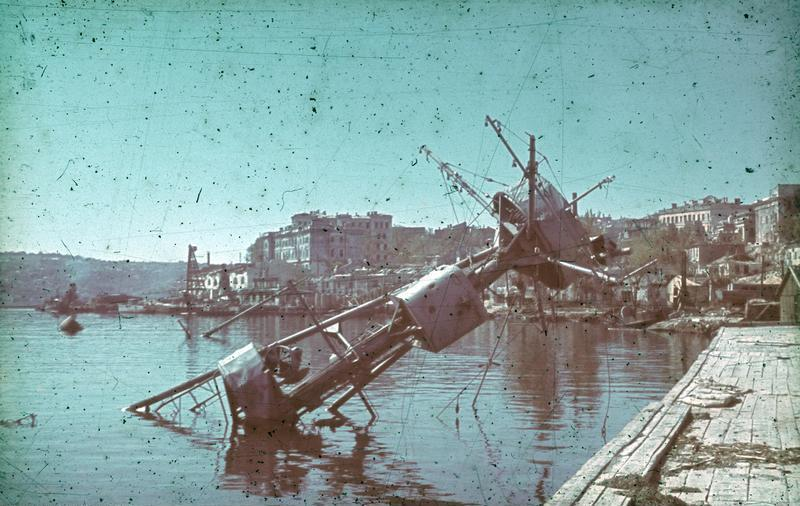
Wreck of Chervona Ukraina at Sevastopol, July 1942

Chervona Ukraina, in company with the cruisers Krasny Kavkaz, Komintern and a number of destroyers, laid down a defensive mine barrage protecting the Black Sea Fleet base at Sevastopol on 22 June 1941. She provided gunfire support to Soviet forces during the Siege of Odessa and escorted convoys bringing the 157th Rifle Division into Odessa during September 1941. She escorted convoys from Odessa to Sevastopol in October when the evacuation of Odessa was ordered. During the Siege of Sevastopol Chervona Ukraina provided gunfire support and evacuated cut-off troops from elsewhere in the Crimea into Sevastopol and brought in reinforcements from Caucasian ports. She was hit three times in the South Bay of Sevastopol by bombs from German Junkers Ju 87 Stuka dive-bombers from II./StG 77 on 12 November 1941, but didn't sink until the next day after her crew was ordered to abandon her. Her guns were salvaged and most of the guns and crew were incorporated into the port's defenses, although two of her twin Minizini turrets were added to Krasny Kavkaz.

She was raised on 3 November 1947, repaired, and used as a training hulk until 30 October 1950 when she became a target ship. On 10 May 1952, Chervona Ukraina was grounded on a spit to serve as a fixed target; by 1980 there was nothing left of the ship above the surface.

== See also ==
- Chervona Ukraina, a Slava-class cruiser commissioned in 1989 and since renamed Varyag
