= Ushakov (disambiguation) =

Ushakov is a Russian surname.

Ushakov may also refer to:

- Russian ship Admiral Ushakov, several Russian ships named after Fyodor Fyodorovich Ushakov:
  - Russian battleship Admiral Ushakov, laid down in 1892 with service in the Russo-Japanese War
  - Soviet cruiser Admiral Ushakov, a Sverdlov-class cruiser, laid down in 1950 and scrapped in 1987
  - Soviet battlecruiser Kirov, laid down in 1974 renamed Admiral Ushakov in 1992
- Ushakov Island, Arctic island named after its discoverer, Georgy Ushakov
- Ushakov Medal
