= Soviet ship Kirov =

Two ships of the Soviet Navy have been named for the Bolshevik leader Sergei Mironovich Kirov. Both have been the lead ships of their classes.

- Soviet cruiser Kirov - a Kirov-class cruiser
- Soviet battlecruiser Kirov - a Kirov-class missile cruiser subsequently named Admiral Ushakov
