= Admiral Ushakov (disambiguation) =

Admiral Ushakov was a Russian naval commander.

Admiral Ushakov may also refer to:

Entertainment

- Admiral Ushakov (film), a 1953 Soviet film

Ships

- Russian ship Admiral Ushakov, a number of ships
- MV Admiral Ushakov, a Soviet cargo liner in service 1946-75
