= Marshal Krylov-class tracking ship =

Class of space tracking ships built for the Soviet Navy

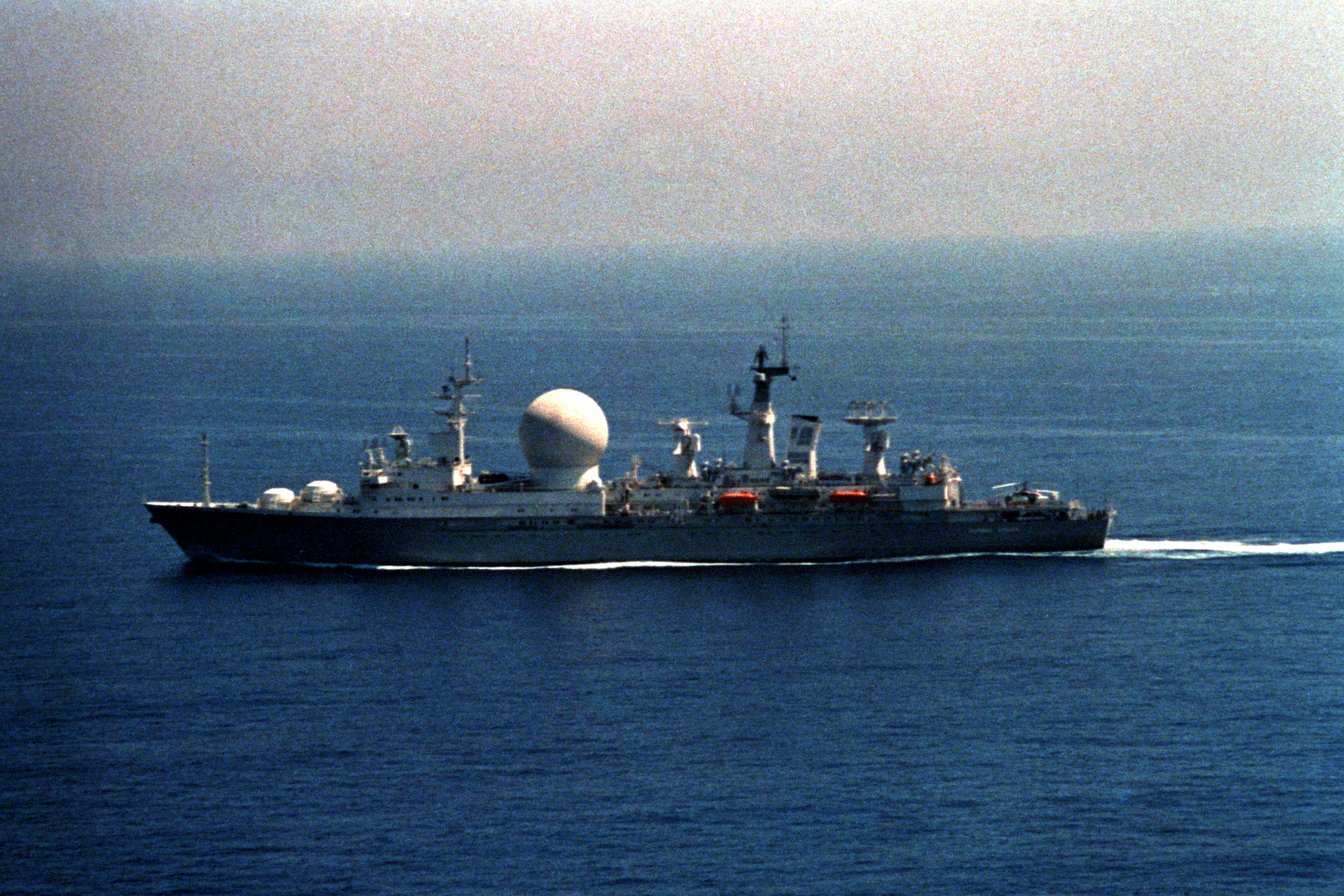
- A port beam view of the Soviet Marshal Nedelin class naval missile range ship MARSHAL KRYLOV underway.

Class overview
- Builders: Admiralty Shipyards
- Operators: Soviet Navy, Russian Navy
- Built: 1983-1989
- In commission: 1983 - present day
- Planned: 3
- Completed: 2
- Active: 1
- Retired: 1

General characteristics
- Type: space tracking ship
- Displacement: 18,360 - 22,800 tons full load
- Length: 211,2 m
- Beam: 27,7 m
- Draft: 7,99 m
- Propulsion: 2x15000 hp DGZA-6U, 2 fixed pitch propellers, 2 bow thrusters, 8x1500 kW diesel generators
- Speed: 22.7 knots
- Range: 20,000 nmi (15,5 knots)
- Complement: 396
- Sensors & processing systems: MR-320 Topaz air/surface search radar (Project 19141 - MR-755 Fregat-MA), Meteorit air search radar (not on Project 19141), 2 MR-212/201 Vaygach-U navigation radars, Volga navigation radar
- Armament: 6x6 30 mm AK-630 - MR-123 Vympel-A fire control system
- Aircraft carried: 2 Ka-27PS helicopters

The Marshal Krylov class (or Marshal Nedelin class) is a class of space tracking ships built for the Soviet Navy. The Soviet designation was Project 1914 Zodiak. Two ships were commissioned by the Russian Navy, while Marshall Nedelin was retired in the late 1990s.

== Design and role ==
The main role of the ships was the telemetry and radio-electronic tracking of the trajectories of intercontinental ballistic missiles (ICBMs) and space launch vehicles, as well as the search for and recovery of space assets landing at sea.

== Service history ==
The first ship, Marshal Nedelin entered service in 1983, while the second ship, Marshal Krylov entered service in 1989. The ships suffered the poor maintenance of the 1990s, in 1998 Marshal Nedelin was decommissioned. Marshal Krylov was overhauled between 2014 and 2018, afterwards continued its service in the Pacific Fleet.

== Ships ==
Two ships of the class:

- Marshal Nedelin (commissioned 1983, decommissioned 1998)
- Marshal Krylov (commissioned 1989)

A third ship was planned in 1990 (Marshal Biryuzov), but was cancelled.

== See also ==
- Tracking ship
- SSV-33
