= Russian ship Admiral Ushakov =

Several Russian and Soviet warships were named Admiral Ushakov (Адмирал Ушаков) in honour of Fyodor Fyodorovich Ushakov:

- Russian coast defense ship Admiral Ushakov, lead ship of her class of coastal battleships; sunk at the Battle of Tsushima in 1905
- Soviet cruiser Admiral Ushakov, a Sverdlov-class cruiser, laid down in 1950 and scrapped in 1987
- Russian battlecruiser Admiral Ushakov, formerly named Kirov, lead ship of her class of nuclear powered missile cruisers
- Russian destroyer Admiral Ushakov, formerly named Besstrashny, a Sovremenny-class destroyer, currently active in service
