= Russian battlecruiser Admiral Lazarev =

Kirov-class battlecruiser

Coordinates: 42.929623°0′0″N 132.419354°0′0″E

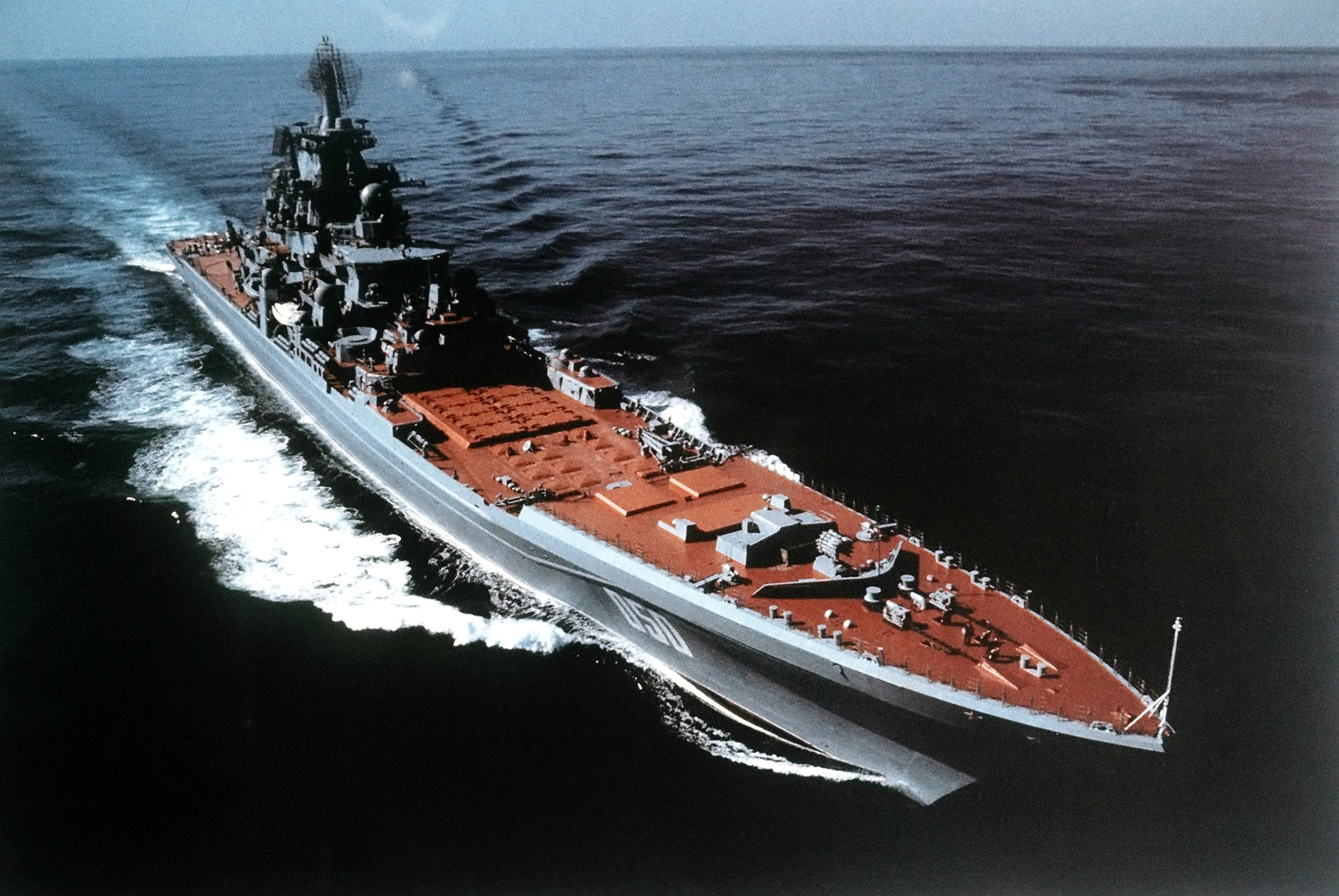
- Frunze c. 1986

History

→ Soviet Union → Russia
- Name: Frunze → Admiral Lazarev (since 1992)
- Namesake: Mikhail Frunze → Mikhail Lazarev
- Builder: Baltic Shipyard, Leningrad
- Laid down: 27 July 1978
- Launched: 26 May 1981
- Commissioned: 31 October 1984
- Out of service: 1999
- Fate: Scrapped 2021

General characteristics
- Class & type: Kirov-class battlecruiser
- Displacement: 24,300 tons (standard); 28,000 tons (full load)
- Length: 252 m (826 ft 9 in); 230 m (754 ft 7 in) (waterline)
- Beam: 28.5 m (93 ft 6 in)
- Draft: 9.1 m (29 ft 10 in)
- Propulsion: 2-shaft CONAS, nuclear propulsion with steam turbine boost; 140,000 shp (100,000 kW)
- Speed: 32 knots (59 km/h; 37 mph)
- Range: 1,000 nmi (1,900 km; 1,200 mi) at 30 knots (56 km/h; 35 mph) (combined propulsion), Essentially unlimited with nuclear power at 20 knots (37 km/h; 23 mph)
- Complement: 727; Aircrew: 18; Flag staff: 15
- Sensors & processing systems: Voskhod MR-800 (Top Pair) 3D search radar on foremast; Fregat MR-710 (Top Steer) 3D search radar on main mast; 2 × Palm Frond navigation radar on foremast; 2 × Top Dome for SA-N-6 fire control; 4 × Bass Tilt for AK-360 CIWS fire control; 2 × Eye Bowl for SA-N-4 fire control; Horse Jaw LF hull sonar; Horse Tail variable depth sonar
- Armament: 20 P-700 Granit (SS-N-19 Shipwreck) AShM; 12 × 8 (96) S-300F Fort (SA-N-6 Grumble) surface-to-air missiles; 2 х 2 (44) 4K33 Osa-MA (SA-N-4 Gecko) PD SAM; 2 × RBU-1000 ASW rocket launchers; 1 × RBU-6000 ASW rocket launchers; 1 twin AK-130 130 mm/L70 dual purpose gun; 10 533 mm ASW/ASuW torpedo tubes, Type 53 torpedo or SS-N-15 ASW missile; 8 × AK-630 six-barrel Gatling 30 mm/L60 PD guns
- Armour: 76 mm plating around reactor compartment, light splinter protection
- Aircraft carried: 3 Kamov Ka-27 or Kamov Ka-25 helicopters
- Aviation facilities: Below-deck hangar

Admiral Lazarev (Russian: Адмирал Лазарев) was the second Project 1144 Orlan (NATO reporting name Kirov-class) nuclear-powered guided missile cruiser. Until 1992 she was named Frunze (Russian: Фрунзе) after Mikhail Frunze, at that time she was renamed after the Russian admiral Mikhail Petrovich Lazarev. Scrapping of the ship began in April 2021.

== Construction and design ==
She was laid down on 27 July 1978 at Baltiysky Naval Shipyard, Leningrad, launched on 26 May 1981, and commissioned on 31 October 1984.

=== Differences from lead ship ===
Admiral Lazarev was constructed differently from the lead ship of the class. On the forward part of the ship, the twin SS-N-14 ASW missile launcher was replaced with 8 octuple SA-N-9 surface-to-air missile vertical launchers (planned, but not installed). On the aft part, a single twin AK-130 130 mm gun, similar to the guns used on Slava and Sovremennyy, was used instead of two 100 mm guns. Near the flight deck, the 30 mm CIWS cannons were moved to the aft superstructure and replaced with place for 8 octuple SA-N-9 vertical launchers (not installed). There were also some differences in the sensors, ESM/ECM suite and communication systems.

== Career ==
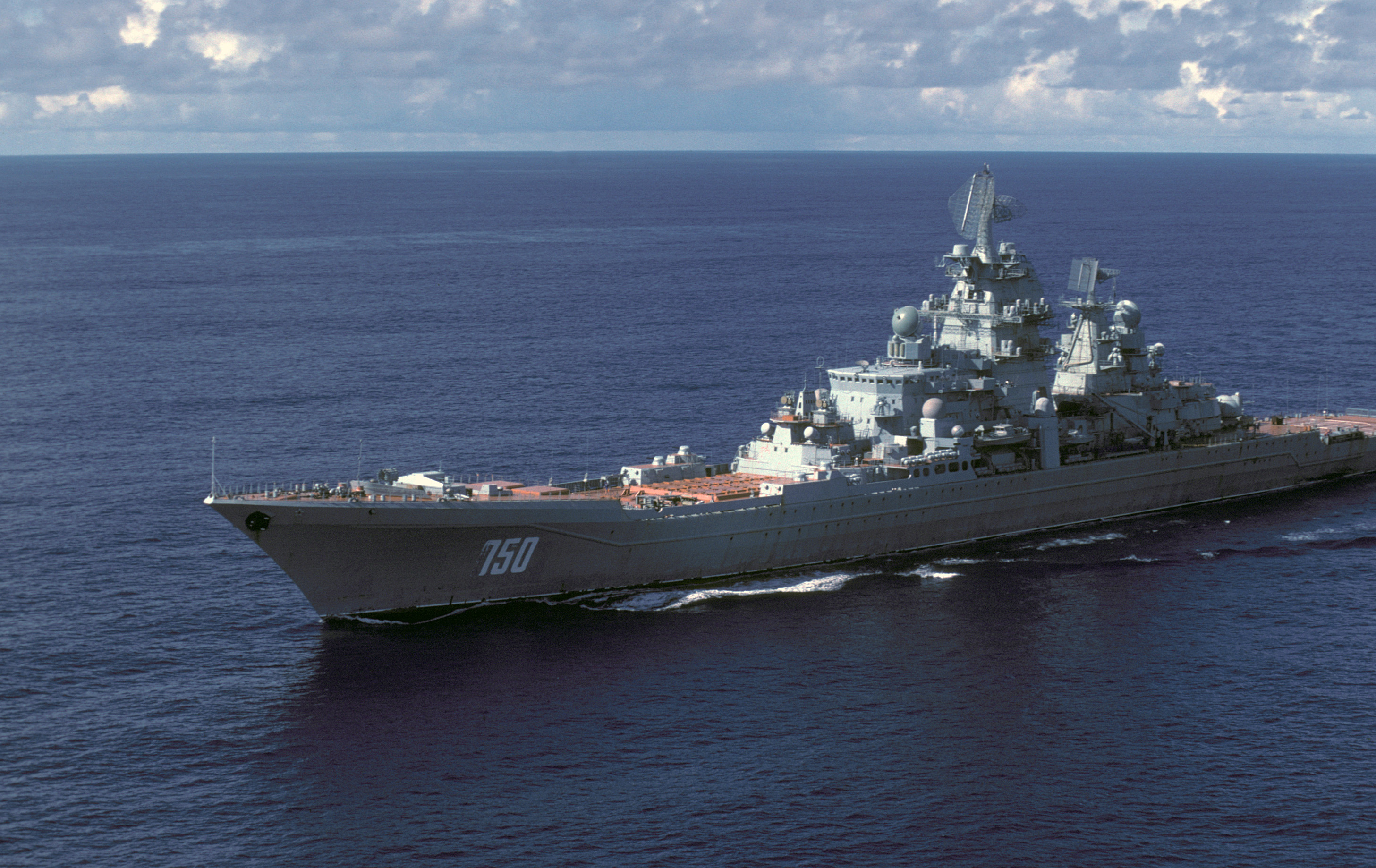
Frunze in 1985

In August to November 1985 she sailed from the North via the Cape of Good Hope and the Malacca Strait to join the Soviet Navy's Pacific Fleet. She visited Luanda, Aden, and Vietnam along the way. Holm writes that the ship only conducted local-waters training from 1987 to 1992, and was inactive from 1994 onwards.

In 1999 the cruiser was taken out of service and prepared for scrapping as no money was available for its overhaul. In 2004–2005 the cruiser's nuclear fuel was unloaded.

As of 2009 it was reported that the ship was moored near Vladivostok, in conservation status. The Russian Navy planned to modernize the ship and return it to active service, provided that the necessary funds were found. In 2012 it appeared unlikely modernization would occur, as the ship was "considered to be beyond repair... will be scrapped, a source in the military complex says".

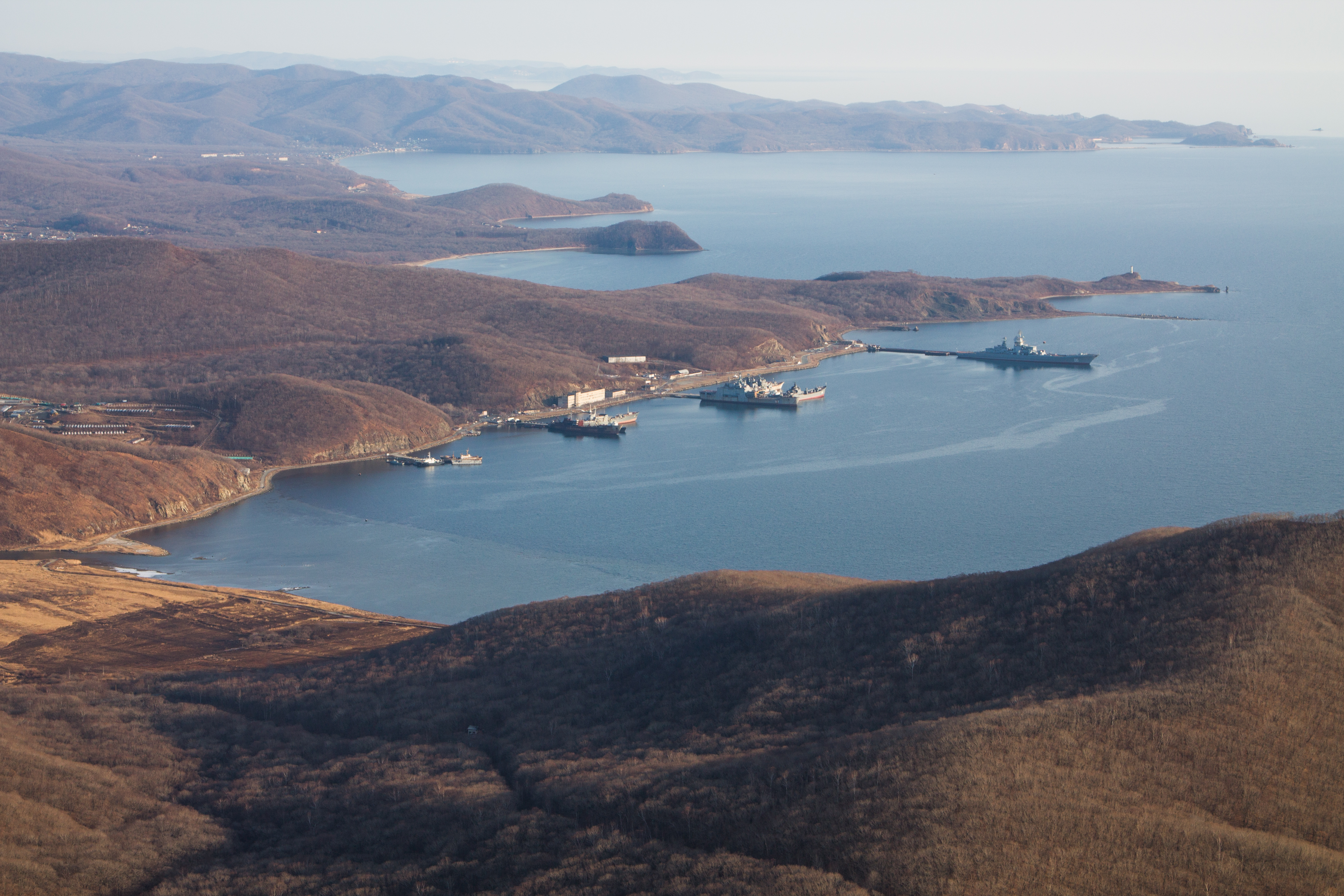
Admiral Lazarev in Abrek Bay, 2014

Admiral Lazarev has appeared in aerial imagery from 2006 to 2021 moored in the Abrek Bay mothball fleet, near Fokino, Primorsky Krai. Its berth is around 6 kilometres (3.7 mi) from the Russian nuclear-powered vessel decommissioning facility at the Chazhma Bay naval yard. In northern summer 2014, Admiral Lazarev was painted at "30 судоремонтный завод" (roughly 30th Ship Repair Factory) in the Chazhma Bay drydock to extend preservation time in the reserve fleet. The latest aerial imagery shows the ship located inside PD-41 floating dry dock at 42°53'47.0"N 132°21'34.0"E in the Chazhma Bay.

In April 2019, Russia decided to scrap and recycle Admiral Lazarev in 2021. A contract for ship recycling was signed in February 2021.

Updated scrapping photos were posted in October 2021 and October 2022.
