= Soviet communications ship SSV-33 =

Command and control ship operated by the Soviet Navy

Coordinates: 43°07′07″N 132°20′06″E

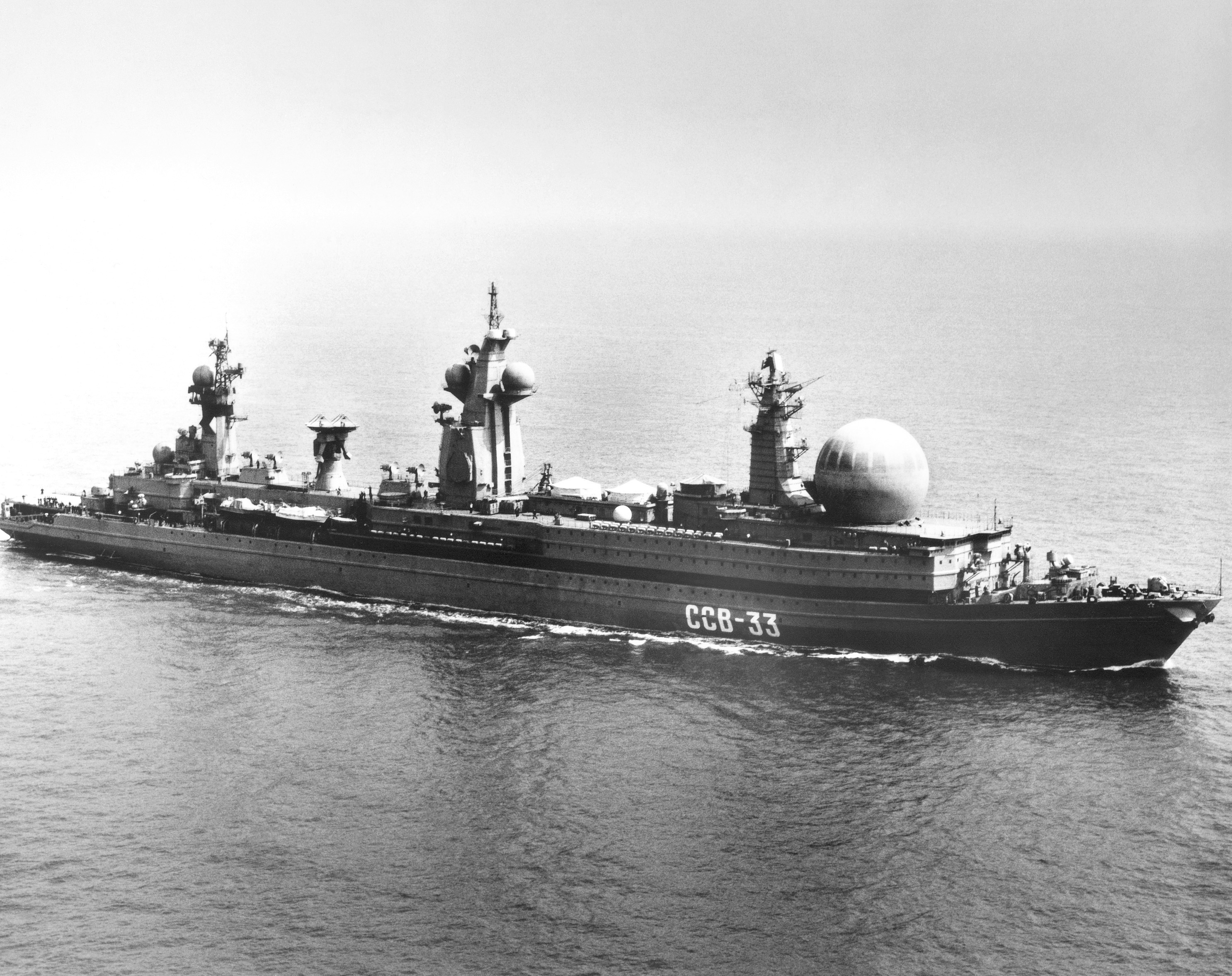
- SSV-33 Ural underway

History

Soviet Union
- Name: SSV 33 Ural
- Builder: Baltic Yard, Leningrad
- Yard number: 810
- Laid down: 25 June 1981
- Launched: May 1983
- Commissioned: 7 January 1989
- Decommissioned: 27 December 2002
- Fate: Scrapping commenced in 2010, completed by the end of 2018.

General characteristics
- Class & type: Project 1941 Titan (NATO "Kapusta")
- Displacement: 32,780 tons standard; 36,500 tons full load
- Length: 265 m (869 ft)
- Beam: 30 m (98 ft)
- Draught: 7.5 m (25 ft)
- Propulsion: 2 shaft combined nuclear and steam (CONAS), 66,500 hp (49,600 kW); 2 × KN-3 nuclear propulsion with 2 × GT3A-688 steam turbines; 140,000 shp (100,000 kW)
- Speed: 21.6 knots (40.0 km/h; 24.9 mph)
- Range: unlimited
- Complement: 950 (233 officers, 690 NCOs and enlisted men)
- Armament: 2 × 76 mm guns, 4 × 30 mm guns (AK-630), 9K38 Igla SAM missiles, 4 × 12.7 mm machine guns
- Aircraft carried: 1 × Ka-32 helicopter
- Aviation facilities: Hangar and helipad

SSV-33 Ural (ССВ-33 Урал; NATO reporting name: Kapusta, Russian for "cabbage" (Note: The reporting name "cabbage" refers to the massive dome on the forward superstructure.)) was a command and control naval ship operated by the Soviet Navy. Ural's hull was derived from that of the nuclear powered Kirov-class battlecruisers with nuclear marine propulsion. Ural served in electronic intelligence, missile tracking, space tracking, and communications relay roles. Ural was commissioned in 1989 and was laid up in early 2000s due to high operating costs.

The onboard radio reconnaissance system was called "Coral"; this involved two computer types: "Elbrus" and several "EC-1046" computers.

Ural carried only light defensive weapons. These were two AK-176 76 mm guns, four AK-630 30 mm guns, and four quadruple Igla missile mounts.

Ural was assigned to the Pacific Fleet, but there was no pier large enough for the ship. She was forced to anchor out. Machinery had to remain running while at anchor to support other systems and its crew; the ship became a floating barracks. She never went to sea, while her powerful radioelectronic equipment gradually began to decay.

The initial value of the ship's disposal contract was $310 million. The work was performed in the Bay of Bolshoy Kamen in Primorsky region and completed by late 2018.

== In popular culture ==
- In the novel World War Z, by Max Brooks, Ural is based at Ulithi as the broadcast base for the worldwide radio network, Radio Free Earth.
- A fictional duplicate, Ural II, is seen in the anime movie Evangelion: 2.0 You Can (Not) Advance, used as an external command centre for a NERV research base.

== See also ==
- List of ships of the Soviet Navy
- List of ships of Russia by project number
- Kirov-class battlecruiser
