= MV Admiral Ushakov =

History
- Name: Neidenfels (1938–45); Empire Dee (1945–46); Admiral Ushakov (1946–75)
- Owner: Deutsche Dampfschiffahrts-Gesellschaft "Hansa" (1938–40); Kriegsdienstellen (1940–45); Ministry of War Transport (1945); Ministry of Transport (1945–46); Soviet Government (1946–75)
- Operator: Deutsche Dampfschiffahrts-Gesellschaft "Hansa" (1939–40); Kriegsdienstellen (1940–45); William Thomson & Co Ltd (1945–46); Soviet Government (1946–75)
- Port of registry: (Nazi Germany) Bremen, Germany (1939–45); London, United Kingdom (1945–46); Odessa, Soviet Union (1946–72); (Soviet Union) Ilyichyovsk (1972–75)
- Builder: Deutsche Schiff- und Maschinenbau AG
- Yard number: 950
- Launched: October 1938
- Completed: January 1939
- Identification: Code Letters DOUT (1939–45); United Kingdom Official Number 180594 (1945–46); Code Letters GDNS (1945–46); Code Letters UKTB (1946–75); IMO number: 5003021 ( –1975)
- Fate: Scrapped

General characteristics
- Type: Cargo ship
- Tonnage: 7,838 GRT; 4,844 NRT; 10,540 DWT
- Length: 155.63 m (510 ft 7 in)
- Beam: 18.65 m (61 ft 2 in)
- Draught: 8.32 m (27 ft 4 in)
- Depth: 10.22 m (33 ft 6 in)
- Installed power: 7,600 hp (5.7 MW)
- Propulsion: 2 diesel engines, single screw propeller
- Speed: 16 knots (30 km/h)
- Capacity: 12 passengers (Neidenfels)
- Complement: 43 (Neidenfels)

Admiral Ushakov (Адмирал Ушаков) was a 7,838 GRT cargo liner that was built in 1939 as Neidenfels by Deutsche Schiff- und Maschinenbau AG, Bremen, Germany for Deutsche Dampfschiffahrts-Gesellschaft "Hansa", Bremen. She was seized in May 1945 by the British at Eckernförde, Germany, passed to the Ministry of War Transport (MoWT) and renamed Empire Dee. In 1946, she was transferred to the Soviet Union and renamed Admiral Ushakov. She served until 1975, when she was scrapped at Split, Yugoslavia.

== Description ==
The ship was built in 1939 by Deutsche Schiff- und Maschinenbau AG, Kiel. She was yard number 950.

The ship was 155.63 metres (510 ft 7 in) long, with a beam of 18.65 metres (61 ft 2 in). She had a depth of 10.22 metres (33 ft 6 in) and a draught of 8.32 metres (27 ft 4 in). She was assessed at 7,838 GRT, 4,844 NRT. Her DWT was 10,540.

The ship was propelled by two 6-cylinder double-acting diesel engines, producing a total of 7,600 nhp. The engines drove a single screw propeller. They were built by Maschinenfabrik Augsburg-Nürnberg, Augsburg and could propel her at 16 knots (30 km/h).

== History ==
Neidenfels was built for the Deutsche Dampfschiffahrts-Gesellschaft "Hansa", (DDG Hansa) Bremen. The third DDG Hansa ship of that name. She was launched in October 1938, completed in January 1939 and delivered on 18 March 1939. As built, the ship had accommodation for 12 passengers and 43 crew. Her port of registry was Bremen and the Code Letters DOUT were allocated. She was equipped with one 50-ton derrick, one 15-ton derrick, six 10-ton derricks, two 6-ton derricks and thirteen 5-ton derricks.

On 7 March 1940, Neidenfels was requisitioned by the Kriegsdienstellen, Bremen. In April 1940, she participated in Operation Weserübung. Neidenfels was only lightly armed, unlike her sister ships Goldenfels and Kandelfels. In August 1940, Neidenfels was designated as "Transporter A4". It was intended that she would participate in Operation Seelöwe, operating out of Antwerp, Belgium. In May 1941, she participated in Operation Blaufuchs, transporting German troops to Finland. In 1942. Neidenfels was used to transport materials to Finland. In 1945, she was delivering goods to Riga, Latvia in support of the Heeresgruppe Kurland.

On 8 May 1945, Neidenfels was seized by British Forces at Eckernförde, Germany. She was passed to the Ministry of War Transport and renamed Empire Dee. On 7 June, she was delivered to Methil, Fife. She was declared to be a prize of war. Empire Dee was placed under the management of William Thompson & Co Ltd and her port of registry was changed to London. The United Kingdom Official Number 180594 and Code Letters GDNS were allocated. Her port of registry was changed to London.

Empire Dee arrived at Suez, Egypt on 6 May 1946 for transfer to the Soviet Union. She was renamed Admiral Ushakov (Адмирал Ушаков). Her port of registry was Odessa and the Code Letters UKTB were allocated. In February 1948, Admiral Ushakov was the second Russian ship to deliver grain to the United Kingdom following the signing of a trade agreement between the United Kingdom and the Soviet Union. 9,100 long tons (9,200 t) of barley were delivered to the Alexander Dock, Liverpool, Lancashire. In May 1951, Admiral Ushakov towed a floating dock from Vladivostok to Odessa via Singapore, assisted by the tug Vasley Beslaev. With the introduction of IMO Numbers. Admiral Ushakov was allocated IMO 5003021. In 1972, her port of registry was changed to Illichivsk (in Russian Ilyichovsk, today Chornomorsk). Admiral Ushakov arrived at Split, Yugoslavia on 8 October 1975 for scrapping.
