= Russian battlecruiser Kirov =

Kirov-class battlecruiser

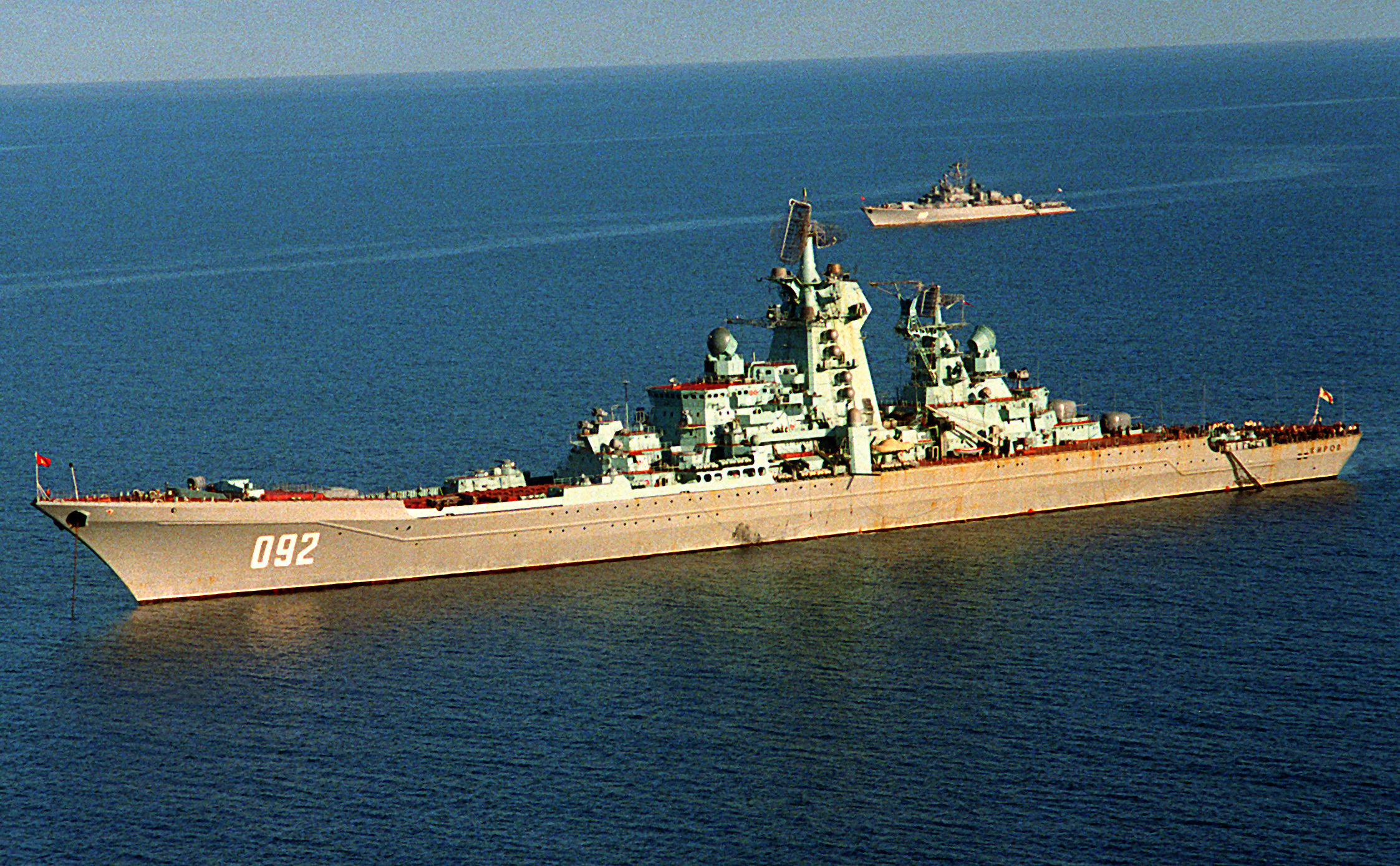
- Kirov in 1989

History

→ Soviet Union → Russia
- Name: Kirov → Admiral Ushakov (since 1992)
- Namesake: Sergei Kirov → Fyodor Ushakov
- Builder: Baltic Shipyard, Leningrad
- Laid down: 26 March 1974
- Launched: 27 December 1977
- Commissioned: 30 December 1980
- Decommissioned: 2002
- Out of service: In reserve, 1990
- Status: Laid-up, to be scrapped.

General characteristics
- Class & type: Kirov-class battlecruiser
- Displacement: 24,300 tons Standard, 28,000 (Full load)
- Length: 252 m (827 ft); 230 m (750 ft) (Waterline)
- Beam: 28.5 m (94 ft)
- Draft: 9.1 m (30 ft)
- Propulsion: 2-shaft CONAS, Nuclear propulsion with steam turbine boost; 140,000 shp
- Speed: 32 knots (59 km/h)
- Range: 1,000 nautical miles (2,000 km) at 30 knots (56 km/h) (combined propulsion), Essentially unlimited with nuclear power at 20 knots (37 km/h)
- Complement: 727; Aircrew: 18; Flag staff: 15
- Sensors & processing systems: Voskhod MR-800 (Top Pair) 3D search radar on foremast; Fregat MR-710 (Top Steer) 3D search radar on main mast; 2 × Palm Frond navigation radar on foremast; 2 × Top Dome for SA-N-6 fire control; 4 × Bass Tilt for AK-630 CIWS System fire control; 2 × Eye Bowl for SA-N-4 fire control; Horse Jaw LF hull sonar; Horse Tail VDS (Variable Depth Sonar)
- Armament: 20 P-700 Granit (SS-N-19 Shipwreck) AShM; 1 x 2 (14) SS-N-14 Silex ASW cruise missiles; 12 × 8 (96) SA-N-6 Grumble surface-to-air missiles; 2 x 2 (44) OSA-MA (SA-N-4 Gecko) PD SAM; 2 × RBU-1000 305 mm ASW rocket launchers; 1 × RBU-6000 213 mm ASW rocket launchers; 2 × AK-100 100 mm/L60 DP guns; 10 533 mm ASW/ASuW torpedo tubes, Type 53 torpedo; 8 × AK-630 hex gatling 30 mm/L60 PD guns
- Armour: 76 mm plating around reactor compartment, light splinter protection
- Aircraft carried: 3 Kamov Ka-27 "Helix" or Ka-25 "Hormone"
- Aviation facilities: Below-deck hangar

Admiral Ushakov is the lead ship of the Project 1144 Orlan (NATO reporting name Kirov class) of battlecruisers. Originally built for the Soviet Navy as Kirov and passed onto the succeeding Russian Navy, it and its three sister ships are the largest and heaviest surface combatant warships (i.e. not an aircraft carrier or amphibious assault ship) built by them. It was laid down on 26 March 1974 at the Baltic Shipyard in Leningrad, launched on 27 December 1977, and commissioned on 30 December 1980. In May 1992 all four ships of the class were renamed, and Kirov was given the name Admiral Ushakov.

Kirov entered service in the Northern Fleet in 1981 and remained in service until 1990, when it suffered a reactor accident while in the Mediterranean Sea. In 1999 there was a proposal to modernize the ship, but the plan was abandoned, and Admiral Ushakov was decommissioned in 2002.

== History ==
She was laid down on 27 March 1974, at the Baltiysky Naval Shipyard in Leningrad, launched on 26 December 1977, and commissioned on 30 December 1980, part of Soviet Northern Fleet.

When she appeared for the first time in 1981, NATO observers called her BALCOM I (Baltic Combatant I). Her first major deployment was in 1984 where she undertook a voyage to the Mediterranean Sea.

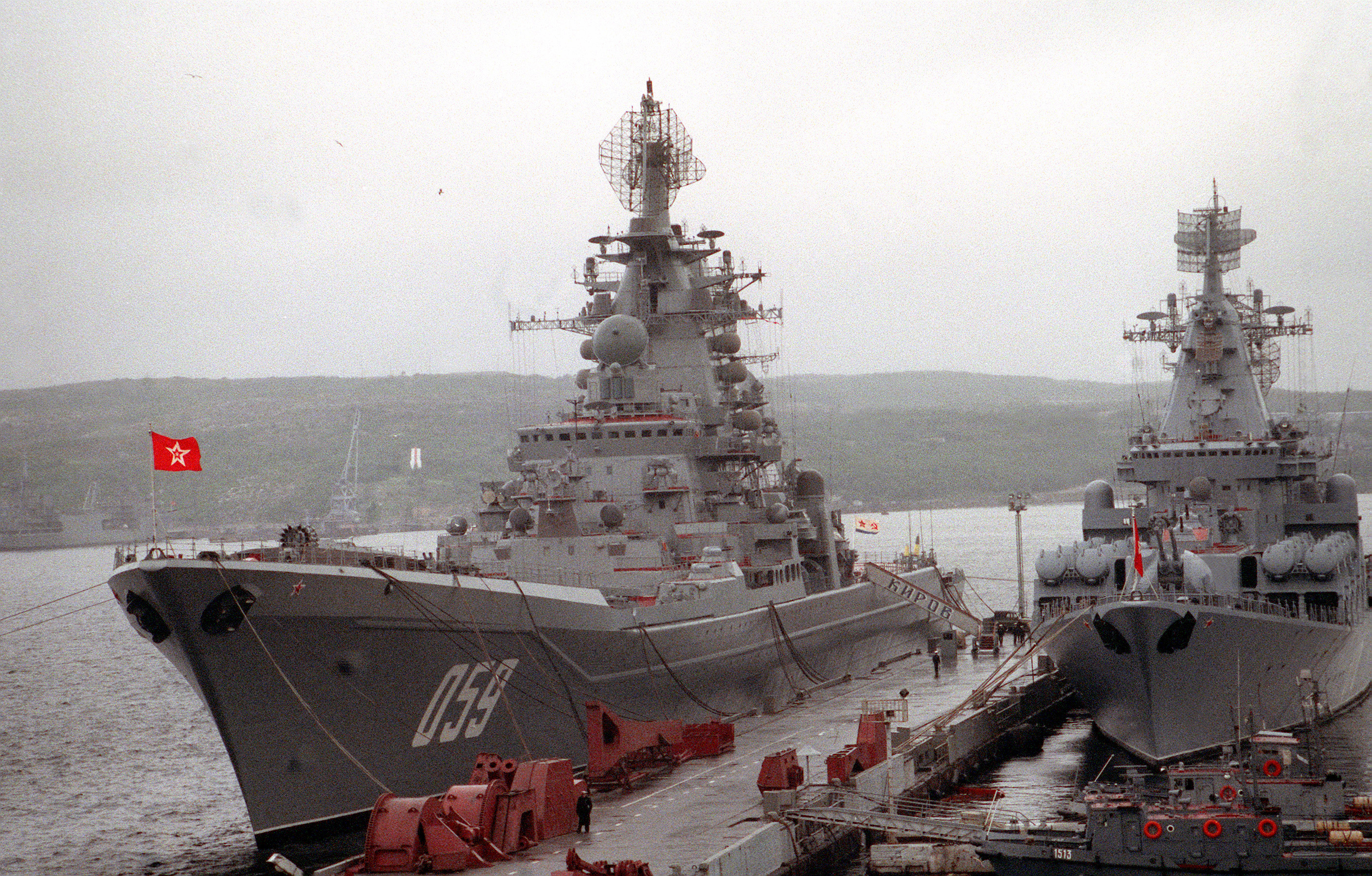
Admiral Ushakov at Severomorsk in 1992

During her second major deployment from 1 December 1989 to 17 February 1990 to the Mediterranean, she suffered a reactor accident. Afterwards, she was placed in reserve. Repairs were never carried out, due to lack of funds and the changing political situation in the Soviet Union. She may have been cannibalized as a spare-parts cache for the other ships in her class.

For political reasons, Kirov was renamed Admiral Ushakov after the 18th-century admiral Fyodor Fyodorovich Ushakov in 1992, but subsequent photos suggest that it has since reverted to its original name. An overhaul was started in 1999, but the ship was written off in 2001 and was slated to be dismantled in 2003.

In June 2004, the name Admiral Ushakov was transferred to the Sovremennyy-class destroyer Besstrashnyy. In September 2004, it was revealed that the Severodvinsk-based Design Bureau Onega had been tasked with developing the dismantlement project for the cruiser, currently moored at the Severodvinsk Zvezdochka plant. According to the Zvezdochka plant, dismantlement of the former Admiral Ushakov would cost $40 million. This plan was halted when the Russian Navy planned to bring her back to service.

In 2010, the Russian Navy again announced new plans for an overhaul of the cruiser. At the time, the plan was to modify and reactivate all of the Kirov battlecruisers by 2020. However, in 2012 it was reported that Admiral Ushakov and Admiral Lazarev would not be overhauled due to being in a state of "beyond repair". In 2015, Zvezdochka shipyard CEO Vladimir Nikitin claimed that it was dangerous to remove the spent nuclear fuel from the vessel's two reactors given the fact the ship had been given minimum maintenance for 34 years.

In April 2019, Russia decided to scrap and recycle the Admiral Ushakov in 2021. According to commercial satellite imagery, the Admiral Ushakov is still moored at 64.5802°N 39.7915°E as of July 2026.

== Armament ==
This ship had an armament of missiles and guns as well as electronics. Its largest radar antenna is mounted on its foremast and called "Top Pair" by NATO. Kirov's main weapons are 20 P-700 Granit (SS-N-19 Shipwreck) missiles mounted on deck, designed to engage large surface targets, and air defense is provided for with 12 S-300F (SA-N-6 Grumble) launchers with 96 missiles, two Osa-M (SA-N-4 Gecko) with 40 missiles and the Kashtan CIWS (CADS-N-1) air-defence missile/gun system.

Other weapons are the automatic 130 mm AK-130 gun system, 30 mm AK-630, 10 torpedo/missile tubes, Udav-1 (SS-N-14 Silex) with 40 anti-submarine missiles and the two RBU-1000 six-tube launchers.

== In popular culture ==
- In the film Threads, Kirov collides with USS Callaghan in the Persian Gulf.
- In the novel The Hunt for Red October, Kirov is deployed to the North Atlantic in pursuit of the title submarine, where it has a close encounter with American aircraft.
- In Tom Clancy's Red Storm Rising, Kirov is sunk by the Norwegian submarine Kobben.

Featured in the 66 book Kirov alt history series by author John Schettler

== See also ==
- Soviet cruiser Kirov, a Kirov-class cruiser, lead ship of a Soviet 1930–1940s class of conventional cruisers
- Admiral Ushakov (warship), for other ships named for Fyodor Fyodorovich Ushakov
