= Kirov-class battlecruiser =

Class of Russian Guided Missile Cruisers

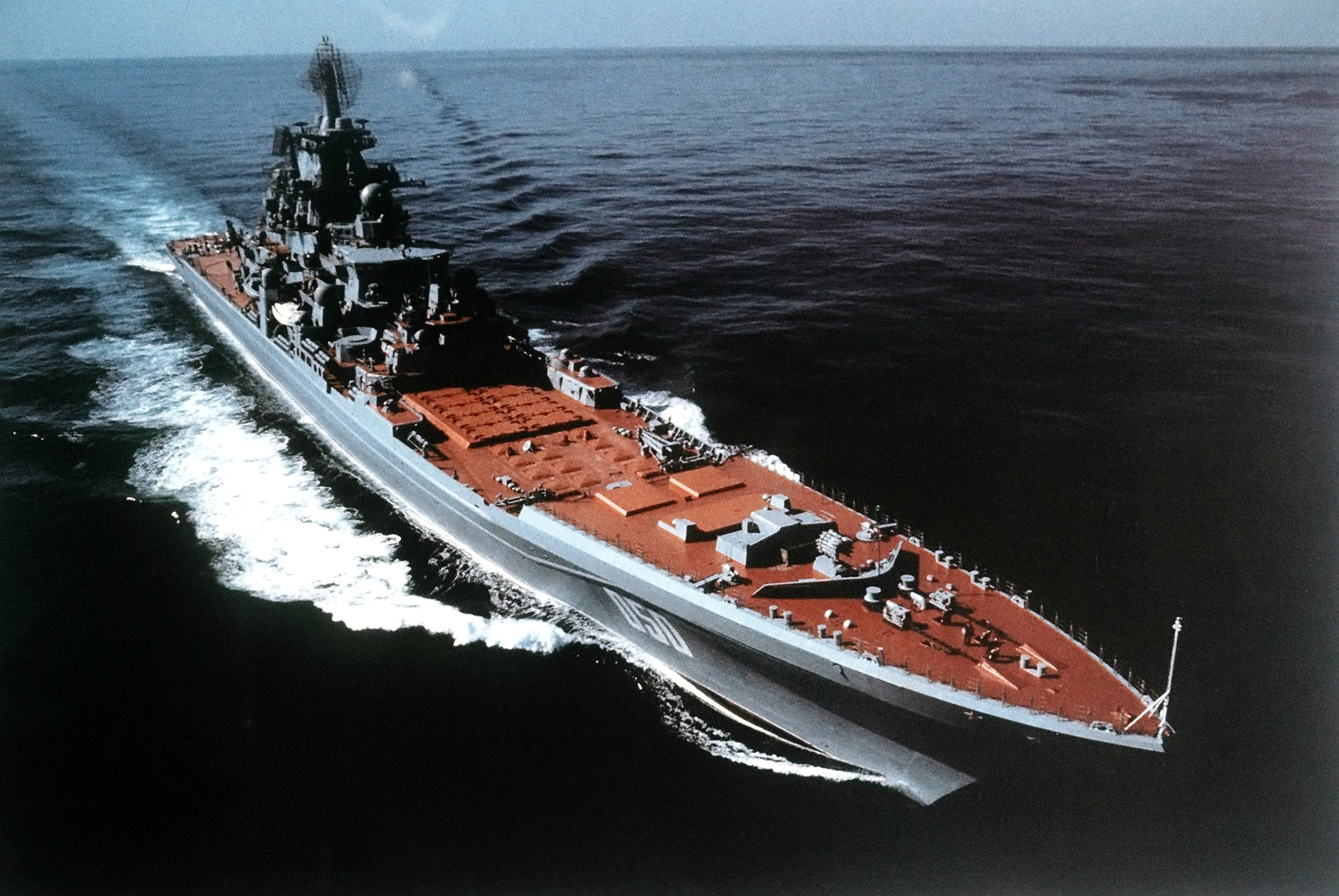
- Kirov-class battlecruiser Frunze

Class overview
- Preceded by: Kara class
- Subclasses: SSV-33 Ural
- Built: 1974–1998
- In service: 1980–present
- Planned: 5
- Completed: 4
- Canceled: 1
- Active: 1
- Laid up: 2
- Scrapped: 1

General characteristics
- Type: Heavy guided-missile cruiser/battlecruiser
- Draft: 9.1 m (30 ft)
- Propulsion: 2-shaft CONAS, 2 × KN-3 nuclear marine propulsion with 2 × GT3A-688 steam turbines; 140,000 shp (100,000 kW)
- Electronic warfare & decoys: 2 × PK-2 Decoy dispensers (400 rockets)
- Armament: Missiles: 20 × P-700 Granit (SS-N-19 Shipwreck) AShM; 96 × S-300F Fort (SA-N-6 Grumble) surface-to-air missiles (Ushakov, Lazarev, Nakhimov); 48 × S-300F Fort and 48 S-300FM Fort-M (SA-N-20 Gargoyle) long-range SAM (Pyotr Velikiy); 64 × 3K95 Kinzhal (SA-N-9 Gauntlet) Only installed on Pyotr Veiliky (8 × 8). Space reserved for 128 missiles on Admiral Lazarev, Admiral Nakhimov and Pyotr Veiliky point defense SAM; 40 × OSA-MA (SA-N-4 Gecko) PD SAM. Not on Pyotr Velikiy; Guns: 1 × twin AK-130 130 mm/L70 dual-purpose gun (2 × AK-100 100 mm/L60 DP guns in Ushakov); 8 × AK-630 six-barreled Gatling 30 mm/L60 PD guns (Ushakov, Lazarev); 6 × CADS-N-1 Kortik gun/missile system (Nakhimov, Pyotr Velikiy); Torpedoes and others: 2 × 6 RBU-1000 305 mm ASW rocket launchers; 1 × 10 (Udav-1) 254 mm ASW rocket launchers; 10 × 533 mm ASW/ASuW torpedo tubes, Type 53 torpedo or RPK-2 Vyuga (SS-N-15) ASW missile
- Armour: 76 mm plating around reactor compartment, light splinter protection
- Aircraft carried: 3 helicopters
- Aviation facilities: Below-deck hangar

The Kirov class, Soviet designation Project 1144 Orlan (Russian: Орлан, lit. 'sea eagle'), is a class of nuclear-powered guided-missile heavy cruisers of the Soviet Navy and Russian Navy, the largest and heaviest surface combatant warships (i.e. not an aircraft carrier or amphibious assault ship) in operation in the world. Among modern warships, they are second in size only to large aircraft carriers; they are similar in size to a World War I-era battleship. Defence commentators in the West often refer to these ships as battlecruisers – due to their size and general appearance. The Soviet classification of the ship-type is "heavy nuclear-powered guided-missile cruiser" (Russian: тяжёлый атомный ракетный крейсер).

The appearance of the Kirov class (first exemplar commissioned in 1979) played a key role in the recommissioning of the Iowa-class battleships by the United States Navy in the 1980s.

The Kirov class hull-design was also used for the Soviet nuclear-powered command and control ship SSV-33 Ural.

== History ==
Originally built for the Soviet Navy, the class is named after the first of a series of four ships constructed, Admiral Ushakov, named Kirov until 1992. Original plans called for construction of five ships. The fifth vessel was planned to be named Fleet Admiral of the Soviet Union Kuznetsov, also referred as Dzerzhinsky. The name was later changed to Oktyabrskaya Revolutsiya (October Revolution), and then just Kuznetsov; but on 4 October 1990, plans for construction of a fifth vessel were abandoned.

The lead ship of the class, Kirov, was laid down in March 1974 at Leningrad's Baltiysky Naval Shipyard, launched on 27 December 1977 and commissioned on 30 December 1980. When she appeared for the first time, NATO observers called her BALCOM I (Baltic Combatant I). Kirov suffered a reactor accident in 1990 during her second deployment, which was in the Mediterranean Sea. Repairs were never carried out due to lack of funds and the changing political situation in the Soviet Union, and she was placed in reserve where she was renamed Admiral Ushakov in 1992. She is presently laid up and was slated to be scrapped in 2021.

Frunze, the second vessel in the class, was commissioned in 1984. She was assigned to the Pacific Fleet. In 1992, she was renamed Admiral Lazarev. The ship became inactive in 1994 and was decommissioned four years later. On 21 February 2021, the Russian Armed Forces and the Russian State Atomic Energy Corporation Rosatom, signed a contract to dismantle and scrap the nuclear powered heavy cruiser. Admiral Lazarev set sail 30 April 2021 for 30th Shipyard. Dismantlement should be completed by 30 November 2025.

Kalinin, now Admiral Nakhimov, was the third ship to enter service, in 1988. She was also assigned to the Northern Fleet. Renamed Admiral Nakhimov in 1992, she was mothballed in 1999 and reactivated in 2005. She is undergoing overhaul and modernization at Severodvinsk Shipyard.

Construction of the fourth ship, Yuriy Andropov, encountered many delays; her construction was started in 1986 but was not commissioned until 1998. She was renamed Pyotr Veliky (after Peter the Great) in 1992. She currently serves as the flagship of Russia's Northern Fleet.

In 1983, a command and control ship, SSV-33 Ural, was launched, although the ship would not be officially commissioned until 1989. She utilized the basic hull design of the Kirov-class vessels, but with a modified superstructure, different armament, and was intended for a different role within the Soviet Navy. Ural was decommissioned and laid up in 2001, due to high operating costs, and scrapped starting in 2010.

On 23 March 2004, English language press reported the Russian Navy Commander-in-Chief, Fleet Admiral Vladimir Kuroedov said Pyotr Veliky's reactor was in an extremely bad condition and could explode "at any moment", a statement which may have been the result of internal politics within the Russian Navy. The ship was sent to port for a month, and the crew lost one-third of their pay.

Russia initially planned to reactivate Admiral Ushakov and Admiral Lazarev by 2020, but it was later indicated that the condition of the reactor cores of both ships was such that it would prove difficult, expensive and potentially dangerous to remove the spent nuclear fuel and repair the cores. As a consequence, both ships were earmarked for scrapping in 2021. The scrapping of Admiral Lazarev began in early 2021.

As of early 2022, only Pyotr Velikiy was operational. Modernization of Admiral Nakhimov is ongoing and was reported, in 2021, to continue until "at least" 2023, with the modernization of Pyotr Velikiy to immediately follow and last for about three years. However, in early 2022, Sevmash CEO Mikhail Budnichenko stated that the ship would be delivered to the Russian Navy in 2022. This deadline would also be missed, and Sevmash later clarified that they expected to return the ship to service in 2024.

The modernization of Admiral Nakhimov and her sister ship is to be extensive, with Admiral Nakhimov expected to receive 174 Vertical-launch (VLS) tubes: 80 for anti-surface and 94 for anti-air warfare, among other upgrades. In early 2022, the Sevmash CEO noted that weapons systems for Admiral Nakhimov would include: the Fort-M (NATO reporting name: SA-N-6 Grumble) and Pantsyr-M (SA-22 Greyhound) air defense systems and Paket-NK and Otvet antisubmarine warfare weapons. It was also reported that the cruiser would potentially be armed with up to 60 3M22 Zircon hypersonic anti-ship missiles.

== Design ==
The class was originally conceived to counter the U.S. Navy's submarines with its large payload of SS-N-14 anti-submarine missiles, and later evolved to carry twenty P-700 Granit anti-ship missiles for countering the U.S. carrier strike groups. Ultimately the class were intended to operate alongside new nuclear-powered aircraft carriers for global power projection, however these carriers never came to fruition.

=== Weapon systems ===
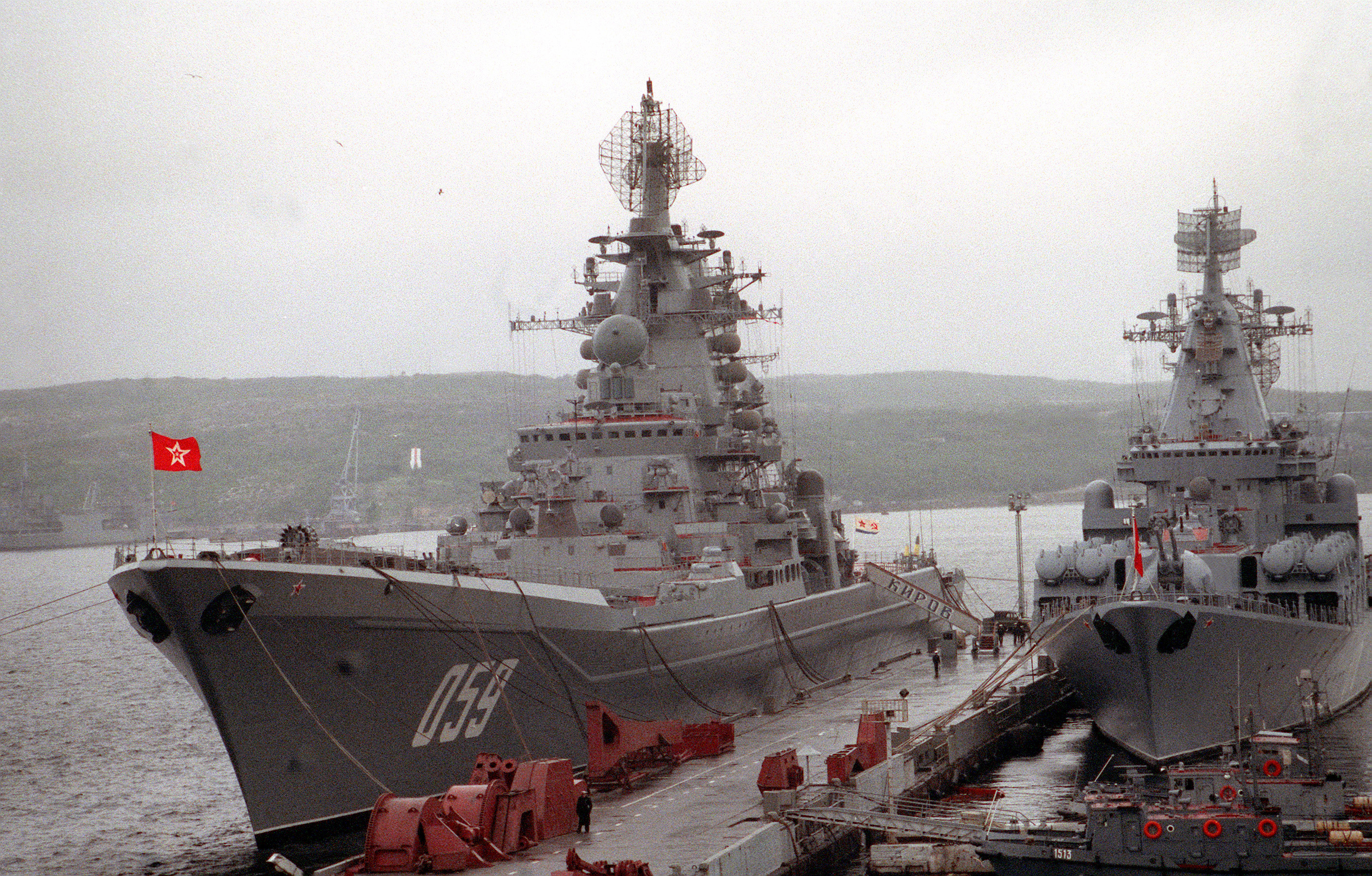
Admiral Ushakov (ex-Kirov), lead ship of the class, next to the Slava-class cruiser Marshal Ustinov

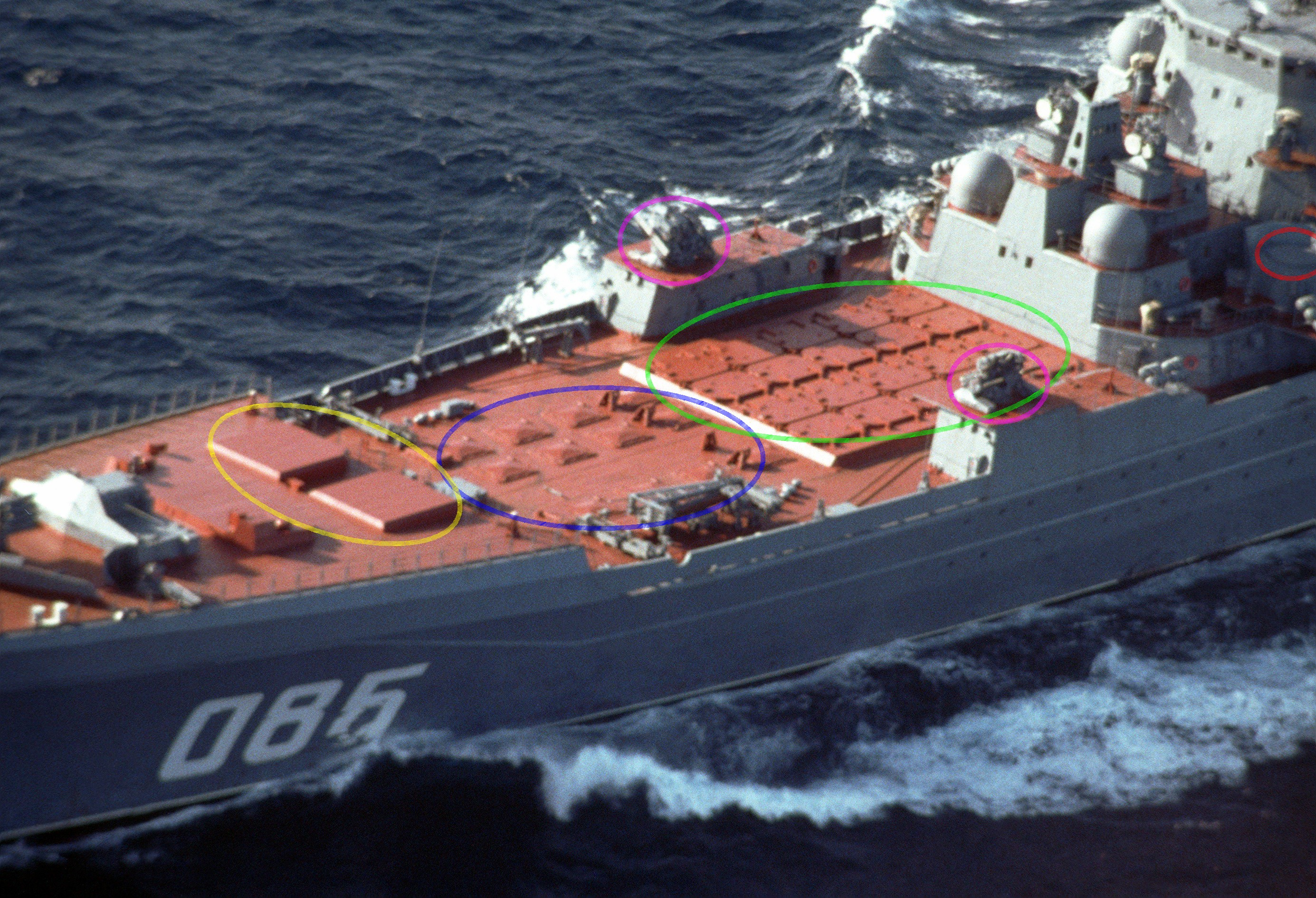
Aerial port view of the foredeck of Kalinin illustrating the differences from the lead ship of the class. 2 Kortik point defense gun/missile system Empty space intended for 2 Kinzhal vertical SAM launchers

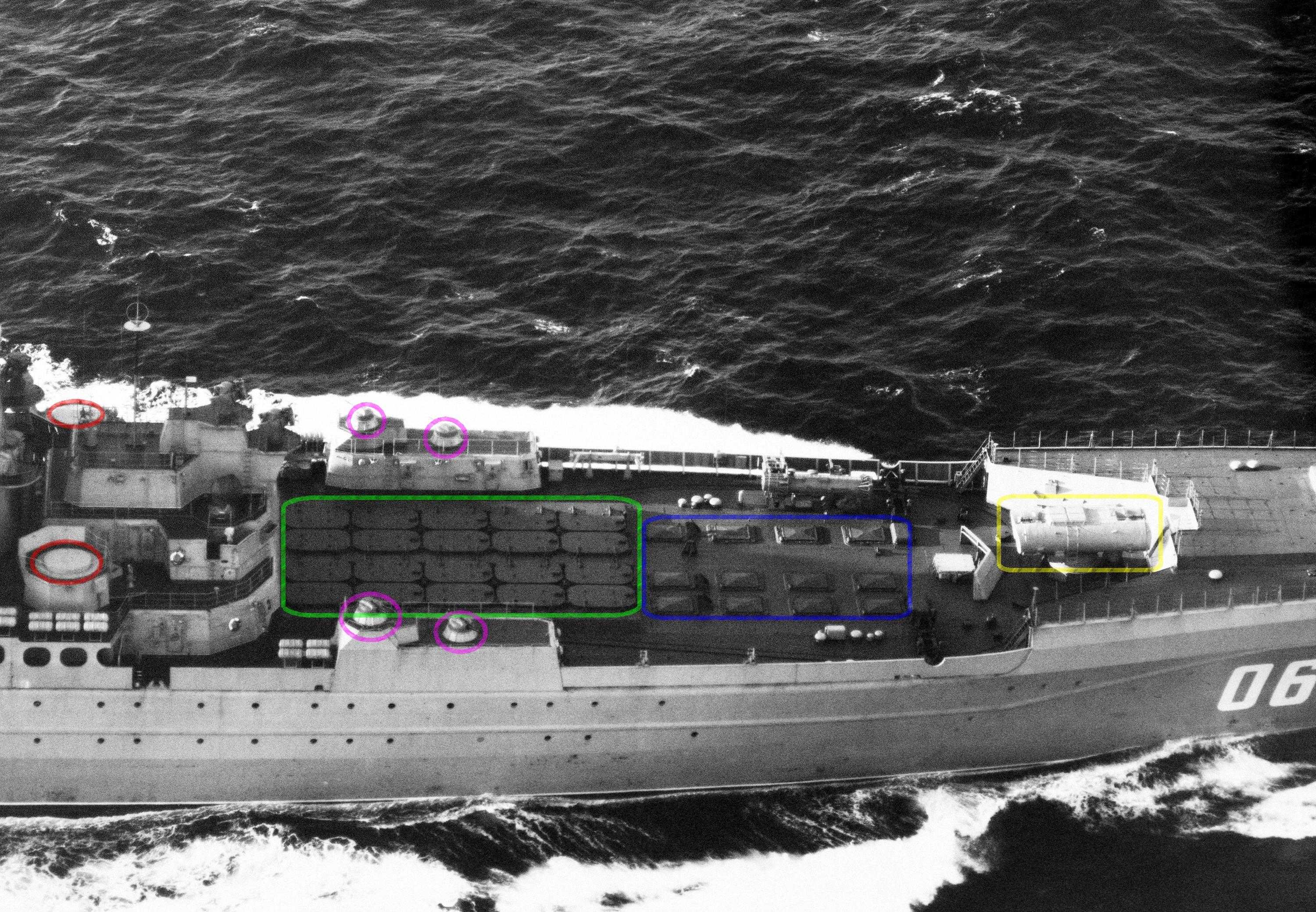
Aerial starboard view of the foredeck of Kirov. 4 30mm AK-630 CIWS 2 pop-up (lowered) Osa SAM launchers 20 P-700 Granit cruise missile launchers 12 S-300 Fort SAM launchers 1 twin "Metel" antisubmarine warfare/surface-to-surface missile launcher

The Kirov class's main weapons are 20 P-700 Granit (SS-N-19 Shipwreck) missiles mounted in deck, designed to engage large surface targets. Air defense is provided by twelve octuple S-300F launchers with 96 missiles and a pair of Osa-MA batteries with 20 missiles each. Pyotr Velikiy carries some S-300FM missiles and is the only ship in the Russian Navy capable of ballistic missile defence. The ships had some differences in sensor and weapons suites: Kirov came with Metel anti-submarine warfare (ASW) missiles, while on subsequent ships these were replaced with 3K95 Kinzhal (Russian: Кинжал – dagger) surface-to-air missile (SAM) systems. The Kinzhal installation is in fact mounted further forward of the old SS-N-14 mounting, in the structure directly behind the blast shield for the bow mounted RBU ASW rocket launcher. Kirov and Frunze had eight 30 mm (1.18 in) AK-630 close-in weapon systems, which were supplanted with the Kortik air-defence system on later ships.

Other weapons are the automatic 130 mm (5 in) AK-130 gun system (except in Kirov which had two single 100 mm (4 in) guns instead), 10 21-inch (533 mm) torpedo/missile tubes (capable of firing RPK-2 Vyuga ASW missiles on later ships) and Udav-1 with 40 anti-submarine rockets and two sextuple RBU-1000 launchers.

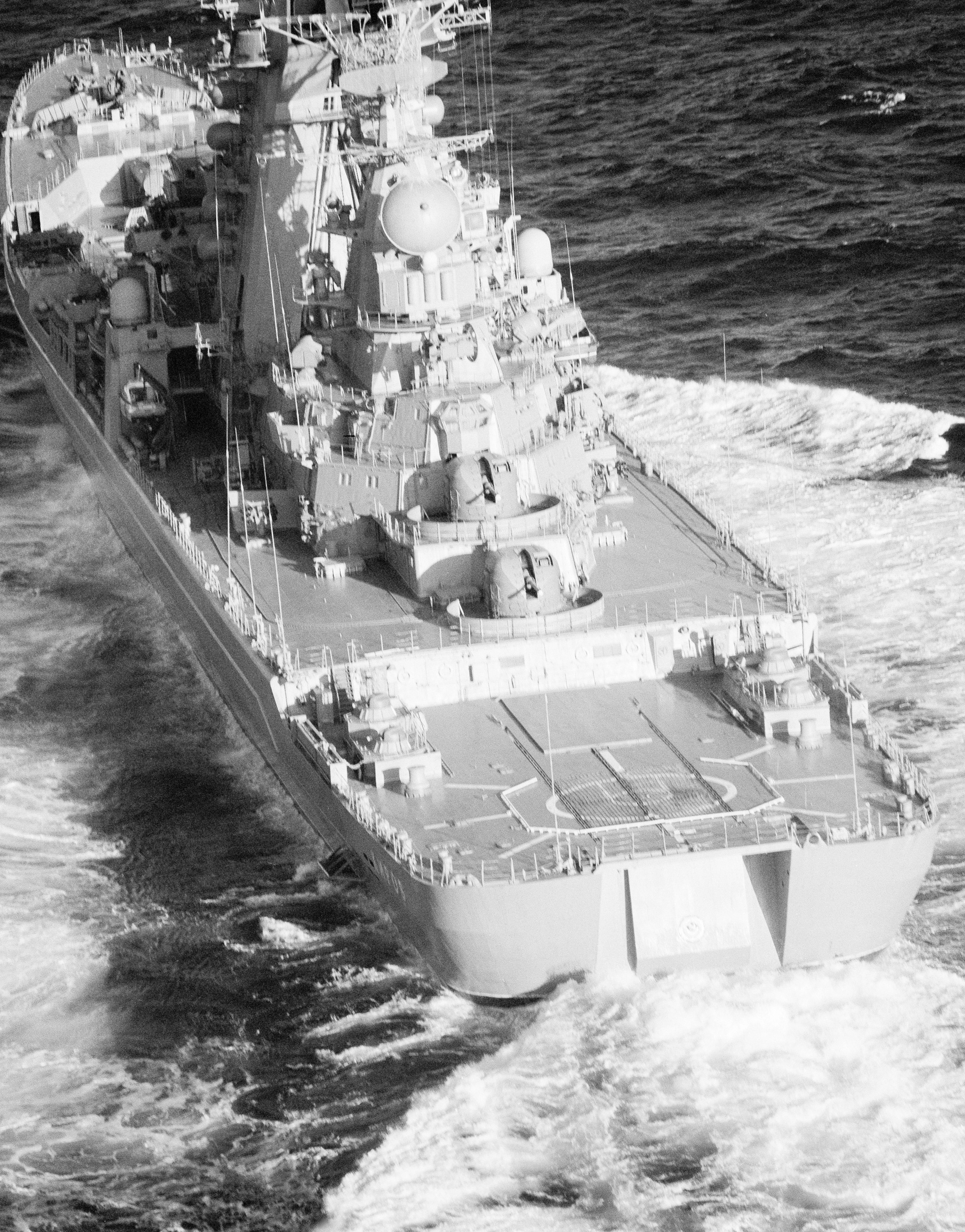
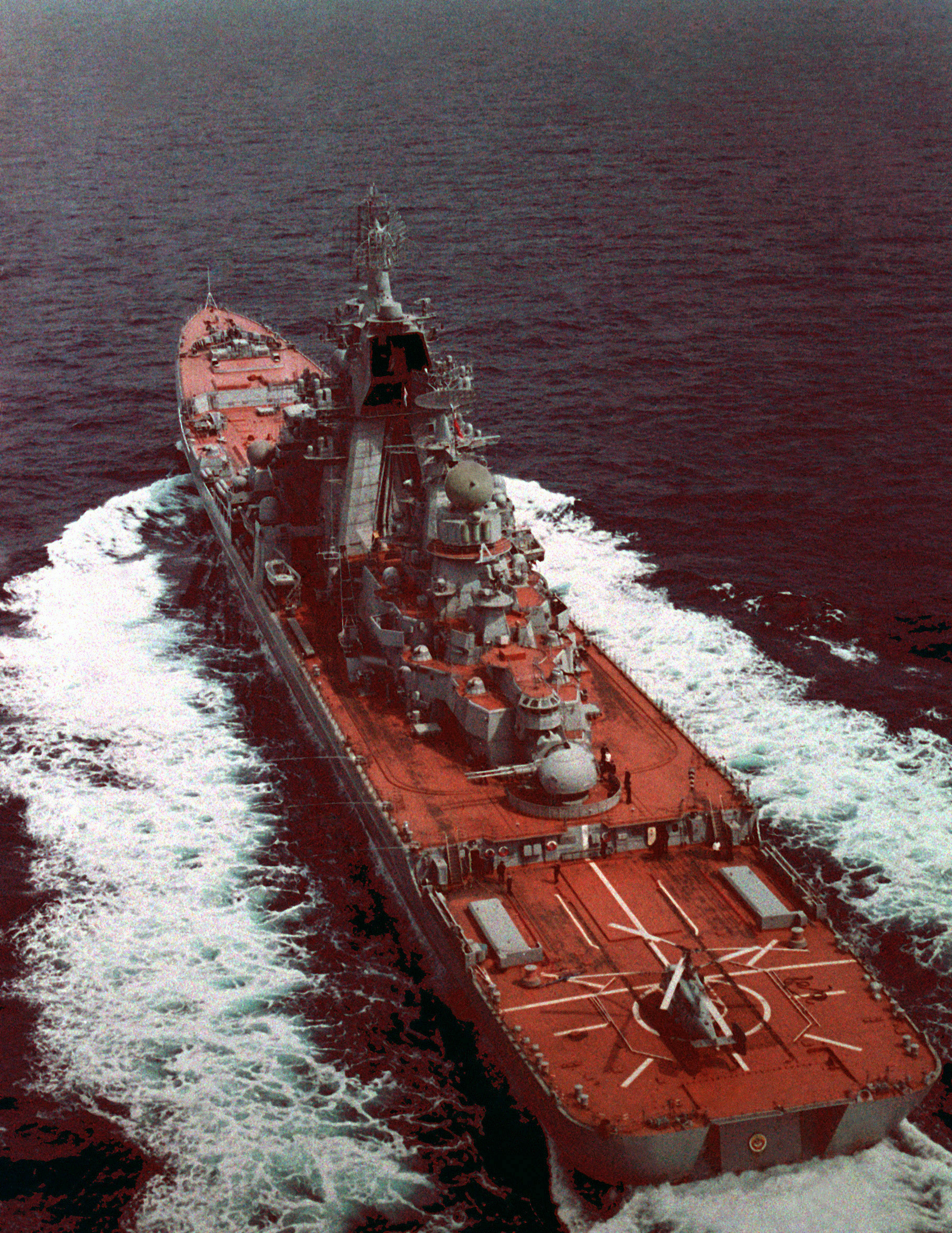
The aft sections of Kirov (left) and Frunze (right) showing differences in weapons fit – Kirov has a pair of single 100 mm guns, and two pairs of AK-630 CIWS mounts either side of the flight deck, whereas Frunze has a twin 130 mm turret and eight 3K95 "Kinzhal" VLS in place of the CIWS mounts.

Russia has developed a new anti-ship missile called the 3M22 Tsirkon, which is capable of traveling at hypersonic speeds out to at least 620 mi (540 nmi; 1,000 km), which is reportedly installed on the modernized Kirov-class ship Admiral Nakhimov, among other new missiles like the 3M54/14 Kalibr and P-800 Oniks, which, along with the Zircon are equipped via a new vertical launch system called the 3S14, and the S-400 Triumf, a new Russian medium and long-range anti-air missile .

=== Armaments ===
Armament fit of Kirov class
	Kirov / Admiral Ushakov	Frunze / Admiral Lazarev	Kalinin / Admiral Nakhimov	Yuri Andropov / Pyotr Velikiy
Anti-ship missiles	20 × P-700 Granit (SS-N-19 'Shipwreck')			
Anti-submarine missiles	1 × twin MS-82 launcher for Metel (SS-N-14 'Silex') complex, 10 85R missiles			
Anti-submarine missiles	RPK-2 Vyuga (SS-N-15 'Starfish') launched via 533 mm torpedo tube			
Surface-to-air missiles	12 × 8 S-300F (SA-N-6 'Grumble')			6 × 8 S-300F (SA-N-6 'Grumble')
Surface-to-air missiles	2 × 20 9K33 Osa (SA-N-4 'Gecko')			6 × 8 S-300FM (SA-N-20 'Gargoyle')
Surface-to-air missiles		Space reserved for 16 × 8 3K95 Kinzhal (SA-N-9 'Gauntlet')		8 × 8 3K95 Kinzhal (SA-N-9 'Gauntlet')
Guns	2 × 1 AK-100 100 mm (2000 rounds)	1 × 2 AK-130 130 mm		
Close-in weapon systems	8 × AK-630M (48000 rounds)		6 × CADS-N-1 (8 missiles each)	
Anti-submarine rockets	2 × RBU-1000, 1 × RBU-12000			
Torpedo tubes	10 × 533mm torpedo tubes for Type 53			

=== Fire control ===
- 2 × Top Dome for S-300F fire control radar (the forward Top Dome is replaced with Tomb Stone (Passive electronically scanned array) in Pyotr Veliky)
- 4 × Bass Tilt for AK-630 CIWS System fire control (not in Admiral Nakhimov or Pyotr Veliky)
- 2 × Eye Bowl for OSA-M fire control (also for SS-N-14 in Admiral Ushakov)
- 2 × Hot Flash/Hot Spot for Kortik (CADS-N-1 units only)
- 1 × Kite Screech for AK-100 or AK-130
- 2 × Cross Sword for Kinzhal (Kinzhal-equipped units only)

=== Propulsion ===
The Kirov battlecruisers use nuclear propulsion with two conventional boilers installed as a backup in case of reactor failure, known as "COmbined Nuclear And Steam propulsion system" (CONAS). These drive two geared steam turbines, generating 120,000 hp (89 MW), at two prop shafts.

== Ships ==
Construction data
Name	First namesake	Second namesake	Builder	Laid down	Launched	Commissioned	Status
Admiral Ushakov (ex-Kirov)	Sergei Kirov	Fyodor Ushakov	Baltiysky Zavod, Leningrad	27 March 1974	26 December 1977	30 December 1980	Laid up, to be scrapped
Admiral Lazarev (ex-Frunze)	Mikhail Frunze	Mikhail Lazarev	Baltiysky Zavod, Leningrad	27 July 1978	26 May 1981	31 October 1984	Scrapped in April 2021
Admiral Nakhimov (ex-Kalinin)	Mikhail Kalinin	Pavel Nakhimov	Baltiysky Zavod, Leningrad	17 May 1983	25 April 1986	30 December 1988	Mothballed in 1999. Modernisation started in 2015. Was due to return to service in 2024, but this has been pushed back to "sometime in 2025." Admiral Nakhimov started new sea trials in August 2025.
Pyotr Velikiy (ex-Yuriy Andropov)	Yuri Andropov	Peter the Great	Baltiysky Zavod, Leningrad	11 March 1986	29 April 1989	9 April 1998	Laid up
Admiral Flota Sovetskogo; Soyuza Kuznetsov (ex-Dzerzhinsky, ex-Oktyabrskaya Revolutsiya)	Felix Dzerzhinsky, October Revolution	Nikolay Gerasimovich Kuznetsov	Cancelled, 4 October 1990				

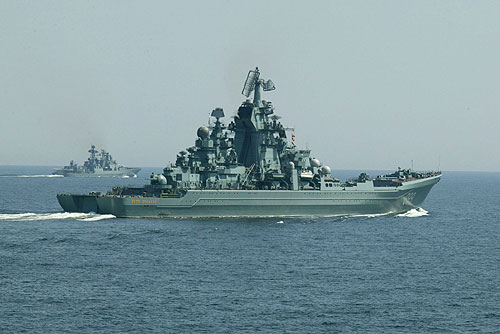
The Russian flagship Pyotr Veliky

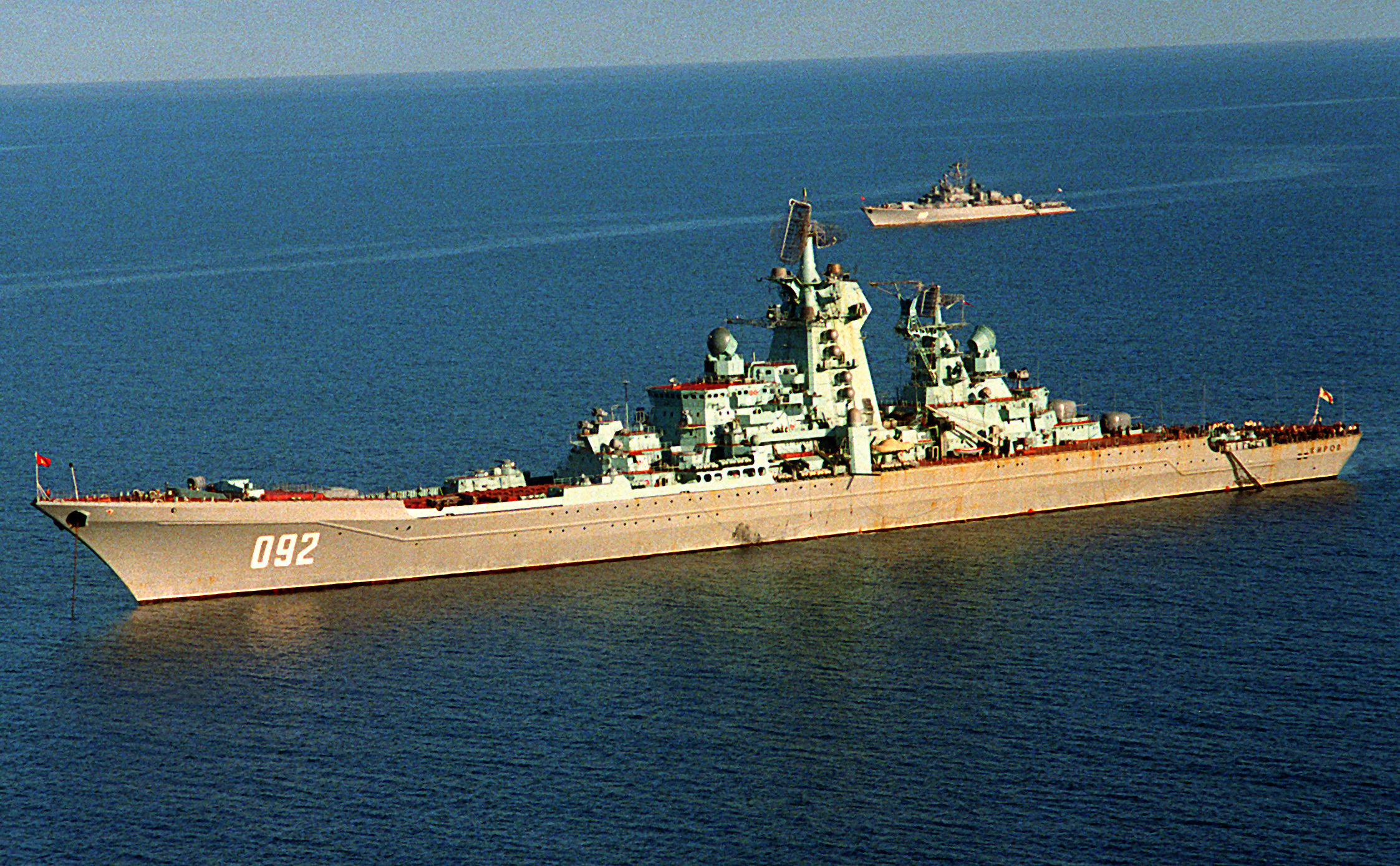
Kirov at anchor

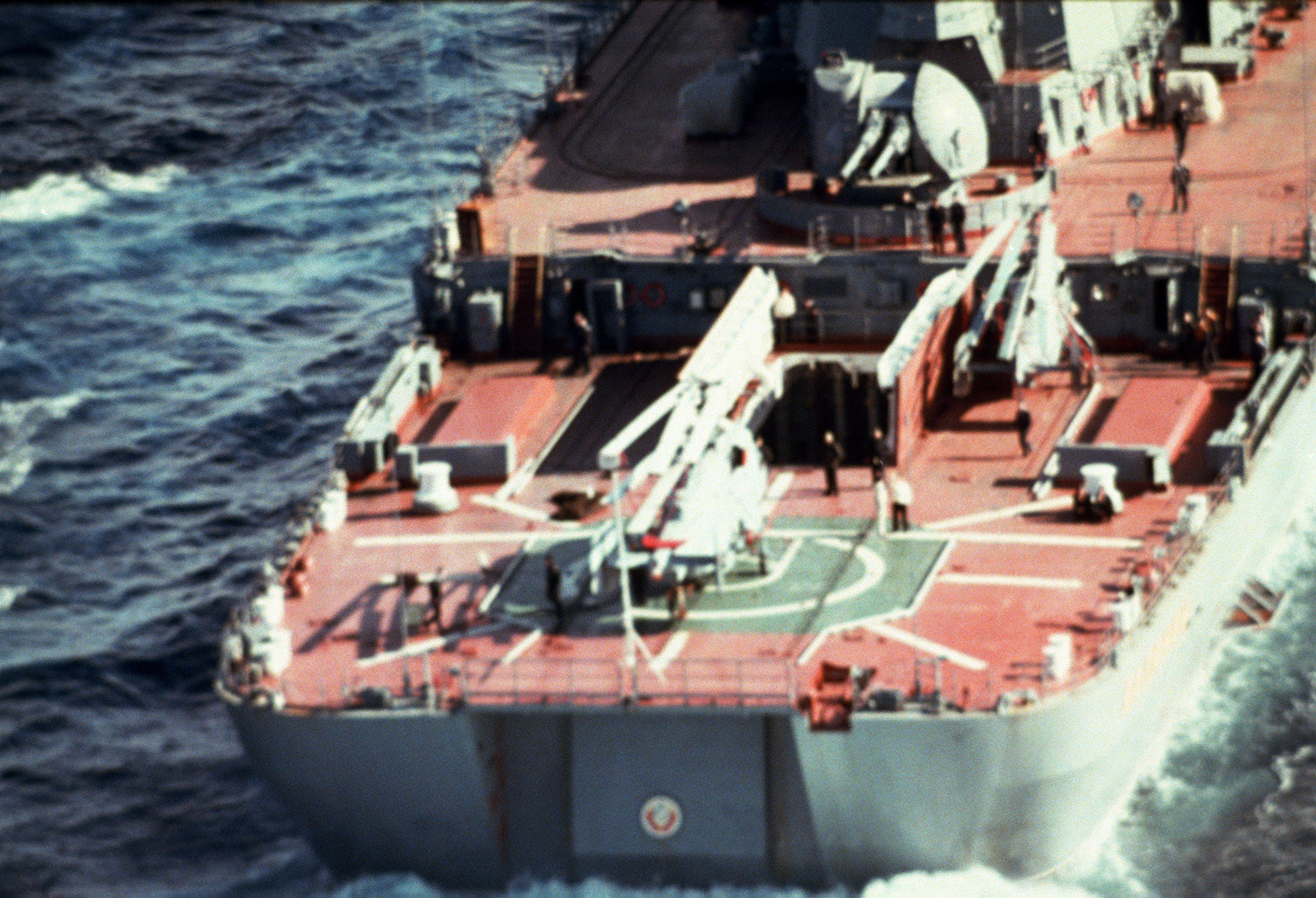
The flight deck of Kalinin showing the hangar doors open and a Kamov Ka-25 and a Kamov Ka-27 helicopter

== In popular culture ==
A fictional Kirov-class ship "Vyerni" appears in the TNT and now Netflix TV show The Last Ship (2014), where it is the vessel of one of Season 1's main antagonists, Nikolay Ruskov.

== See also ==
- List of naval ship classes in service
- List of active Russian Navy ships
- List of ships of Russia by project number
- List of ships of the Soviet Navy
- Kirov-class cruiser
