= Soviet cruiser Admiral Ushakov =

Soviet Sverdlov-class cruiser

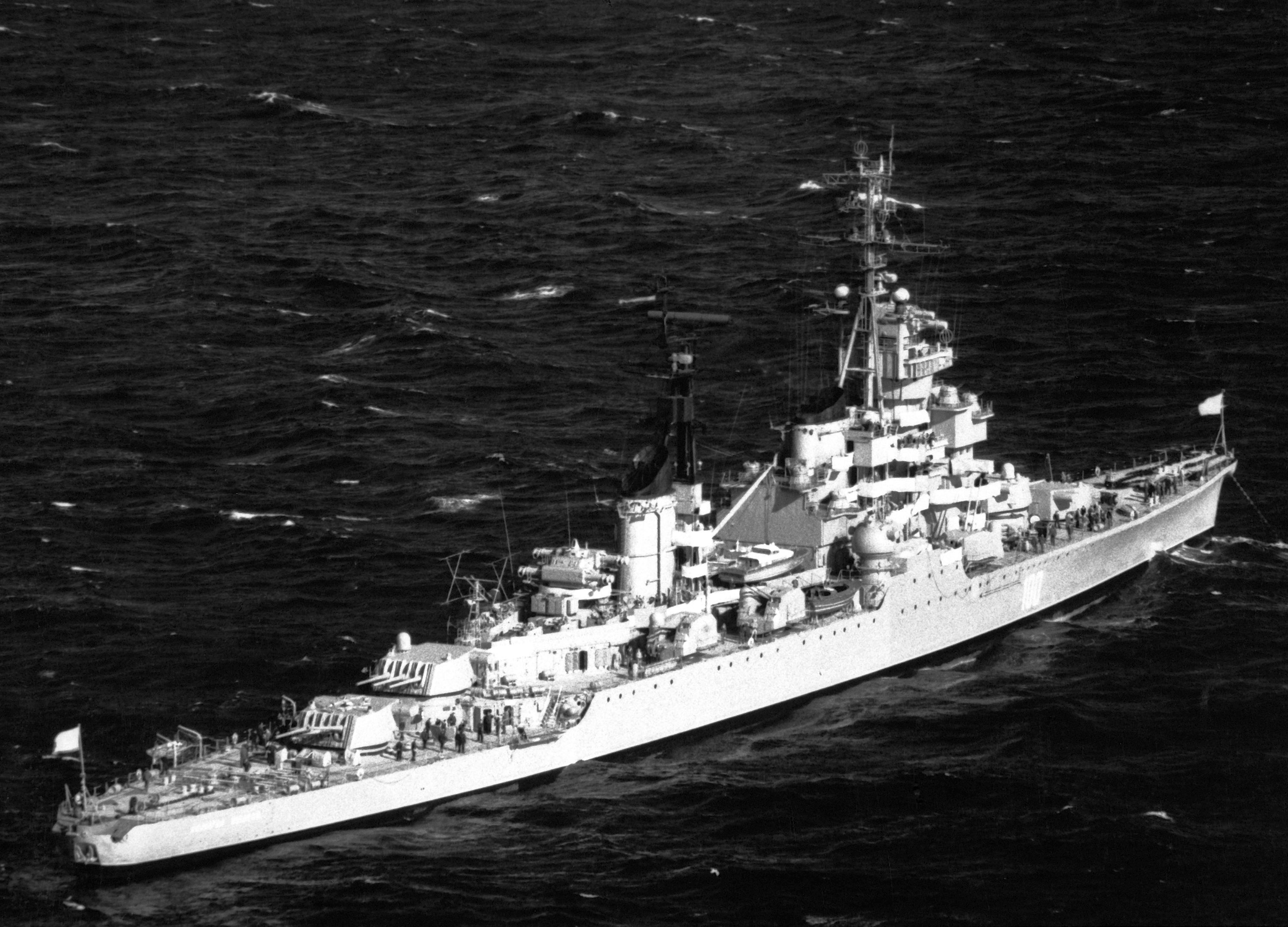
- Admiral Ushakov underway on 3 November 1981

History

Soviet Union
- Name: Admiral Ushakov; (Адмирал Ушаков)
- Namesake: Fyodor Ushakov
- Ordered: 31 August 1950
- Builder: Baltic Shipyard, Leningrad
- Yard number: 420
- Laid down: 29 September 1951
- Launched: 31 August 1950
- Commissioned: 18 August 1952
- Decommissioned: 28 February 1983
- Stricken: 16 September 1987
- Identification: See Pennant numbers
- Fate: Scrapped, 1992

General characteristics
- Class & type: Sverdlov-class cruiser
- Displacement: 13,600 tonnes (13,385 long tons) standard; 16,640 tonnes (16,377 long tons) full load
- Length: 210 m (689 ft 0 in) overall; 205 m (672 ft 7 in) waterline
- Beam: 22 m (72 ft 2 in)
- Draught: 6.9 m (22 ft 8 in)
- Propulsion: 2 × shaft geared steam turbines; 6 × boilers, 110,000 hp (82,000 kW)
- Speed: 32.5 knots (60.2 km/h; 37.4 mph)
- Range: 9,000 nmi (17,000 km; 10,000 mi) at 18 knots (33 km/h; 21 mph)
- Complement: 1,250
- Armament: 4 × triple 15.2 cm (6.0 in)/57 cal B-38 guns in Mk5-bis turrets; 6 × twin 10 cm (3.9 in)/56 cal Model 1934 guns in SM-5-1 mounts; 16 × twin 3.7 cm (1.5 in) AA guns in V-11M mounts; 2 × quintuple 533 mm (21.0 in) torpedo tubes in PTA-53-68-bis mounts
- Armour: Belt: 100 mm (3.9 in); Conning tower: 150 mm (5.9 in); Deck: 50 mm (2.0 in); Turrets: 175 mm (6.9 in) front, 65 mm (2.6 in) sides, 60 mm (2.4 in) rear, 75 mm (3.0 in) roof; Barbettes: 130 mm (5.1 in); Bulkheads: 100–120 mm (3.9–4.7 in)

Admiral Ushakov was a Sverdlov-class cruiser of the Soviet Navy.

== Development and design ==
The Sverdlov-class cruisers, Soviet designation Project 68bis, were the last conventional gun cruisers built for the Soviet Navy. They were built in the 1950s and were based on Soviet, German, and Italian designs and concepts developed prior to the Second World War. They were modified to improve their sea keeping capabilities, allowing them to run at high speed in the rough waters of the North Atlantic. The basic hull was more modern and had better armor protection than the vast majority of the post Second World War gun cruiser designs built and deployed by peer nations. They also carried an extensive suite of modern radar equipment and anti-aircraft artillery. The Soviets originally planned to build 40 ships in the class, which would be supported by the Stalingrad-class battlecruisers and aircraft carriers.

The Sverdlov class displaced 13,600 tons standard and 16,640 tons at full load. They were 210 metres (689 ft 0 in) long overall and 205 metres (672 ft 7 in) long at the waterline. They had a beam of 22 metres (72 ft 2 in) and draught of 6.9 metres (22 ft 8 in) and typically had a complement of 1,250. The hull was a completely welded new design and the ships had a double bottom for over 75% of their length. The ship also had twenty-three watertight bulkheads. The Sverdlovs had six boilers providing steam to two shaft geared steam turbines generating 118,100 shaft horsepower (88,100 kW). This gave the ships a maximum speed of 32.5 knots (60.2 km/h; 37.4 mph). The cruisers had a range of 9,000 nautical miles (17,000 km; 10,000 mi) at 18 knots (33 km/h; 21 mph).

Sverdlov-class cruisers main armament included twelve 152 mm (6 in)/57 cal B-38 guns mounted in four triple Mk5-bis turrets. They also had twelve 100 mm (3.9 in)/56 cal Model 1934 guns in six twin SM-5-1 mounts. For anti-aircraft weaponry, the cruisers had thirty-two 37 mm (1.5 in) anti-aircraft guns in sixteen twin mounts and were also equipped with ten 533 mm (21 in) torpedo tubes in two mountings of five each.

The Sverdlovs had 100 mm (3.9 in) belt armor and had a 50 mm (2.0 in) armored deck. The turrets were shielded by 175 mm (6.9 in) armor and the conning tower, by 150 mm (5.9 in) armor.

The cruisers' ultimate radar suite included one 'Big Net' or 'Top Trough' air search radar, one 'High Sieve' or 'Low Sieve' air search radar, one 'Knife Rest' air search radar and one 'Slim Net' air search radar. For navigational radar they had one 'Don-2' or 'Neptune' model. For fire control purposes the ships were equipped with two 'Sun Visor' radars, two 'Top Bow' 152 mm gun radars and eight 'Egg Cup' gun radars. For electronic countermeasures the ships were equipped with two 'Watch Dog' ECM systems.

== Construction and career ==
Admiral Ushakov was laid down on 29 September 1951 at Baltic Shipyard, Leningrad and launched on 31 August 1952. The vessel was commissioned on 18 August 1952. On 19 September 1953, she entered the 8th Navy. From 16 to 21 April 1954, she visited Stockholm, Sweden. In 1955, Admiral Ushakov won the prize of the Commander-in-Chief of the Navy for artillery shooting. On 24 December 1955, the cruiser transferred to the DKBF. On 3 November 1956, she was transferred to KSF. In 1957, the ship was tested to ensure take-off and landing of a helicopter on the runway.

From 19 to 22 October 1973, Admiral Ushakov visited Messina, Italy. From 7–10 August 1981, the cruiser visited Varna, Bulgaria. On 28 February 1983, the vessel was withdrawn from service and placed in reserve for the second time and mothballed in Sevastopol. On 16 September 1987, the cruiser was disarmed and removed from the Navy.

In 1992, she was sold to a private Indian firm for scrap in India.

=== Pennant numbers ===
Date	Pennant number
1954	6
1955	54
1955	33
1956	23
1957	21
1958	30
1961	203
1963	160
1967	120
	844
1971	860
1972	855
1973	859
1974	852
1979	109
1981	100
	108
1983	113
	101
