= Russian destroyer Admiral Ushakov =

Sovremenny-class destroyer of the Russian Navy

Coordinates: 69.0849802°N 33.4174671°E

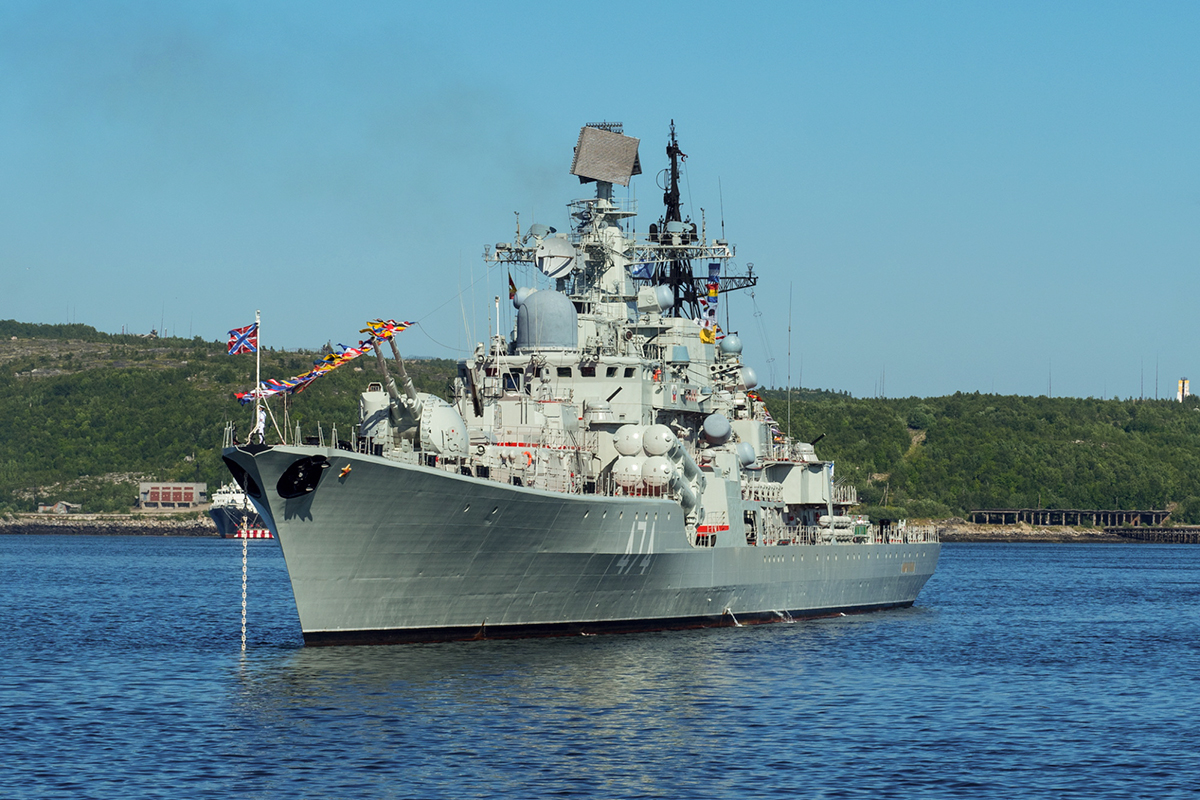
- Admiral Ushakov on 18 July 2018

History

Russia
- Name: Besstrashny; (Бесстрашный)
- Renamed: Admiral Ushakov; (Адмирал Ушаков)
- Namesake: Fearless in Russian; Fyodor Ushakov
- Builder: Severnaya Verf, Leningrad
- Laid down: 6 May 1988
- Launched: 19 January 1991
- Commissioned: 30 December 1993
- Decommissioned: 6 December 2025
- Home port: Kaliningrad
- Identification: Pennant number: 434, 474, 678, 694
- Status: Decommissioned

General characteristics
- Class & type: Sovremenny-class destroyer
- Displacement: 6,600 tons standard, 8,480 tons full load
- Length: 156 m (511 ft 10 in)
- Beam: 17.3 m (56 ft 9 in)
- Draught: 6.5 m (21 ft 4 in)
- Propulsion: 2 shaft steam turbines, 4 boilers, 75,000 kW (100,000 hp), 2 fixed propellers, 2 turbo generators, and 2 diesel generators
- Speed: 32.7 knots (60.6 km/h; 37.6 mph)
- Range: 3,920 nmi (7,260 km; 4,510 mi) at 18 knots (33 km/h; 21 mph); 1,345 nmi (2,491 km; 1,548 mi) at 33 knots (61 km/h; 38 mph)
- Complement: 350
- Sensors & processing systems: Radar: Air target acquisition radar, 3 × navigation radars, 130 mm gun fire-control radars, 30 mm air-defence gun fire control radar; Sonar: Active and passive under-keel sonar; ES: Tactical situation plotting board, anti-ship missile fire control system, air defence, missile fire-control system, and torpedo fire control system
- Electronic warfare & decoys: 2 PK-2 decoy dispensers (200 rockets)
- Armament: Guns: 4 (2 × 2) AK-130 130 mm naval guns; 4 × 30 mm AK-630 CIWS; Missiles; 8 (2 × 4) (SS-N-22 'Sunburn') anti-ship missiles; 48 (2 × 24) SA-N-7 'Gadfly' surface-to-air missiles; Anti-submarine: 2 × 2 533 mm torpedo tubes; 2 × 6 RBU-1000 300 mm anti-submarine rocket launchers
- Aircraft carried: 1× Ka-27 series helicopter
- Aviation facilities: Helipad

Admiral Ushakov is a Sovremenny-class destroyer of the Russian Navy. Previously she was named Besstrashny before being renamed in 2004.

== Development and design ==
The project began in the late 1960s when it was becoming obvious by the Soviet Navy that naval guns still had an important role particularly in support of amphibious landings, but existing gun cruisers and destroyers were showing their age. A new design was started, employing a new 130 mm automatic gun turret.

The ships were 156 metres (512 ft) in length, with a beam of 17.3 metres (56 ft 9 in) and a draught of 6.5 metres (21 ft 4 in).

== Construction and career ==
Besstrashny was laid down on 6 May 1988 and launched on 19 January 1991 by Severnaya Verf in Leningrad. She was commissioned on 30 December 1993.

From 2000 to 2004, she underwent medium repairs in the city of Severodvinsk at the Zvezdochka TsS OJSC. In 2004, Besstrashny changed her name to Admiral Ushakov, patronage relations were established with the Republic of Mordovia.

On June 9, 2016, Admiral Ushakov conducted a live firing exercise in the Barents Sea, including practicing a battle with a mock enemy's surface ship, engaging fast-moving small targets and floating sea mines. The artillery complexes AK-130 and AK-630 were involved in the firing.

In May 2018, she conducted artillery fire at coastal targets. The exercise involved artillery systems of the main caliber two AK-130 artillery mounts. The gunners worked out the defeat of an invisible target on the shore at a distance of more than 10 kilometers. The vessel encountered serious propulsion problems in 2018 and was earmarked to be scrapped. However, it was then decided to instead repair the propulsion system, as well as replace some of the electrical systems. The vessel returned to service in August 2021 and took part in Zapad-21 exercise along with frigate Admiral Kasatonov.

In December 2025 social media shared footage from Russian state-owned television channel Russia-1 showing the decommissioning of Admiral Ushakov from the Baltic Fleet in Kaliningrad.

== Gallery ==
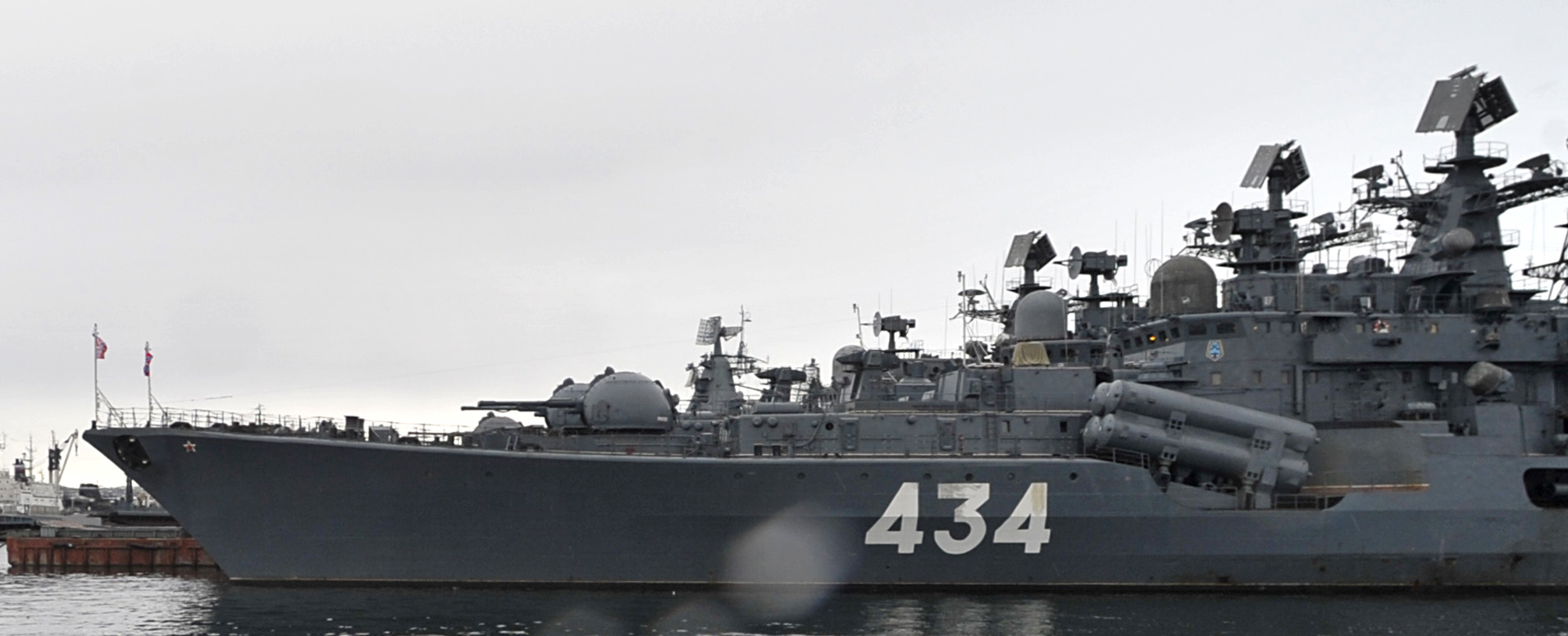
Admiral Ushakov in Severomorsk on 15 April 2011.

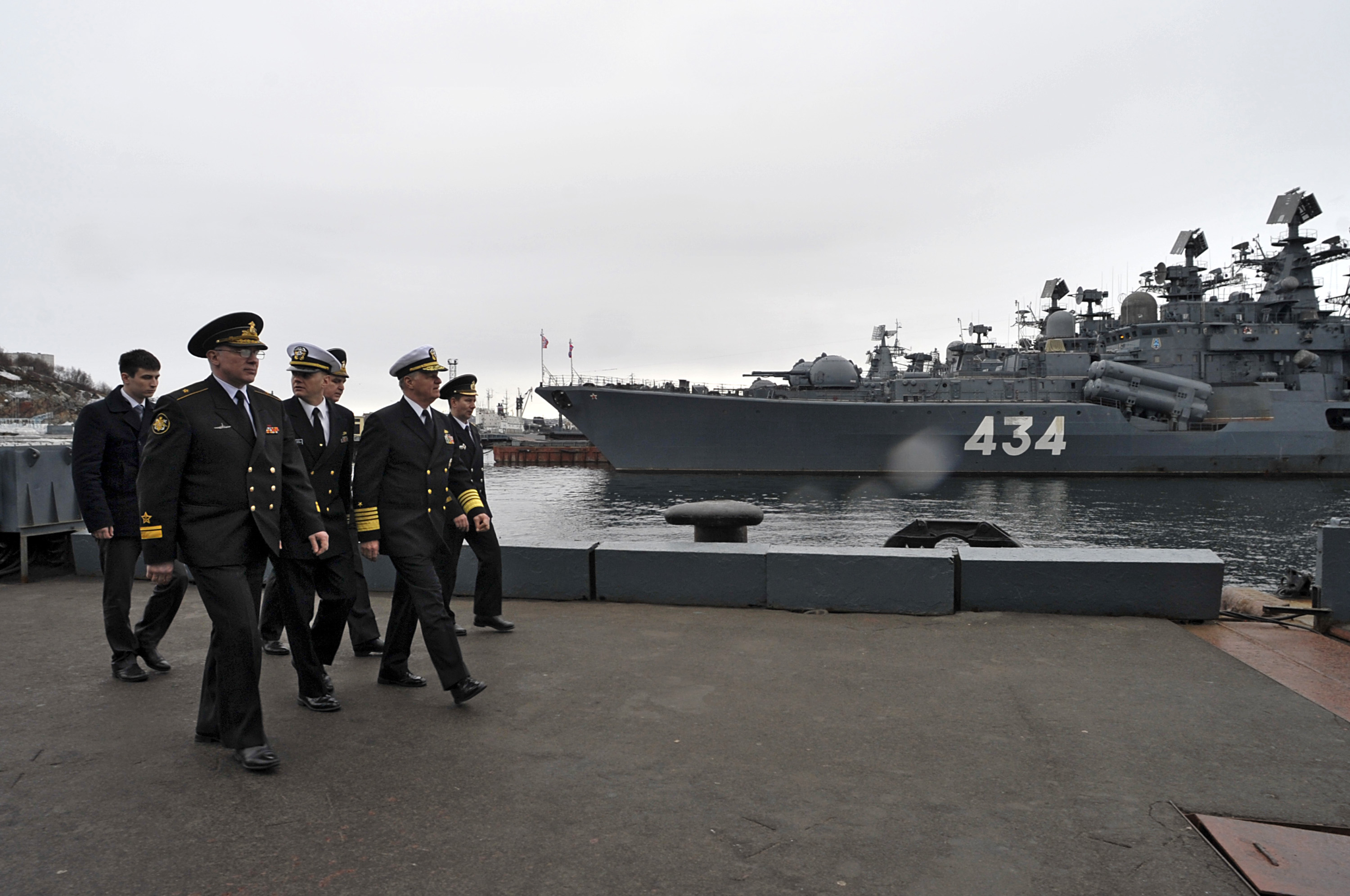
Admiral Ushakov in Severomorsk on 15 April 2011.

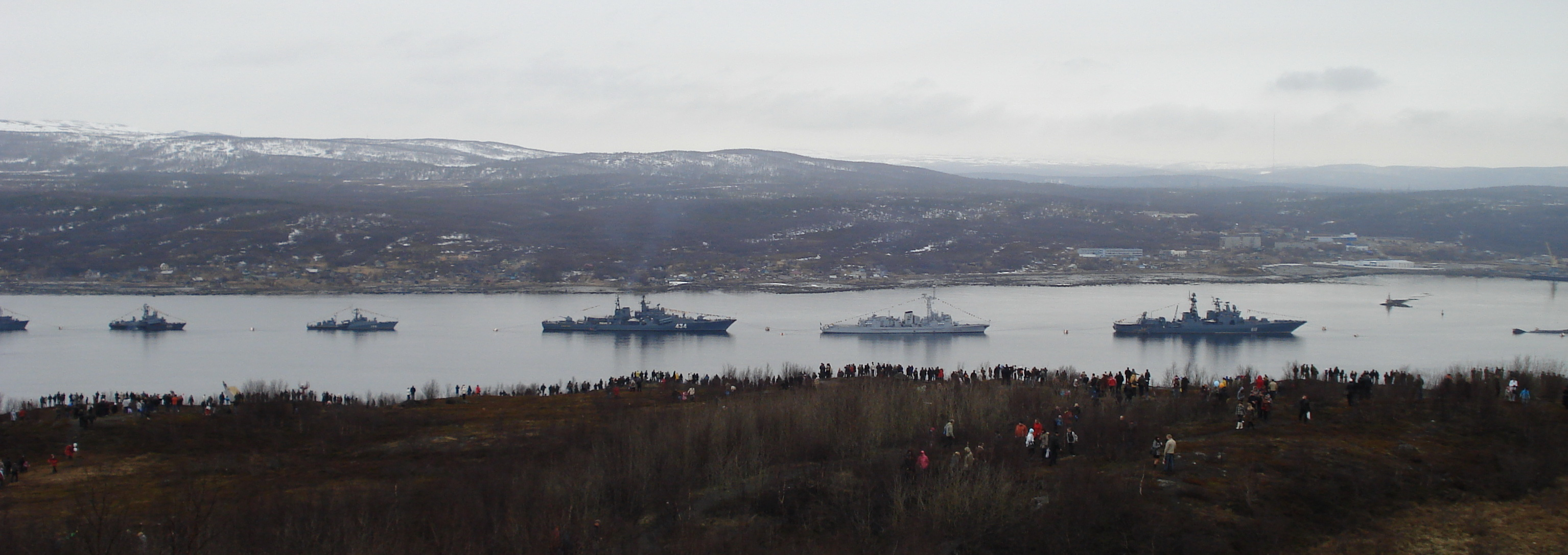
Admiral Ushakov in Severomorsk in 2011.

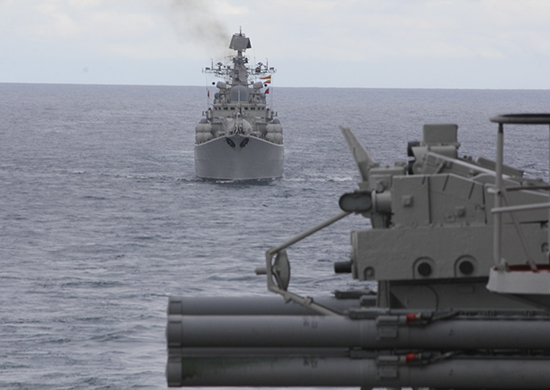
Admiral Ushakov in the Barents Sea during exercises. June 2021
