= Soviet cruiser Admiral Isachenkov =

Soviet Navy's Kresta II-class cruiser

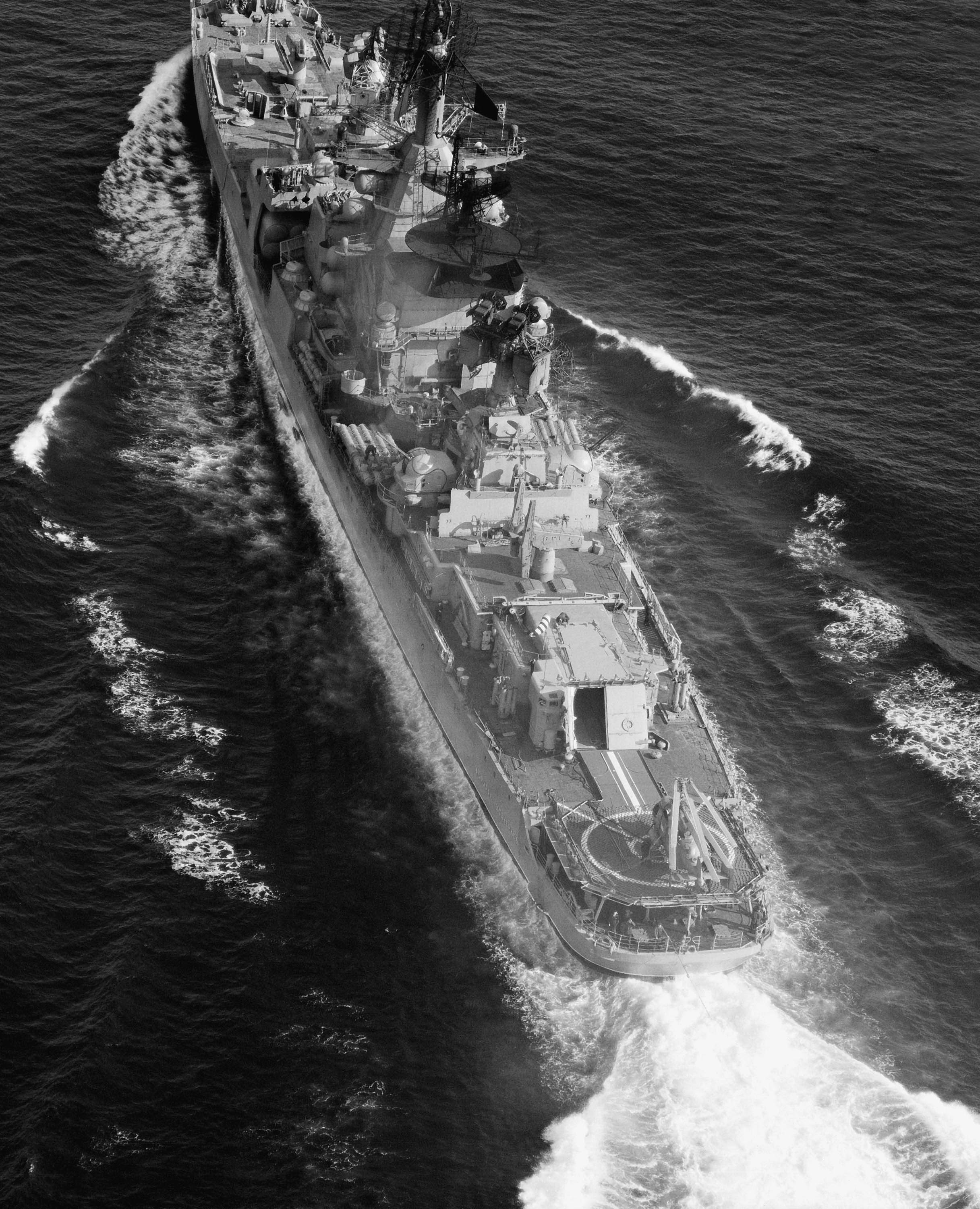
- Admiral Isachenkov underway in 1985

History

Soviet Union
- Name: Admiral Isachenkov
- Namesake: Nikolai Isachenkov
- Builder: Zhdanov Shipyard
- Laid down: 30 October 1970
- Launched: 28 March 1972
- Completed: 5 November 1974
- Stricken: 3 July 1992
- Fate: Sold to be broken up in India

General characteristics
- Class & type: Kresta II-class cruiser
- Displacement: 5,640 t (5,551 long tons) (standard); 7,575 t (7,455 long tons) (full load)
- Length: 156.5 m (513.5 ft) (o/a)
- Beam: 17.2 m (56.4 ft)
- Draught: 5.96 m (19.6 ft)
- Installed power: 4 × boilers; 91,000 shp (68,000 kW)
- Propulsion: 2 x steam turbines; 2 × shafts
- Speed: 34 knots (63 km/h; 39 mph)
- Range: 5,200 nmi (9,600 km; 6,000 mi) at 18 knots (33 km/h; 21 mph)
- Complement: 343
- Sensors & processing systems: Radar; MR-600 Voskhod early-warning radar; MR-310A Angara-A search radar; 2 x Volga navigational radars; 2 x 4R60 Grom, 2 x MR-103 Bars, 2 x MR-123 Vympel fire-control radars; Sonar; MG-332T Titan-2T
- Armament: 2 quad URPK-3 Metel anti-submarine systems (8 missiles); 2 twin M-11 Shtorm surface-to-air missile systems (48 missiles); 2 × twin 57 mm (2.2 in) AK-725 dual-purpose guns; 4 × sextuple 30 mm (1.2 in) AK-630 CIWS; 2 × quintuple 533 mm (21.0 in) torpedo tubes
- Aircraft carried: 1 Kamov Ka-25 'Hormone-A' helicopter
- Aviation facilities: Helicopter deck and hangar

Admiral Isachenkov (Russian: Адмирал Исаченков) was a Project 1134A Berkut A (NATO reporting name 'Kresta II'-class) large anti-submarine ship (Russian: Большой Противолодочный Корабль, BPK) of the Soviet Navy. The seventh ship of the class, the vessel was launched in 1972 and served during the Cold War with the Northern Fleet, often operating in the Atlantic Ocean but also travelling to various ports in the Mediterranean Sea. The ship acted as flagship for the Minister of Defence, Marshal of the Soviet Union Andrei Grechko, during the exercise Okean-75 in 1975 and operated alongside the newly launched Project 1143 Krechyet aircraft carrier Kiev in 1977 and 1978. The ship also shadowed the NATO aircraft carriers HMS Ark Royal, USS Independence and USS John F. Kennedy. The cruiser was taken out of service for repairs in 1981 and substantially upgraded with new weapons and communications systems, re-entering service in 1982. With the end of the Cold War, the Navy reassessed its need for large warships and, after a career stretching nearly twenty years, Admiral Isachenkov was decommissioned in 1992 and sold to be broken up.

== Design ==
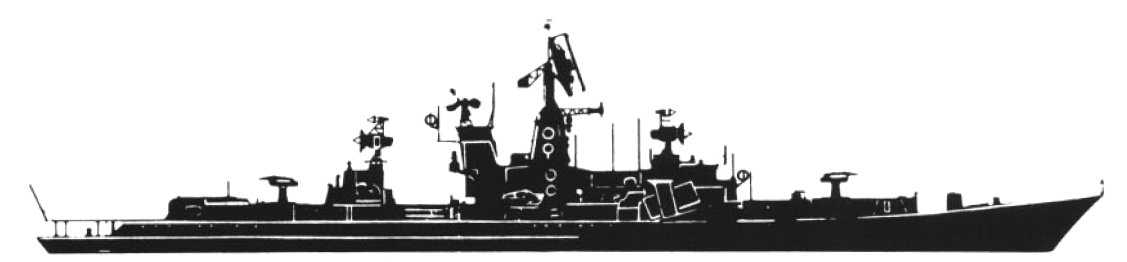
A United States Navy-produced profile drawing of a Kresta II-class cruiser

Admiral Isachenkov was the seventh ship of the class of ten Project 1134A Berkut A (NATO reporting name 'Kresta II'-class) cruisers, designed by Vasily Anikeyev. The class was designated as large anti-submarine ships (Russian: Большой Противолодочный Корабль, BPK) in accordance with their primary mission of countering NATO ballistic missile submarines, particularly the United States Navy fleet of Polaris-equipped submarines. However, before the ships began to be built, commander-in-chief of the Soviet Navy Admiral Sergey Gorshkov changed the role of the ships to that of destroying NATO attack submarines to allow Soviet Project 667A Navaga (NATO reporting name 'Yankee'-class) ballistic missile submarines to reach the central Atlantic and Pacific, from where the latter could launch their comparatively short-ranged ballistic missiles against targets in the United States.

Admiral Isachenkov was 156.5 metres (513.5 ft) long overall with a beam of 17.2 m (56.4 ft) and a draught of 5.96 m (19.6 ft). Displacement was 5,640 t (5,551 long tons) standard and 7,575 t (7,455 long tons) full load. The ship's complement was 343 officers and ratings. A hangar was fitted aft capable of handling a single Kamov Ka-25 (NATO reporting name 'Hormone-A') helicopter.

Admiral Isachenkov was propelled by two TV-12-1 geared steam turbines each powered by four high-pressure boilers, with the forward engine room powering the port screw and the aft the starboard. Total power was 91,000 shaft horsepower (67,859 kW), giving a maximum speed of 34 knots (63 km/h; 39 mph). The ship had a range of 5,200 nautical miles (9,630 km; 5,984 mi) at 18 kn (33 km/h; 21 mph) and 1,755 nmi (3,250 km; 2,020 mi) at 32 kn (59 km/h; 37 mph).

=== Armament ===
As the ship's primary role was as an anti-submarine warship, Admiral Isachenkov mounted two KT-106 quadruple launchers for eight 85R anti-submarine missiles in the URPK-3 Metel system (NATO reporting name SS-N-14 'Silex'). This was backed up by two stern RBU-6000 12-barrel and two forward RBU-1000 6-barrel rocket launchers to protect against close-in threats. The Ka-25 helicopter embarked on the ship was also capable of aiding in the search and destruction of submarines, and as such could carry depth charges and torpedoes. The 85R missiles could also be used against surface threats.

For defence against aerial threats, Admiral Isachenkov was armed with the M-11 Shtorm system (NATO reporting name SA-N-3 'Goblet'), which included two twin B-187A launchers, one forward of the bridge and the other forward of the hangar, for 48 V-611 (4K60) surface-to-air missiles in two barrel loaders of 24 missiles each. The vessel also had four AK-725 57 mm (2.2 in) L/80 dual-purpose guns situated in two twin mountings, one on either side aft of the funnel, to protect against surface and aerial threats. Although not envisaged in the original design, four AK-630 sextuple 30 mm (1.2 in) close-in weapon systems were added during construction. Two quintuple PT-53-1134A mountings for 533 mm (21 in) torpedoes were also fitted aft of the funnel which could be used in both the anti-shipping and anti-submarine role.

=== Electronic warfare ===
Admiral Isachenkov was equipped with the MR-600 Voskhod (NATO reporting name 'Top Sail') early-warning radar, supported by a MR-310A Angara-A (NATO reporting name 'Head Net C') search radar, and two Volga (NATO reporting names 'Don Kay' and 'Don-2') navigational radars. The MR-310A was an advanced system that could track up to 15 targets at a range of up to 40 km (25 mi). The improved MG-332T Titan-2T hull-mounted sonar was fitted in a bulbous radome for anti-submarine warfare. For fire-control purposes the vessel had Grom-M for the surface-to-air missiles, MR-103 Bars for the AK-725 and MR-123 Vympel for the AK-630. Admiral Isachenkov was also fitted with an MG-26 communications outfit and an MG-35 Shtil passive sonar.

The ship's electronic warfare equipment included the MRP-15-16 Zaliv and two sets each of the MRP-11-12 and MRP-13-14 direction-finding systems, as well as the MRP-150 Gurzuf A and MRP-152 Gurzuf B radar-jamming devices.

== Construction and career ==
Built in the Zhdanov Shipyard with the yard number 727, Admiral Isachenkov, named for the Soviet official responsible for shipbuilding and armaments, Nikolai Isachenkov, whose leadership led to the development of this class of warships, was laid down on 30 October 1970 and launched on 28 March 1972. The ship commenced trials in the Baltic Sea on 27 September 1974 and completed on 5 November 1974, being commissioned under the command of Captain 2nd Rank G. V. Sivukhin. During the trials, air, surface and underwater surveillance systems were tested, seven anti-aircraft and four anti-submarine missiles were launched, the guns were fired and a torpedo was released.

=== 1970s ===
On 5 December, Admiral Isachenkov entered service with the Northern Fleet, and on 5 March the following year hosted the Minister of Defence, Marshal of the Soviet Union Andrei Grechko. Between 3 and 21 April, the vessel then acted as a flagship during the open ocean exercise Okean-75 under his leadership. This was then followed by service off the coast of Norway between 15 September and 22 November, including tracking the United States Navy aircraft carrier USS Independence. The ship's helicopter also approached the aircraft carrier HMS Ark Royal of the Royal Navy, flying close to the bow to take photographs of the aircraft on the flight deck. The vessel proved suited to the role of monitoring NATO vessels. Almost a year later, between August and October 1976, the ship once again observed NATO aircraft carriers, this time USS John F. Kennedy as well as Ark Royal, alongside sister ship Marshal Timoshenko.

Between August and October 1977, the ship was part of an experiment to find a form of emergency underwater acoustic communication through detonating bombs in code, using the MG-35 Shtil. Although the trial was a success, the signals were very distorted due to the unreliability of the explosions. Admiral Isachenkov finished the year as an escort to the new Project 1143 Krechyet (NATO reporting name 'Kiev' class) aircraft carrier Kiev. Joining the new capital ship on 20 December, the flotilla took to the Atlantic Ocean and, off the coast of Cape Finisterre on 7 January, met the Project 1134B Berkut B (NATO reporting name 'Kara' class) ship Kerch which then took on the escort role. Admiral Isachenkov then continued to serve in the North Atlantic until 12 April. After a scheduled repair, the vessel rejoined Kiev and Marshal Timoshenko to serve as a military task force, entering the Mediterranean Sea on 12 June 1979.

=== 1980s and end of service ===
The start of the new decade found Admiral Isachenkov serving in the Mediterranean, an operation that continued until 26 April 1980. Between 27 and 30 June 1980, the ship served again as the flagship for an exercise in the Atlantic, this time Atlantic-80. Returning to the Mediterranean, the vessel then undertook manoeuvres with Kiev and the Project 1123 Kondor (NATO reporting name 'Moskva' class) helicopter cruiser Leningrad between 4 January and 18 September 1981. During these operations, it was not just Soviet vessels that accompanied Admiral Isachenkov. British and Dutch frigates, such as HMS Ardent, shadowed the Soviet vessels as they transited through the English Channel in the middle of 1981.

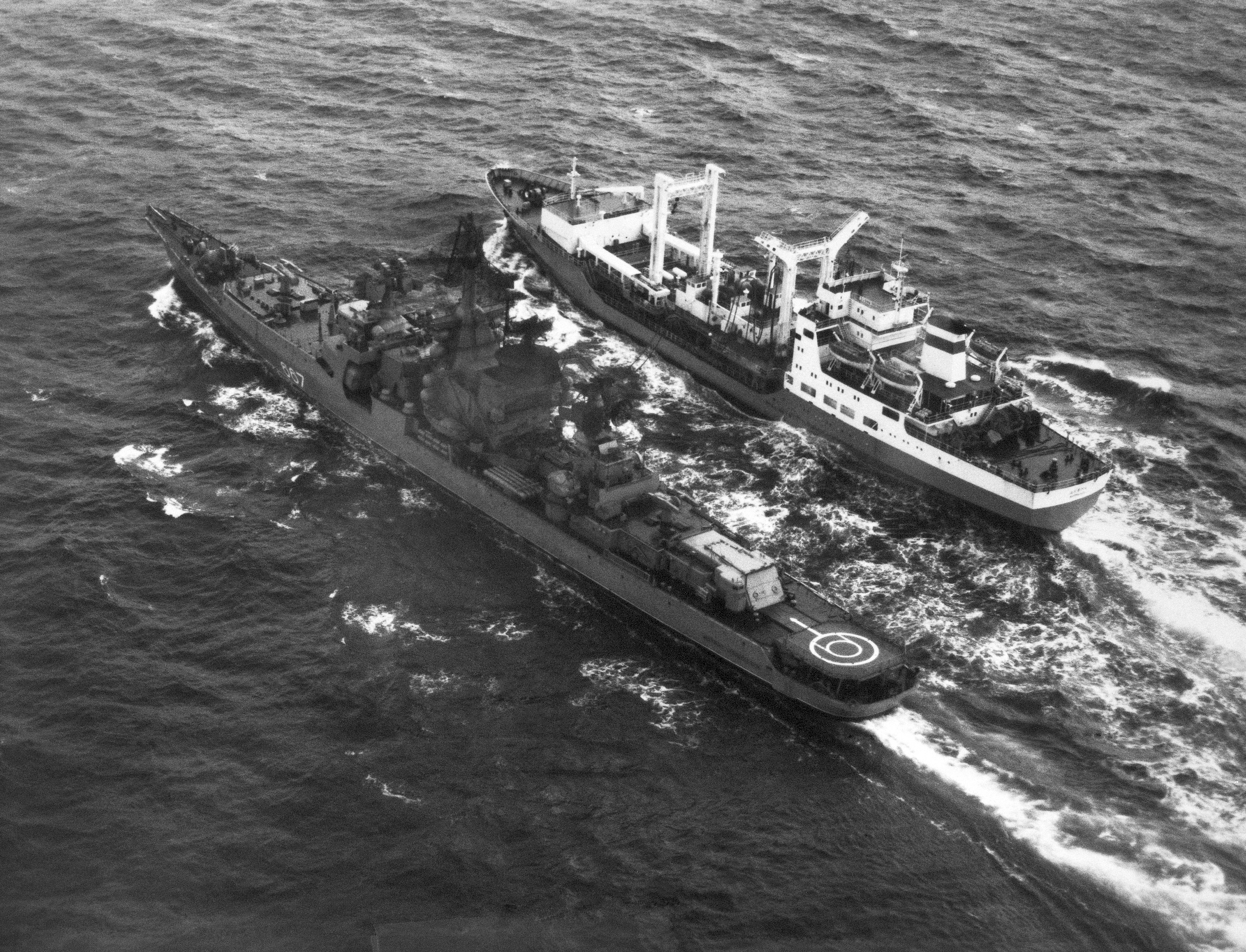
Admiral Isachenkov refueling while underway, 1985

Between 19 December 1981 and 1 August 1982, the vessel was in Kronstadt being repaired, and the main armament was upgraded to URPK-5 Rastrub (SS-N-14B). The new missiles, designated 85RU, provided a greater anti-ship capability than those that they replaced. The Shlyuz satellite navigation system and the Tsunami-BM satellite communication systems were also fitted. Once back in service, Admiral Isachenkov rejoined Kiev on 5 January 1987 for manoeuvres in the Mediterranean Sea and the Atlantic Ocean, serving until 24 June and observing the USS Nimitz carrier battle group. During this time, between 2 and 5 June, the vessel also made an official visit to Tripoli, Libya.

With the end of the Cold War and the dissolution of the Soviet Union in 1991, the navy reassessed its need for a large fleet and decided to retire some of its larger and more expensive ships. In addition, after nearly twenty years in service, Admiral Isachenkov was suffering from deteriorating weapons and electronic systems. The cost of upgrades and repairs was considered unjustifiably high and instead, on 3 July 1992, the vessel was struck and withdrawn from service. The ship was decommissioned and subsequently sold to an Indian company to be broken up.

During the vessel's career, Admiral Isachenkov was assigned the temporary tactical numbers 588, 584, 643, 686, 672, 667 and 640.
