= Soviet ship Novorossiysk =

Two ships of the Soviet Navy have been named after the city of Novorossiysk on the Black Sea:

- Novorossiysk - a Conte di Cavour-class battleship of the Italian Navy previously named Giulio Cesare, taken by the Soviet Union as reparations following the end of the Second World War.
- Soviet aircraft carrier Novorossiysk - a Kiev-class aircraft carrier

== See also ==
- Russian ship Novorossiysk
