= List of aviation cruisers built in the Soviet Union =

This list of aviation cruisers built in the Soviet Union comprises all aviation cruisers (Note: Ukrainian: авіаносний крейсер, romanized: avianosnyj krejser. Russian: авианесущий крейсер, romanized: avianesushchij krejser.) constructed in the same Black Sea Shipyard of Mykolaiv (Note: Russian-derived spelling: Nikolayev.) in the Ukrainian SSR. (Note: In the strict sense, the Soviet Union never completed what is known in English as aircraft carriers; instead, it completed only what it called aviation cruisers, in part to circumvent the Montreux Convention. One supercarrier, Ulyanovsk, was designed and under construction by the time the Soviet Union disintegrated in December 1991, and was scrapped in independent Ukraine in 1992. No aviation cruiser of the Soviet Union was ever built anywhere else than in the shipyard of Mykolaiv in the Ukrainian SSR. Neither the Russian Federation (since 1991) nor the Russian Empire (before 1917) has ever constructed an aviation cruiser, let alone an aircraft carrier. Independent Ukraine only partially completed some aviation cruisers that were already under construction in the Ukrainian SSR, but did not order or build any new ones.) As of 2026, one of these Soviet-built aviation cruisers is still in Indian service, another still in Chinese service; the rest has been decommissioned. Although sometimes called "aircraft carriers", none of them (with the exception of the never-completed Ulyanovsk) have been classed as a "true" aircraft carrier (supercarrier). Specifically, they were all ASW helicopter carriers or aircraft cruisers, including the Admiral Kuznetsov, the only carrier that was still in service with the Russian Navy until it was decommissioned in 2025.

Name	Class	Type	Commission	Decommissioned	Notes
Moskva	Moskva class	Helicopter carrier	1967	1996	
Leningrad	Moskva class	Helicopter carrier	1969	1991	
Kiev	Kiev class	Aircraft cruiser	1975	1993	Sold to Chinese company. Converted to military theme park, then hotel.
Minsk	Kiev class	Aircraft cruiser	1978	1993	Sold initially for scrap. Re-sold to China as museum piece.
Novorossiysk	Kiev class	Aircraft cruiser	1982	1993	Scrapped in 1997 in Pohang, South Korea.
Admiral Flota Sovetskogo Soyuza Gorshkov (Baku till 1991)	Kiev class (modified)	Aircraft cruiser	1987	1996	Modified, rebuilt and sold to India. Re-commissioned 2013 as INS Vikramaditya.
Admiral Flota Sovetskogo Soyuza Kuznetsov	Admiral Kuznetsov	Aircraft cruiser	1990	2025	Decommissionned from the Russian Navy.
Varyag	Admiral Kuznetsov	Aircraft cruiser	2012		Launched 1988, construction stopped 1992; hull sold by Ukraine to China. Completed 2012 as Liaoning.
Ulyanovsk	Ulyanovsk	Supercarrier			Keel laid 1988, stopped 1991, scrapped 1992.

== Trivia ==
As of 2017, Russia was considering building a supercarrier, code-named Project Shtorm. As of 2026, the proposal still has not been approved.

== See also ==
- Project 1153 Orel
- Project 23000 aircraft carrier
- List of aircraft carriers
- List of aircraft carriers in service
- List of aircraft carriers by country
- Timeline for aircraft carrier service
- List of aircraft carriers by configuration
