= Russian ship Novorossiysk =

Three ships of the Soviet Navy and Russian Navy have been named for the city of Novorossiysk on the Black Sea:

- Novorossiysk – a Conte di Cavour-class battleship of the Italian Navy previously named Giulio Cesare, taken by the Soviet Union as reparations following the end of the Second World War.
- Soviet aircraft carrier Novorossiysk – a Kiev-class aircraft carrier
- Russian submarine Novorossiysk – a Varshavyanka-class submarine
