= Flight deck cruiser =

Proposed American aircraft cruiser

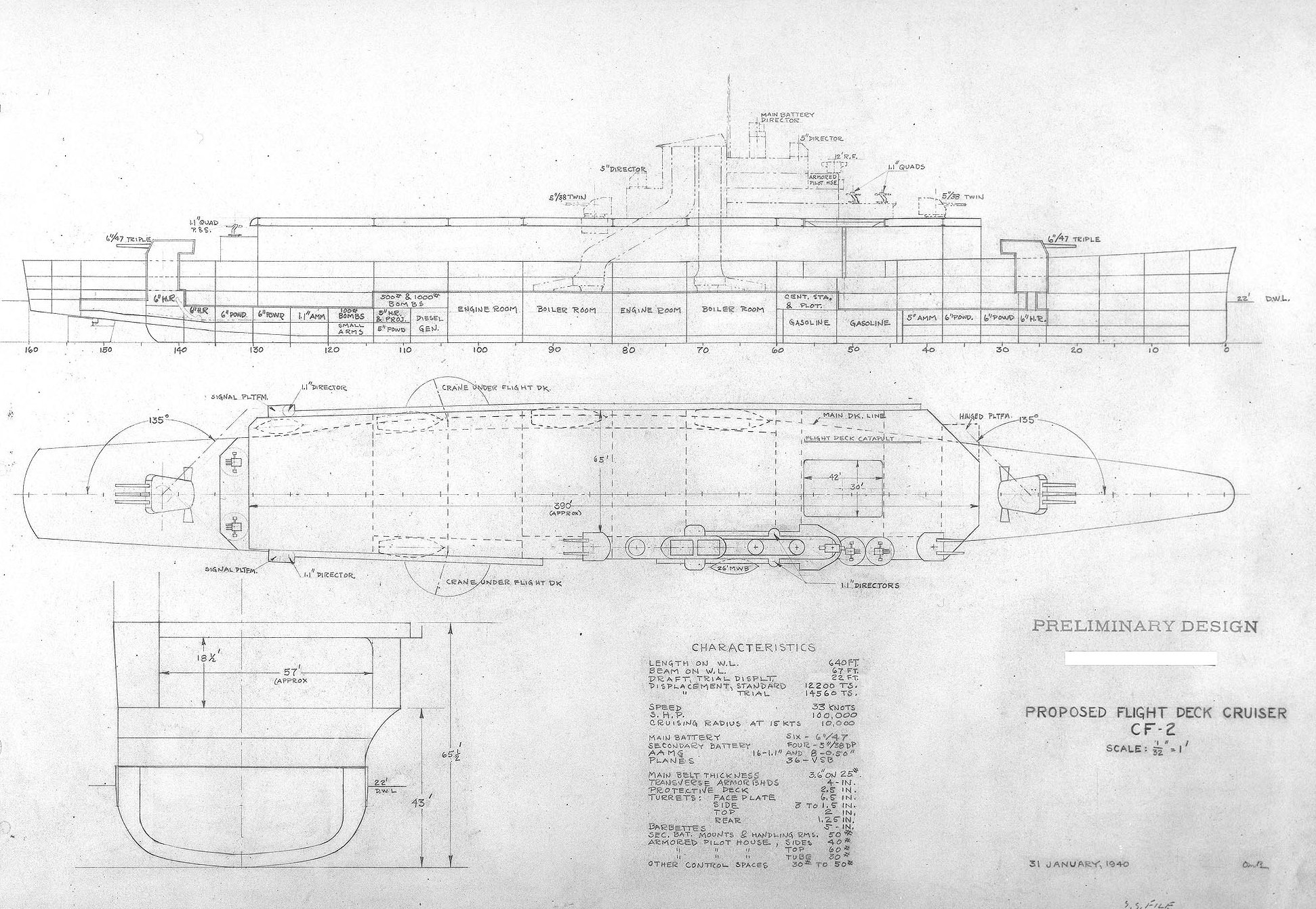
Preliminary design plan for the CF-2 type flight deck cruiser as envisioned in January 1940

The flight-deck cruiser was a proposed type of aircraft cruiser, (warships combining features of aircraft carriers and light cruisers), designed by the United States Navy during the Interwar period (between World War I and World War II). Several designs were proposed for the type, but none were approved for construction. The final design was developed just before World War II, and the entry of the United States into the war saw the project come to an end.

== Background ==
In the 1920s, following the signing of the Washington Naval Treaty, the United States Navy converted two incomplete battlecruisers into aircraft carriers, USS Lexington and USS Saratoga. These conversions proved to be extremely expensive, and designs were sought that would provide aircraft carrying capability for the fleet at a more reasonable cost. USS Ranger, America's first purpose-built aircraft carrier, was of a smaller, more economical design than the battlecruiser conversions, however the ship sacrificed the big-gun scouting capability of the earlier ships. In an attempt to develop a ship capable of both carrying aircraft and engaging the enemy in the scouting role, the "flight-deck cruiser" concept was developed, following a series of studies proposing the conversion of cruisers under construction into carriers, all of which were rejected. In addition to providing an economical method of providing additional aircraft for the fleet, the "flight-deck cruiser" was seen to have an additional advantage; it would be considered a cruiser under the terms of the Washington Treaty, not an aircraft carrier, and thus the Navy would not be restricted in the number of ships of the type that could be built.

== Designs ==
Several designs were proposed for a ship carrying both aircraft and a gun armament equivalent to a light cruiser's. One design, from 1930, was described as "a Brooklyn-class light cruiser forwards [and] one half of a Wasp-class aircraft carrier aft", and utilized an early version of the angled deck that would in the 1950s be adopted for use by fleet carriers. The vessel, 650 feet (200 m) in length, had a 350-foot (110 m) flight deck and hangar aft for twenty-four aircraft, while forwards three triple 6-inch (152 mm) gun turrets were mounted, the standard armament for a light cruiser of the time. A secondary dual purpose armament of eight 5-inch (127 mm) guns was also projected to be carried for defense against enemy torpedo-boats and aircraft.

In 1934, another design for a flight-deck cruiser was proposed, featuring twelve 6 in (152 mm) guns, mounted forwards and aft with a 200-foot (61 m) flight deck in between; while a 1939 revival of the concept proposed two triple turrets, fore and aft, again with an amidships flight deck.

In December 1939, a design for a much larger flight-deck cruiser, displacing 12,000 tons, was proposed, fitted with two catapults, a triple turret for 8-inch (203 mm) guns, and a 420-foot (130 m) flight deck; by January 1940 the design had been shrunk to a flight deck 390 feet (120 m) in length and two triple 6 in (152 mm) guns for main armament.

== Abandonment ==
Despite the continued designs and interest in the idea, no funding was ever appropriated for the construction of a flight-deck cruiser; in addition, evaluation of the design by the Naval War College determined that even a 12,000-ton ship was too small for the concept's intended characteristics to be effectively realized, and thus the ship would be ineffective in battle. In 1940, the design was formally shelved, although provision was made for reconsideration of the concept at a future date. The entry of the United States into World War II following the bombing of Pearl Harbor, however, removed the primary justifications for the concept of a hybrid warship, as naval limitations treaties were now moot and adequate funding was now available for the construction of more conventional ships. As a result, the flight deck cruiser concept was never revisited.

== Similar ships ==
Although no flight-deck cruisers were ever built by the U.S. Navy, the Soviet Union's Kiev-class aircraft carrier, developed in the 1970s, is remarkably similar to that of the original flight-deck cruiser design, featuring an angled flight deck aft with anti-ship missile launchers forwards.

In addition, during the early 1980s, plans were proposed for the reactivation of the U.S. Navy's Iowa-class battleships that entailed the removal of each ship's aft turret and the installation of a flight deck for operating V/STOL aircraft; in the end a much more modest conversion, lacking the flight deck, was carried out. An article in the U.S. Naval Institute's Proceedings proposed a canted flight deck with steam catapult and arrestor wires for F/A-18 Hornet fighters. Plans for these conversions were dropped in 1984.

== See also ==
- Moskva-class helicopter carrier
- Invincible-class aircraft carrier
- Vittorio Veneto-class helicopter carrier
