= RPK-1 Vikhr =

RPK-1 Vikhr (NATO code SUW-N-1 or FRAS-1)
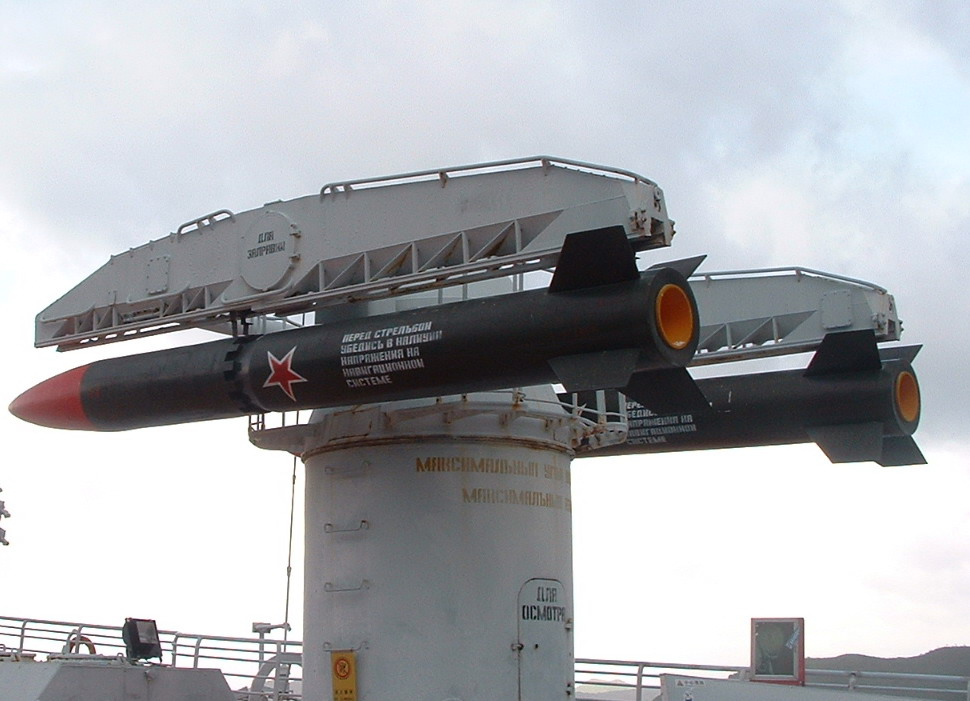
- SUW-N-1 missile launcher on the aircraft carrier Minsk
- Type: Standoff anti-submarine ballistic missile
- Place of origin: USSR

Service history
- In service: 1968
- Used by: Soviet Navy

Specifications
- Mass: 1800 kg
- Length: 6.0 m
- Diameter: 0.54 m
- Warhead: 10 kt (42 TJ) nuclear depth bomb
- Engine: Solid propellant rocket motor
- Operational range: 10–24 km
- Maximum speed: Mach 1.8
- Launch platform: Moskva class and Kiev class aircraft carriers

The RPK-1 Vikhr NATO reporting name SUW-N-1 (Russian: РПК-1 «Вихрь» - meaning Whirlwind) was a Soviet nuclear anti submarine missile system. FRAS-1 was the NATO code for the missile round itself.

The development of the missile was ordered in 1960 in order to combat the new American nuclear submarines. The requirement was for an all weather weapon capable of reaching out to 20 km at speed. The first test was in 1964 and the system was installed on the Moskva class helicopter cruisers in 1967. The system was also installed on the Kiev class aircraft carriers. The systems were decommissioned in the 1990s.

== Launchers ==
There were two models of launcher:

- MS-18 used in the Moskva class - a two arm launcher with a rotary magazine holding 8 missiles
- MS-32 used in the Kiev class - a two arm launcher with two rotary magazines holding 16 missiles

A prototype launcher was mounted on the Petya class frigate SKR-1 for testing in 1964

== Missile ==
The missile was a two-stage rocket with inertial guidance, which could not be corrected after launch. The missile carried a nuclear depth bomb warhead of up to 10 kilotons in yield. The warhead could detonate at a depth of up to 200 m and had a lethal radius of 1.2 to 1.5 km against a submarine target.

== Fire Control ==
The ships fitted with the RPK-1 had the Sprut fire control system (PUSTB-1123), which was developed by CDB-209 [2] and included:

- A central control unit, (TSPUS)
- The Tiphon fire control computer
- Gyro stabilisers
- Link to the sonar system
- Remote power control of the launcher

== See also ==
- RUR-5 ASROC- American equivalent
