= Soviet helicopter carrier Moskva =

Helicopter carrier in the Soviet Navy

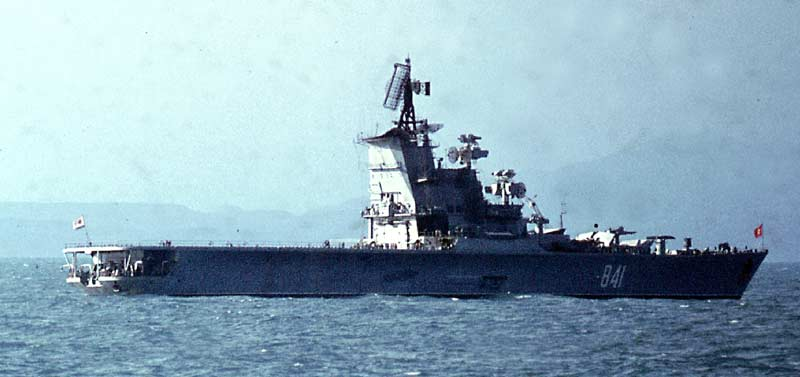
- Moskva off the coast of Morocco in January, 1970

History

→ Soviet Union → Russia
- Name: Moskva
- Namesake: Moskva
- Builder: Soviet Union Nikolayev South Shipyard
- Launched: January 14, 1965
- Commissioned: December 25, 1967
- Decommissioned: 1996
- Fate: Scrapped

General characteristics
- Class & type: Moskva-class helicopter carrier
- Displacement: 11,920 tons (standard); 15,280 tons (loaded)
- Length: 189.0 m (620.1 ft)
- Beam: 34.0 m (111.5 ft)
- Draught: 7.7 m (25.3 ft)
- Propulsion: geared steam turbines, two shaft, 4 pressure-fired boilers; 100,000 shp (75,000 kW)
- Speed: 31 knots (57 km/h)
- Range: 14,000 nautical miles (26,000 km) at 12 knots (22 km/h)
- Complement: 850
- Armament: M-11 Shtorm' SAM 2 twin launchers, 2 × twin 57 mm guns, 1 × SUW-N-1 launcher for FRAS-1 anti submarine missiles, 2 × RBU-6000 ASW rockets, 10 × 553 mm torpedo tubes (2 × 5)
- Aircraft carried: 14 Ka-25 'Hormone' helicopters

Moskva was the first of her class of helicopter carriers in service with the Soviet Navy. Laid down at Nikolayev South (Shipyard No.444), Moskva was launched in 1965 and she was commissioned two years later. Moskva was followed by Leningrad, which was commissioned in late 1968; there were no further vessels built, reportedly due to the poor handling of the ships in rough seas. Both were conventionally powered.

== History ==
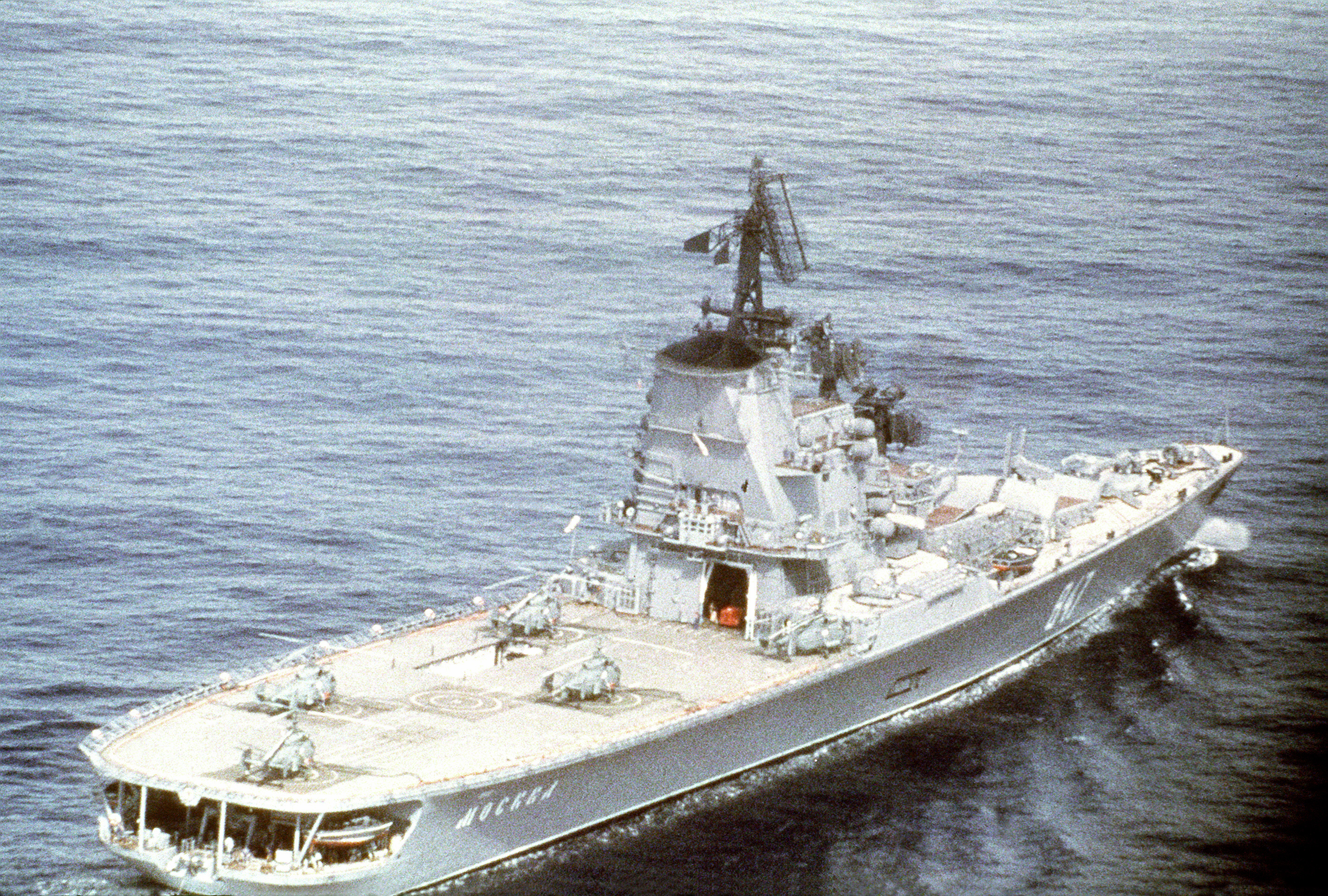
A starboard quarter view of Moskva

The Moskvas were not true "aircraft carriers" in that they did not carry any fixed-wing aircraft; the air wing was composed entirely of helicopters. They were designed primarily as anti-submarine warfare (ASW) vessels, and her weapons and sensor suite was optimized against the nuclear submarine threat. Shipboard ASW armament included a twin SUW-N-1 launcher capable of delivering a FRAS-1 projectile carrying a 450 mm torpedo (or a 5 kiloton nuclear warhead); a pair of RBU-6000 ASW mortars; and a set of torpedo tubes. For self-defense, the Moskvas had two twin SA-N-3 SAM launchers with reloads for a total of 48 surface-to-air missiles, along with two twin 57 mm/80 guns. A "Mare Tail" variable depth sonar worked in conjunction with heliborne sensors to hunt submarines.

Their strategic role was to defend the Soviet ballistic missile submarine bastions against incursions by Western attack submarines, forming the flagships of an ASW task force.

On 2 February 1975, a fire in the ship's bow caused severe damage. She was out of action for a year while repairs were made. Leningrad was taken out of service in 1991, but Moskva remained in service until the late 1990s, when she, too, was scrapped.
