= Bastion (naval) =

Naval strategy

A bastion in naval strategy is a heavily defended area of water in which friendly naval forces can operate safely. Typically, that area will be partially enclosed by friendly shoreline, defended by naval mines, monitored by sensors, and heavily patrolled by surface, submarine, and air forces.

== Soviet and Russian naval bastions ==
The bastion became an important strategy for the ballistic missile submarine fleets of the Soviet Union during the Cold War. The Barents Sea was made a bastion for the Soviet Red Banner Northern Fleet, and the Sea of Okhotsk for the Soviet Pacific Fleet, both of which remain important to the Russian Northern Fleet and the Russian Pacific Fleet.

The Soviet Union had (and, even more so, Russia now has) limited access to the world's oceans: her northern coast is ice-bound at least the majority of the year, and access to the Atlantic requires transiting the GIUK gap; much of her eastern coast is also ice-bound and requires moderately close approaches to either Alaska or Japan; travel from her southern ports involves transiting first the Bosphorus and Dardanelles, and then either the Strait of Gibraltar or the Suez Canal.

The Soviet Navy originally attempted to directly contest with the navies of NATO for control of the blue-water ocean. As the Cold War progressed, however, it became clear that the Soviets could not win a toe-to-toe fight in the deep water, and the information sold to the Soviets by the Walker spy ring in the 1980s made it clear that the ballistic missile submarines, in particular, were very unlikely to be able to carry out their nuclear attack missions.

Realizing their vulnerability, the Soviets adopted a two-level approach. They armed their older, noisier, and less reliable "second generation" ballistic missile submarines with shorter-range nuclear weapons and deployed them as close as possible to the United States. Soviet submarine K-219, which suffered a catastrophic explosion and fire off Bermuda on 3 October 1986, was one such boat. Meanwhile, they used the information provided by Walker to build both dramatically improved attack boats such as the Akula-class submarine, as well as more-survivable "boomers" such as the Typhoon-class submarine armed with increasingly accurate and long-range missiles. Then they held those "third-generation" boats close to home, patrolling only near and under the Arctic ice cap. To secure the bastions, they also built large numbers of Sovremennyy and Udaloy-class destroyers, whose primary mission was anti-submarine barrier and picket patrol; furthermore, the Soviet carrier-building projects were dedicated to defense of these bastions as well rather than independent strike groups, with Moskva class limited to anti-submarine helicopters, Kiev class carrying VTOL fighters as well as helicopters and a sizeable array of weapons (hence the designation "aircraft-carrying cruiser"), and, finally, Kuznetsov-class "heavy aircraft-carrying cruiser" fielding fixed-wing interceptors.

The United States Navy practiced penetrating these bastions; one such attempt resulted in the 20 March 1993 collision between USS Grayling and K-407 Novomoskovsk, a Delfin-class ballistic missile submarine. The collision was inadvertent and potentially catastrophic but did demonstrate that US attack submarines were able to get rather near their intended prey.

== Chinese naval bastions ==
There are indications that the Chinese PLAN is adopting the concept as well, fortifying the Bohai Sea for use by its growing number of ballistic missile submarines. Additionally, China has built a large submarine base on Hainan Island, giving speculation that China might be using the South China Sea as naval bastion. Parts of the South China Sea are deep enough for nuclear submarines to operate.

Chinese naval bastions are far more crowded than Soviet ones. There is a lot of commercial traffic in the South China, East China, and Yellow Sea (by contrast, the Soviet bastion of Sea of Okhotsk and the Kara Sea were isolated). This makes it easier for the Chinese to hide their submarines in these waters. It also makes it easier for enemy submarines to infiltrate into these waters and potentially attack Chinese submarines.

One implication of the bastion strategy is that Chinese SSBNs will not be able to strike the mainland United States, given the limited range of JL-2 and given that the range of JL-3 remains uncertain.

The United States has radars monitoring these areas. There are two AN/TPY-2 radars deployed in Japan, one in South Korea and there is PAVE PAWS in Taiwan. Taiwan denies sharing the data with the US, but the Chinese believe that the two countries do share information. The US has also deployed the P8-A Poseidon maritime patrol aircraft to Okinawa, Japan, the Philippines, and Singapore, and might do so in Malaysia as well.

== American naval bastions ==
In the sense that a bastion is set up to protect the naval forces themselves rather than a land feature (e.g. the Panama Canal), the United States Navy has never made significant use of the bastion concept.
