= RUR-5 ASROC =

Anti-submarine missile system

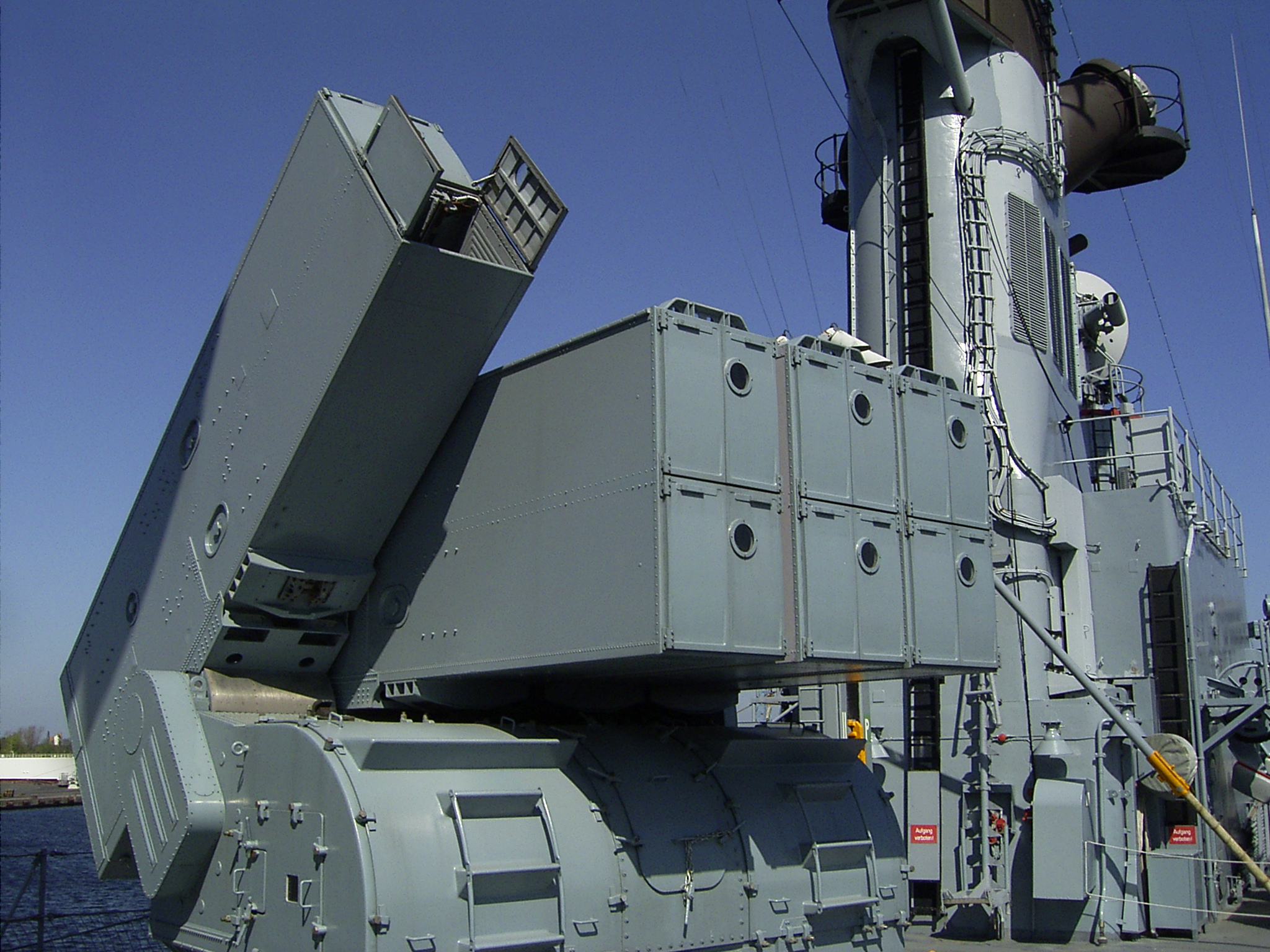
- ASROC Launcher on board the German destroyer Mölders
- Type: Anti-submarine missile
- Place of origin: United States

Service history
- In service: 1961
- Used by: United States Navy and others

Production history
- Designer: Naval Ordnance Test Station Pasadena; Honeywell
- Manufacturer: Honeywell
- Unit cost: Approximately $350,000 (not including warhead)

Specifications
- Mass: 1,073 pounds (487 kg)
- Length: 14.75 ft (4.50 m)
- Diameter: 16.6 inches (420 mm)
- Wingspan: 26 7/8 inches (680 mm)
- Warhead: Mark 46 torpedo, 96.8 pounds (43.9 kg) of PBXN-103 high explosive; 10 kt (42 TJ) W44 nuclear warhead (retired)
- Detonation mechanism: Payload specific
- Engine: Solid propellant rocket motor
- Operational range: 6 mi (9.7 km)
- Maximum speed: Subsonic
- Launch platform: Surface ships

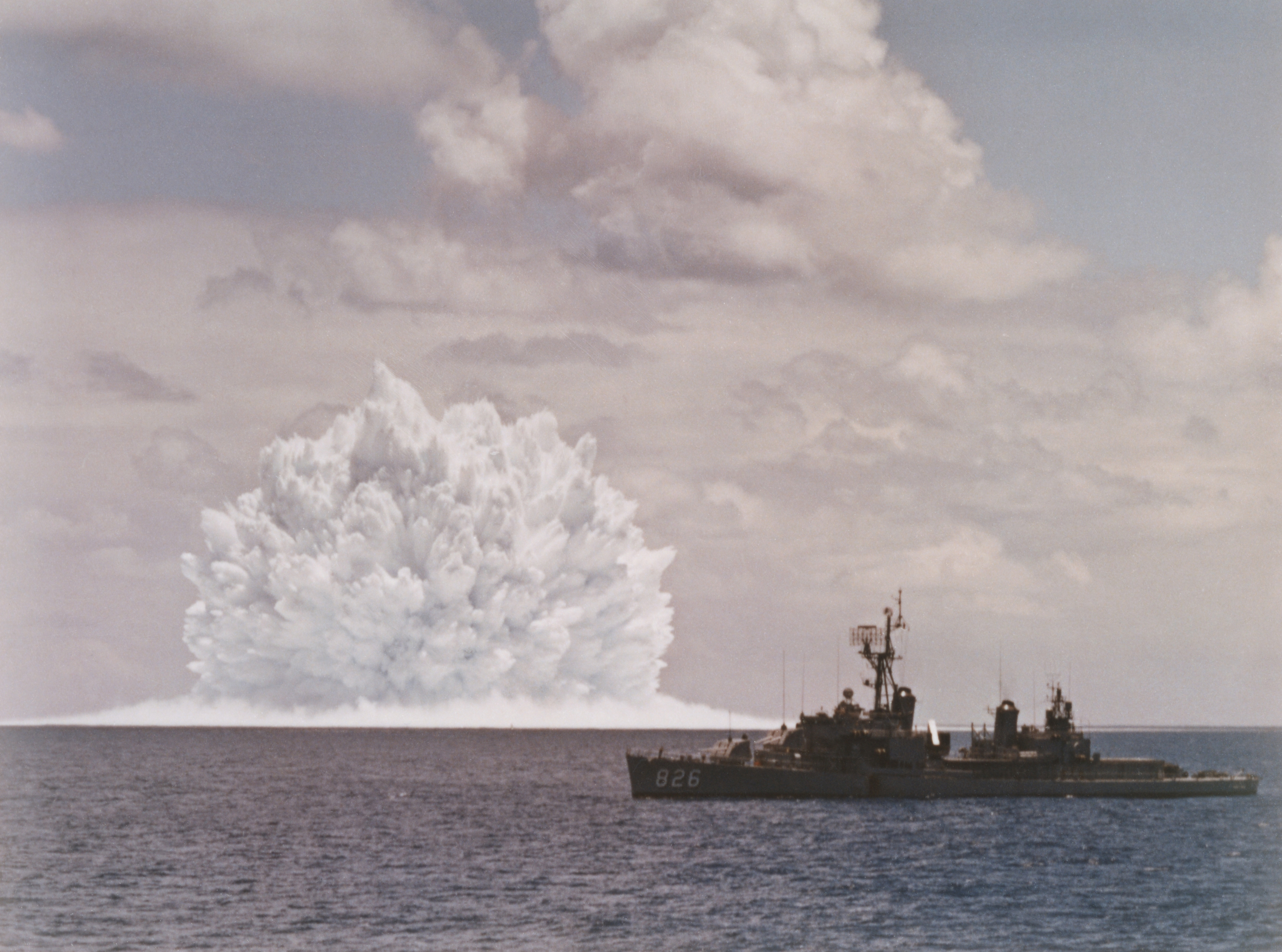
The destroyer USS Agerholm fires an ASROC with a nuclear depth bomb in shot Dominic Swordfish (1962)

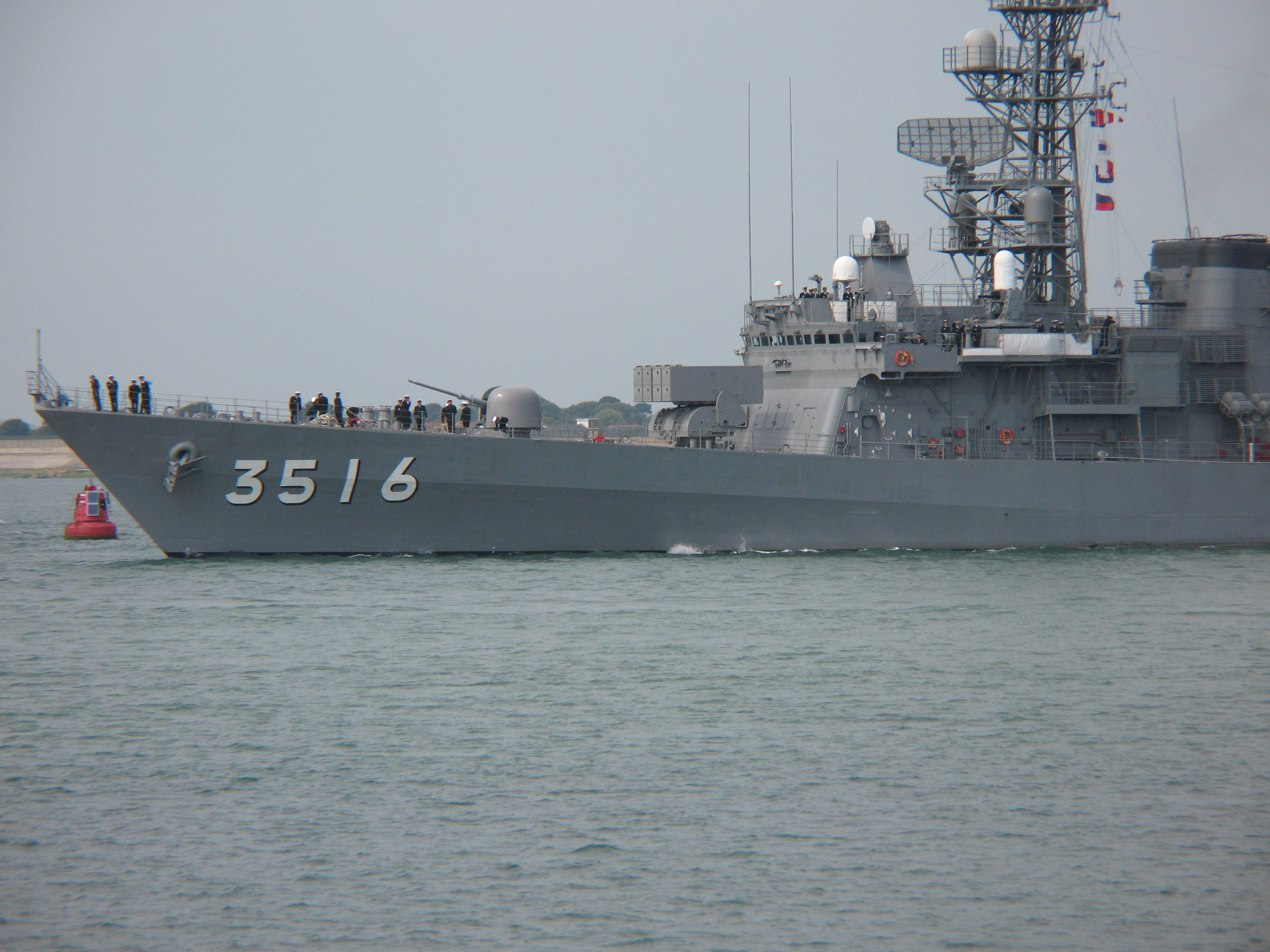
ASROC 'Matchbox' reload doors are visible in this photograph of the Japanese Asagiri-class destroyer, in 2008.

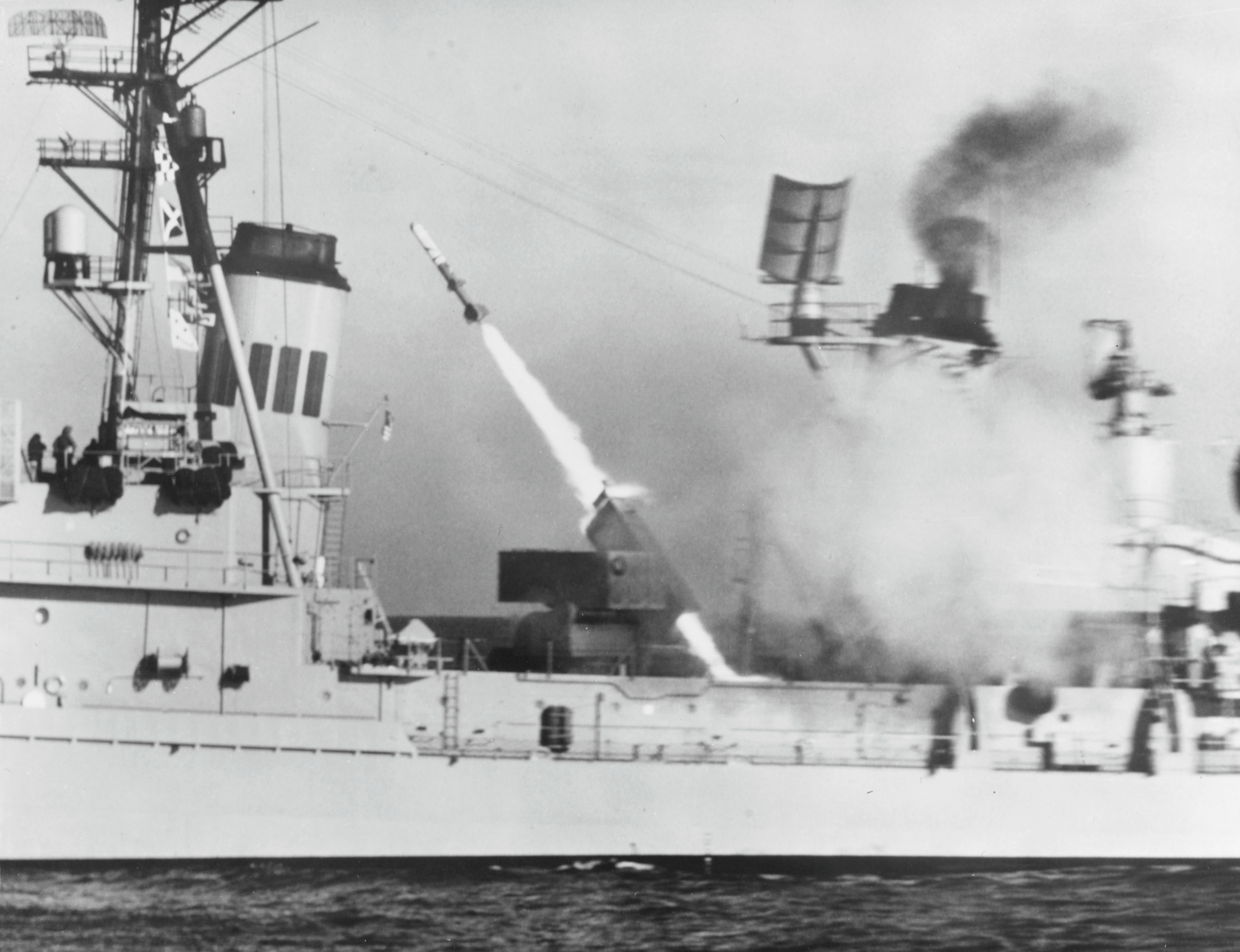
ASROC launch from USS Charles F. Adams, in 1960

The RUR-5 ASROC (for "Anti-Submarine Rocket") is an all-weather, all sea-conditions anti-submarine missile. Developed by the United States Navy in the 1950s, it was deployed in the 1960s, updated in the 1990s, and eventually installed on over 200 USN surface ships, specifically cruisers, destroyers, and frigates. The ASROC has been deployed on scores of warships of many other navies, including Canada, Germany, Italy, Japan, Taiwan, Greece, Pakistan and others.

== History ==
ASROC started development as the Rocket Assisted Torpedo (RAT) program by Naval Air Weapons Station China Lake in the early 1950s to develop a surface warship anti-submarine warfare (ASW) weapon to counter the new post-World War II submarines which ran quieter, at much higher speed and could attack from much longer range with high speed homing torpedoes. In addition, the goal was to take advantage of modern sonars with a much larger detection range. An extended range torpedo delivered by parachute from the air would allow warships the stand-off capability to attack hostile submarines with very little advance notice to the hostile submarine.

The RAT program came in three phases: RAT-A, RAT-B and RAT-C. RAT-A and its follow-on, RAT-B, were compact and economical stand-off weapons for smaller warships, but were determined to be either unreliable or had too short a range. RAT-C was developed as a stand-off ASW weapon that used a nuclear depth charge. This required a range of at least 8,000 yards (7,300 m) to escape potential damage from the underwater blast. The RAT-C was considerably larger than the previous RAT program rockets to accommodate the extended range needed and was for larger warships.

After the failure of both the RAT-A and RAT-B programs, RAT-C was redesigned to use not only a nuclear depth charge but also a homing ASW torpedo. To obtain the accuracy needed, the RAT-C rocket booster had to be redesigned with larger side fins. This program finally combined reliability and accuracy, along with the required stand-off range. Before RAT-C reached operational status in 1960, aboard the large US Navy destroyer leader USS Norfolk, its name was changed to ASROC. ASROC was deployed in 1961 and eventually made the majority of USN surface combatants nuclear-capable.

== Description ==
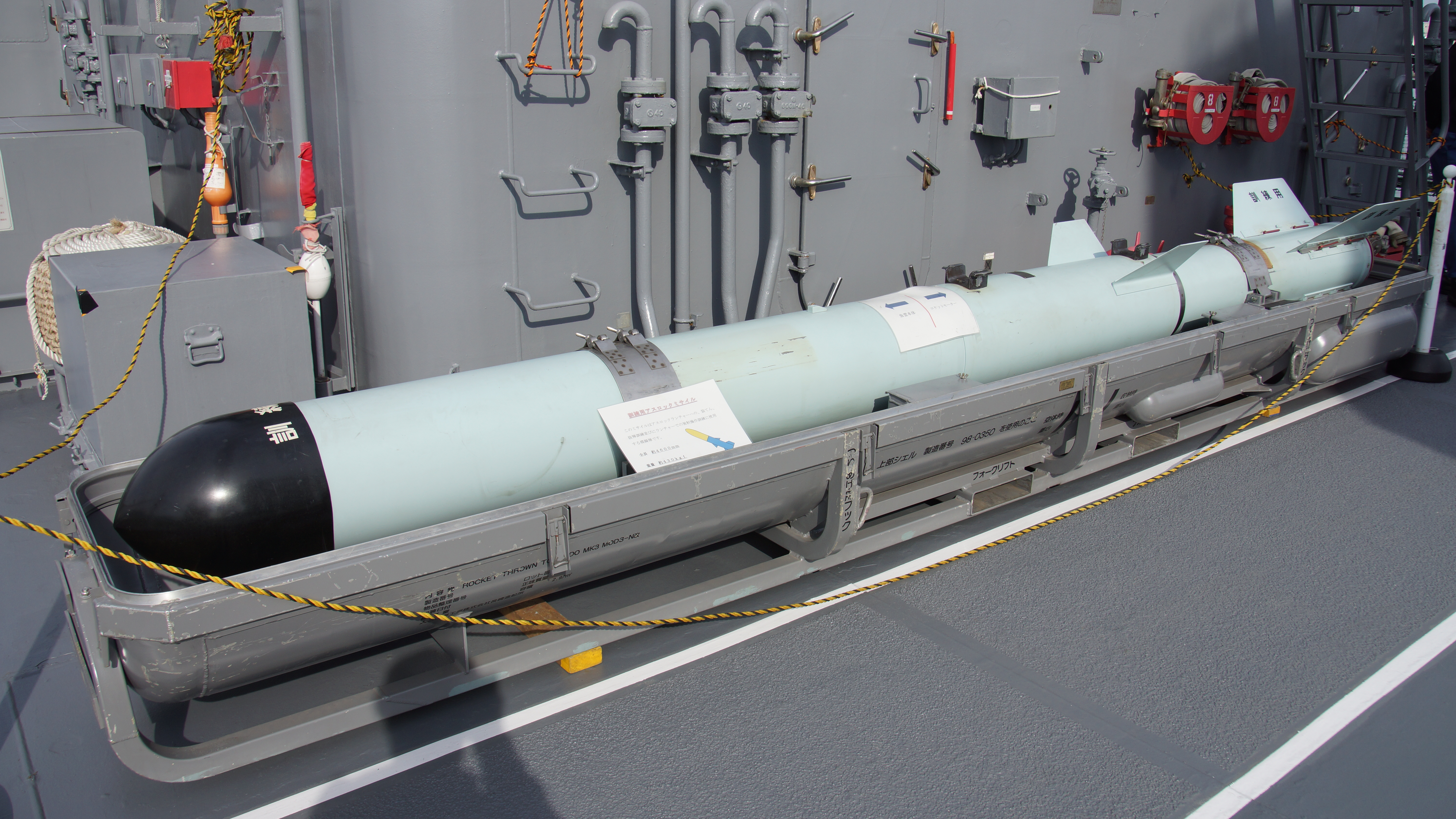
Dummy ASROC round

The first ASROC system using the MK-112 "Matchbox" launcher was developed in the 1950s and installed in the 1960s. This system was phased out in the 1990s and replaced with the RUM-139 Vertical Launch ASROC, or "VLA".

After a surface ship, patrol plane or anti-submarine helicopter detects an enemy submarine by using sonar or other sensors, it could relay the sub's position to an ASROC-equipped ship for attack. The attacking ship would then fire an ASROC missile carrying an acoustic homing torpedo or a W44 nuclear depth bomb onto an unguided ballistic trajectory toward the target. At a pre-determined point on the missile's trajectory, the payload separates from the missile and deploys a parachute to permit splashdown and water entry at a low speed and with minimum detectable noise. Water entry activates the torpedo, which is guided by its own sonar system, and homes in on the target using either active sonar or passive sonar.

=== W44 nuclear depth charge ===
The W44 nuclear depth charge entered service in 1961, but was never used beyond one or two tests before the Limited Nuclear Test Ban Treaty banning underwater nuclear tests went into effect. A total of 575 weapons were produced. The W44 weighed 77 kg (170 lb) with a diameter of 35 cm (13.75 in) and length of 64 cm (25.3 in). Following payload separation, the unguided W44 sank quickly to a predetermined depth where the 10-kiloton warhead detonated. The nuclear-armed ASROC was never used in combat. W44-armed ASROC missiles were retired by 1989, when all types of nuclear depth bombs were removed from deployment.

== Specific installations ==
One of the first ASROC installations was on USS Norfolk (DL-1) in 1960. The first large group of ships to receive ASROC were 78 Gearing-class destroyers, modified under the Fleet Rehabilitation and Modernization Mark I program (FRAM I) in the early 1960s. A Mark 112 8-tube ASROC launcher was added along with other major modifications. ASROC reloads were stowed alongside the helicopter hangar and handled by a small crane.

The 31 U.S. Navy Spruance-class destroyers were all built with the Mark 16 Mod 7 ASROC Launching Group and MK 4 ASROC Weapons Handling System (AWHS) reload system. These had one standard Mark 112 octuple ASROC launcher, located immediately above a reload system holding an additional 16 assembled rounds (two complete reloads of eight missiles apiece). Thus, each Spruance-class destroyer originally carried a maximum total of 24 ASROC.

Most other US Navy and allied navy destroyers, destroyer escorts, frigates, and several different classes of cruisers only carried the one ASROC "matchbox" MK 112 launcher with eight ASROC missiles (although later in service, some of those missiles could be replaced by the Harpoon anti-ship missile). The "matchbox" Mk 112 launchers were capable of carrying a mixture of the two types. Reloads were carried in many classes, either on first level of the superstructure immediately abaft the launcher, or in a separate deckhouse just forward or abaft the Mk 112.

The MK 16 Launching Group also had configurations that supported RGM-84 Harpoon (onboard Knox-class destroyer escorts (frigates)) or a variation of the Tartar missile in limited distribution.

Ships with the Mk 26 GMLS, and late marks of the Mk 10 GMLS aboard the Belknap-class cruisers, could accommodate ASROC in these power-loaded launchers (the Mk 13 GMLS was not able to fire the weapon, as the launcher rail was too short).

Most Spruance-class destroyers were later modified to include the Mk 41 VLS, these launchers are capable of carrying a mixture of the RUM-139 VL-ASROC, the Tomahawk TLAM, and other missiles. All of the Spruance destroyers carried two separate quad Harpoon launchers. Other US ships with the Mk 41 can also accommodate VL-ASROC.

== Operators ==
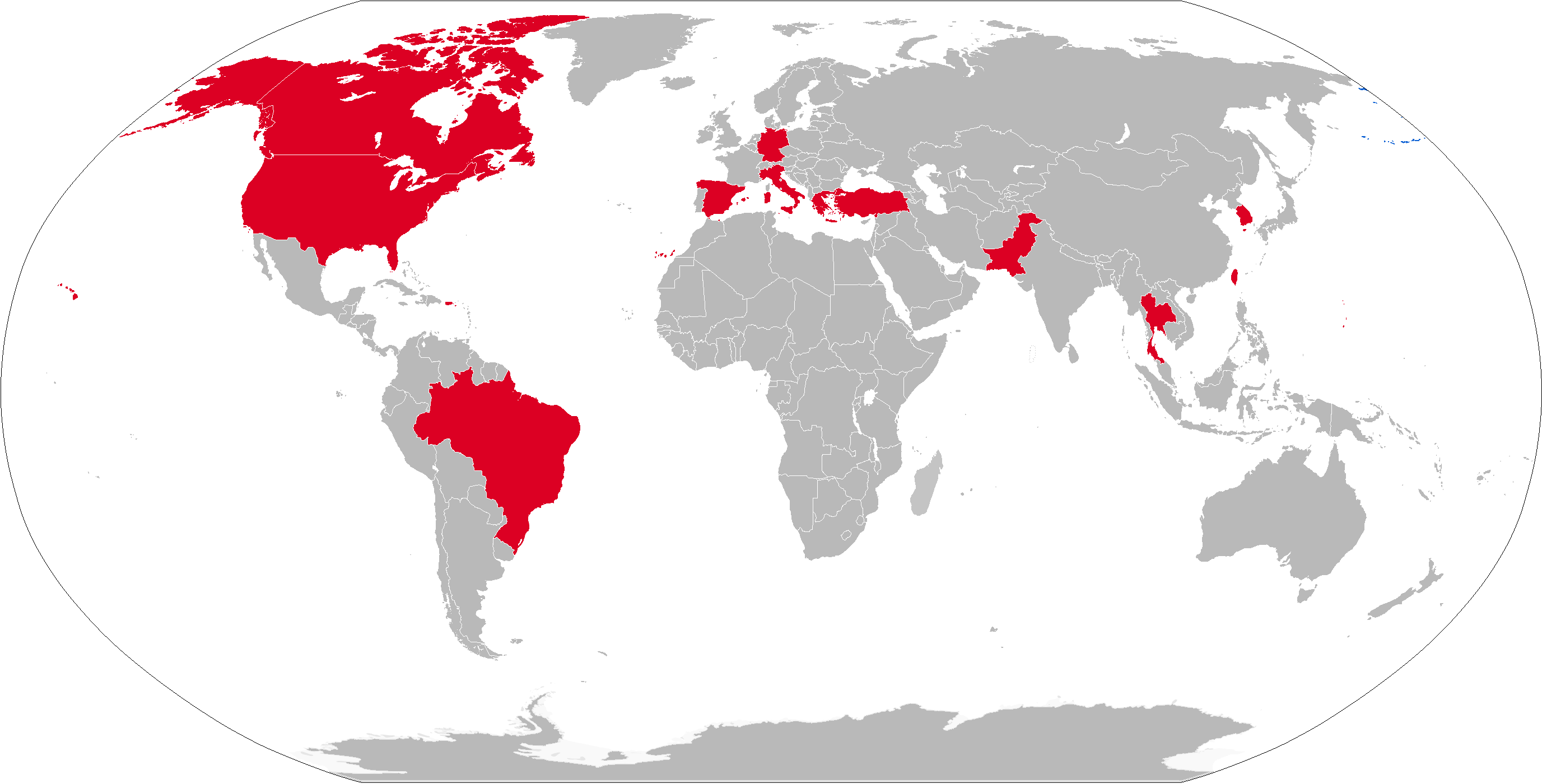
Map with former RUR-5 operators in red

Japan Maritime Self-Defense Force
Republic of China Navy

=== Former operators ===
Brazilian Navy
Royal Canadian Navy
- only on Restigouche-class destroyers (after IRE/DELEX modification.)
German Navy
- only on Lütjens-class destroyers
Hellenic Navy
Italian Navy
- only on Vittorio Veneto using a Mk 10 GMLS launcher (depot for 40 missiles, between RIM-2 Terrier / RIM-67A SM-1ER and ASROC)
Mexican Navy
Republic of Korea Navy
Pakistan Navy
Spanish Navy
Royal Thai Navy
Turkish Navy
United States Navy

== See also ==
- Ikara – (Australia)
- Hong Sang Eo – (South Korea)
- Malafon – (France)
- MILAS – (Italy, France)
- RUM-139 VL-ASROC – (United States)
- Sea Lance – (United States)
- SUBROC – (United States)
- Terasca – (United States)
- List of nuclear weapons
- Nuclear weapon design
- SUW-N-1 – (Soviet Union)
