= Soviet helicopter carrier Leningrad =

Helicopter carrier of the Soviet Navy

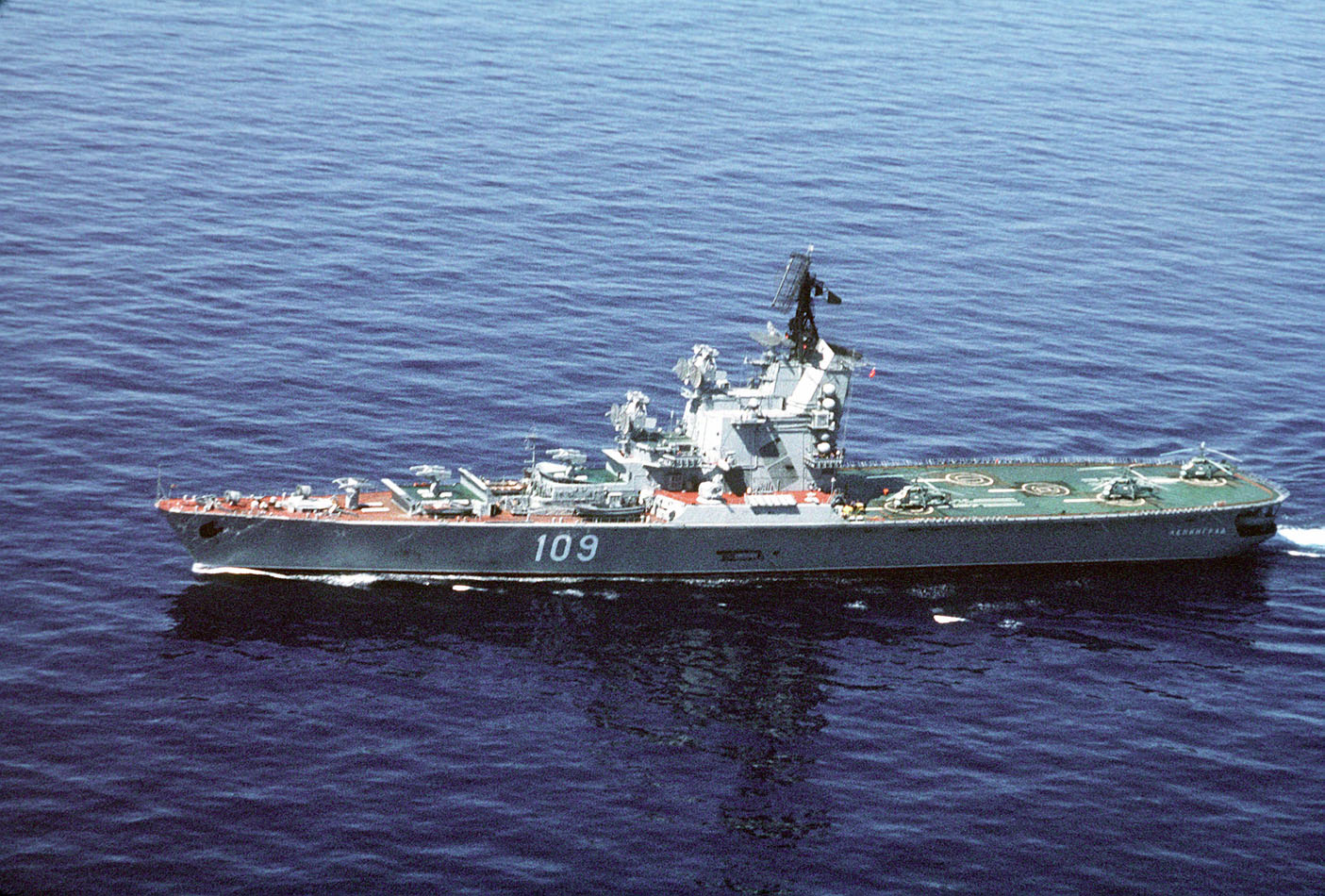
- Leningrad underway in 1990

History

Soviet Union
- Name: Leningrad
- Namesake: Leningrad
- Builder: Nikolayev South (Shipyard No.444)
- Laid down: 15 January 1965
- Launched: 31 July 1966
- Commissioned: 2 June 1969
- Decommissioned: 24 June 1991
- Fate: Scrapped 1995

General characteristics
- Class & type: Moskva-class helicopter carrier
- Displacement: 11,920 tons (standard); 15,280 tons (loaded)
- Length: 189.0 m (620 ft 1 in)
- Beam: 34.0 m (111 ft 7 in)
- Draught: 7.7 m (25 ft 3 in)
- Propulsion: 2 shaft steam turbines, 4 pressure fire boilers, 100,000 hp (75,000 kW)
- Speed: 31 knots (57 km/h; 36 mph)
- Range: 14,000 nmi (26,000 km; 16,000 mi) at 12 knots (22 km/h; 14 mph)
- Complement: 850
- Armament: SA-N-3 'Goblet' SAM 2 twin launchers, 2 × twin 57 mm guns, 1 × SUW-N-1 launcher for FRAS-1 anti submarine missiles, 2 × RBU-6000 ASW rockets, 10 × 553 mm torpedo tubes (2 × 5)
- Aircraft carried: 14 Ka-27 'Helix' helicopters

Leningrad was the second of two Moskva-class helicopter carriers in service with the Soviet Navy. Laid down at Nikolayev South (Shipyard No.444), Leningrad was commissioned in late 1968. Preceded by Moskva, there were no further vessels built, reportedly due to the poor handling of the ships in rough seas. She was conventionally powered.

== Design ==
The Moskvas were not true "aircraft carriers" in that they did not carry any fixed-wing aircraft; the air wing was composed entirely of helicopters. They were designed primarily as anti-submarine warfare (ASW) vessels, and her weapons and sensor suite was optimized against the nuclear submarine threat. Shipboard ASW armament included a twin SUW-N-1 launcher capable of delivering a FRAS-1 projectile carrying a 450 mm torpedo (or a 5 kiloton nuclear warhead); a pair of RBU-6000 ASW mortars; and a set of torpedo tubes. For self-defense, the Moskvas had two twin SA-N-3 SAM launchers with reloads for a total of 48 surface-to-air missiles, along with two twin 57 mm/80 guns. A "Mare Tail" variable depth sonar worked in conjunction with heliborne sensors to hunt submarines.

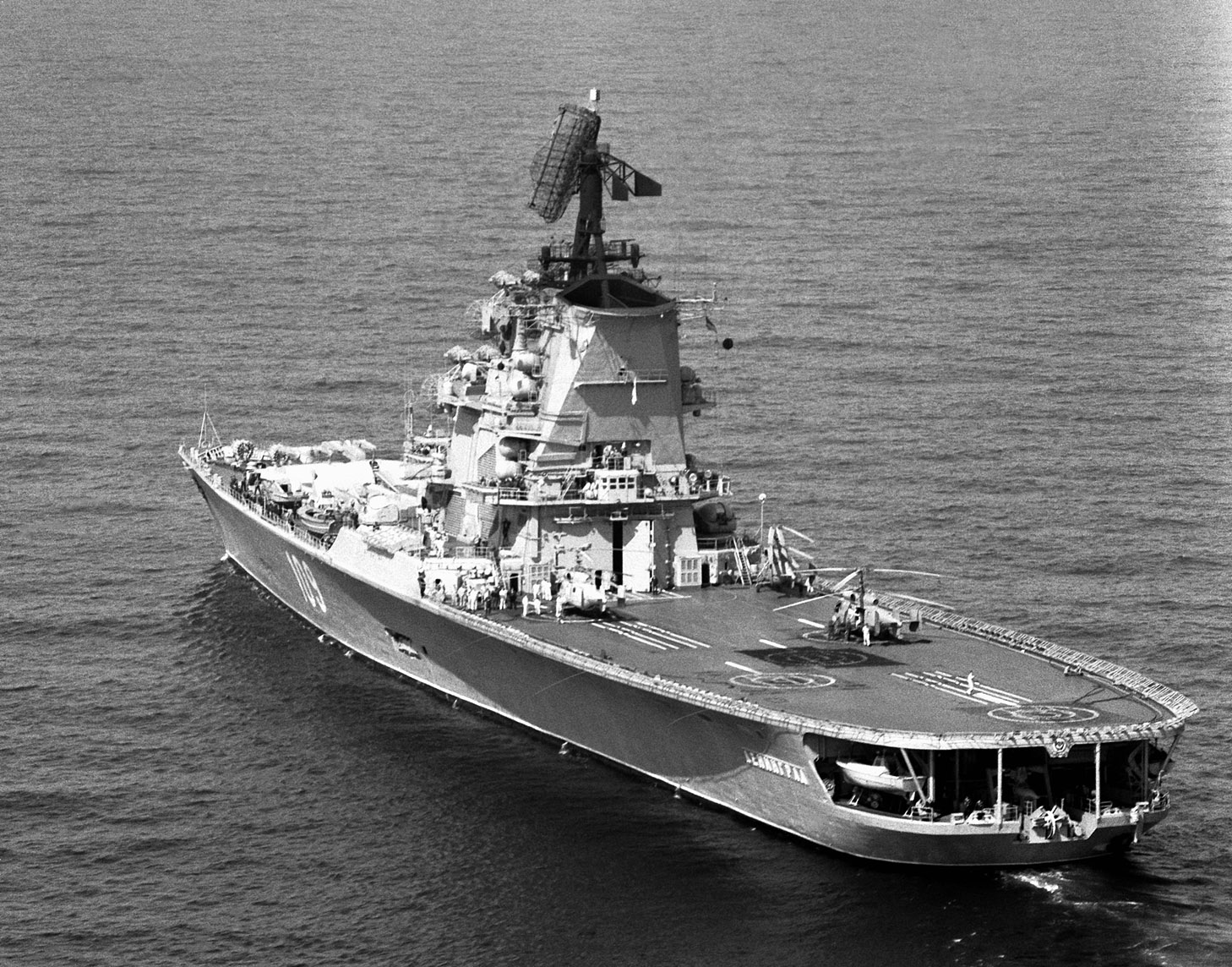
A port-quarter fantail view of Leningrad

Their strategic role was to defend the Soviet ballistic missile submarine bastions against incursions by Western attack submarines, forming the flagships of an ASW task force.

== Construction and service ==
Leningrad was laid down at the Black Sea Shipyard in Nikolayev with yard number 702 on 15 January 1965, launched on 31 July 1966, added to the list of ships of the Soviet Navy on 24 January 1967, and entered service on 2 June 1969. She became part of the Black Sea Fleet on 9 July of that year. Between 1 and 31 May 1970, 1 December 1971 and 30 June 1972, and 15 June and 6 December 1974 she cruised in the Mediterranean Sea to support Egyptian forces. Between 4 August and 14 October 1974 she was the flagship for the detachment of ships in the Suez Canal mine clearance operation. Between August and November 1984 she participated in minesweeping operations in the Red Sea, the Bab-el-Mandeb, and the Gulf of Aden. Between 31 May and 7 June 1990 she participated in short anti-submarine search exercises in the Mediterranean.

Leningrad participated in the rescue operations for the Soviet submarine K-19 in the North Atlantic between February and March 1972. In honor of the 50th anniversary of the founding of the Soviet Union, the helicopter carrier was awarded an honorary jubilee badge by the Central Committee of the Communist Party of the Soviet Union and the Presidium of the Supreme Soviet. She made visits to Dakar between 19 and 23 November 1974, Split between 14 and 19 October 1976, Algiers between 27 September and 1 October 1981, and Havana between 26 and 30 March 1984. Between 12 May 1977 and 6 October 1978 and from 3 February 1986 to 11 December 1987 she was refitted at Sevmorzavod.

With a hunting group, she was awarded the 1989 prize of the Commander-in-Chief of the Soviet Navy in the anti-aircraft category. On 24 June 1991 the helicopter carrier was removed from the navy after being transferred for disarmament and scrapping. On 5 December the crew was disbanded and on 24 August 1995 she was towed from Sevastopol to India for scrapping.
