= M-11 Shtorm =

Soviet Medium Range naval SAM system

M-11 Shtorm / SA-N-3 Goblet
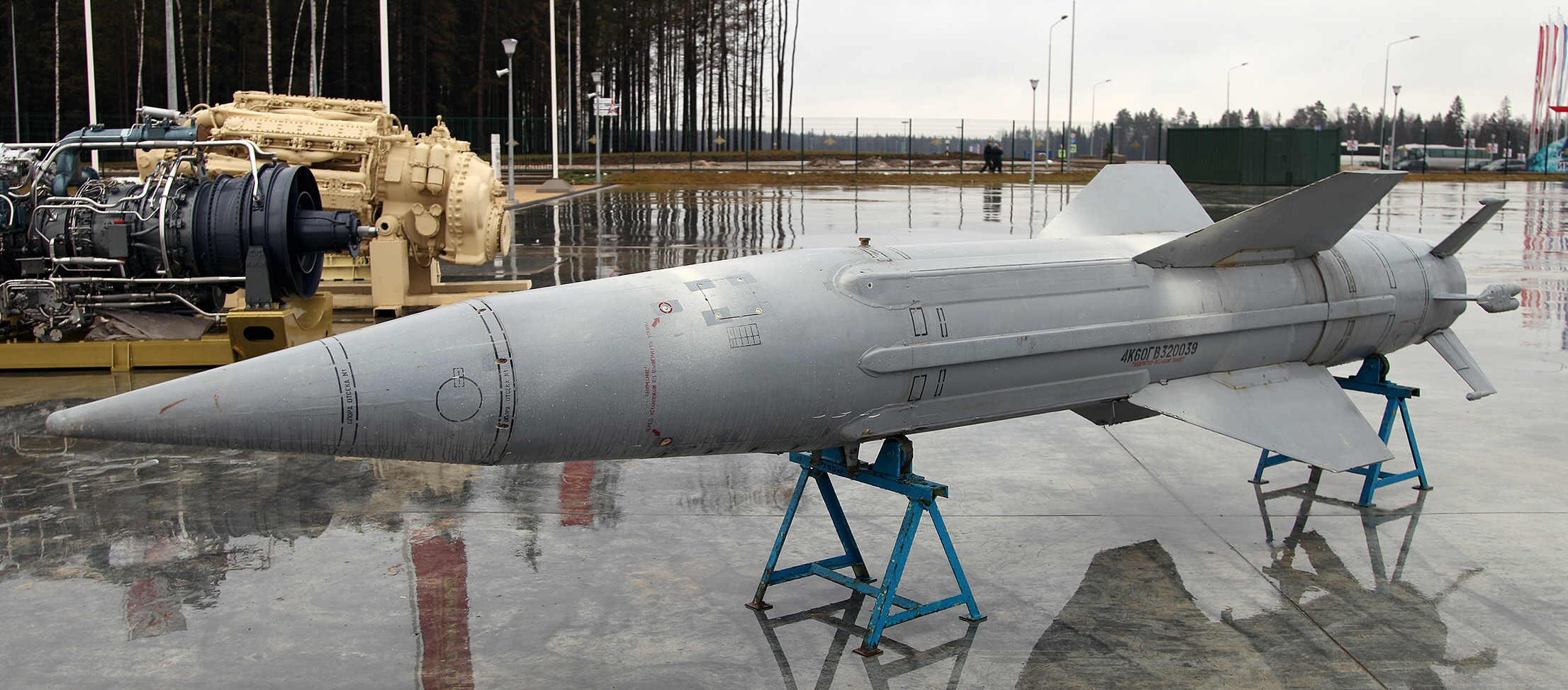
- 4K60 at the Army-2015 exhibition
- Type: Naval Medium Range SAM system
- Place of origin: Soviet Union

Service history
- In service: 1969–present

Production history
- Designer: Scientific Research Institute 10 (NII-10)
- Designed: 1959–1966

Specifications (V-611 "Shtorm")
- Mass: 1,844 kg (4,065 lb)
- Length: 610 cm (240 in)
- Warhead weight: 80 kg (180 lb)
- Operational range: 30 km (19 mi)
- Flight altitude: 25,000 m (82,000 ft)
- Maximum speed: Mach 3
- Launch platform: Twin rail, Naval Mount with below deck magazine.

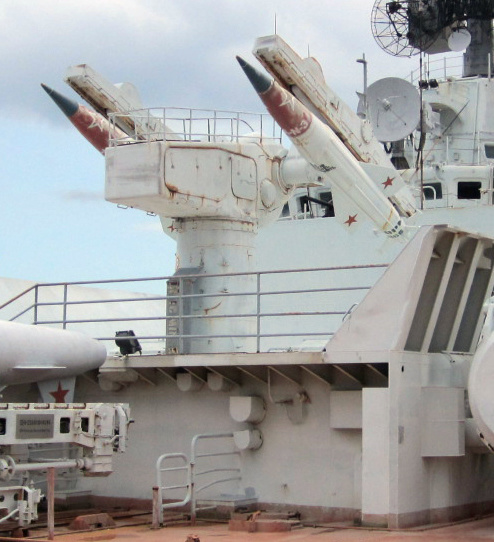
M-11 Shtorm launcher with replica missiles, on display at Minsk World

The M-11 Shtorm (Russian: М-11 «Шторм»; English: Storm) is a Soviet naval surface-to-air missile system. Its GRAU designation is 4K60. Its NATO reporting name is SA-N-3 Goblet. The system was first installed on Moskva, an anti-submarine warfare carrier, which was commissioned in 1967, but the system was not officially accepted into service until 1969. Unusually for such systems, it has no land-based counterpart. It was only deployed on Russian vessels, and was never used in combat.

== Development ==
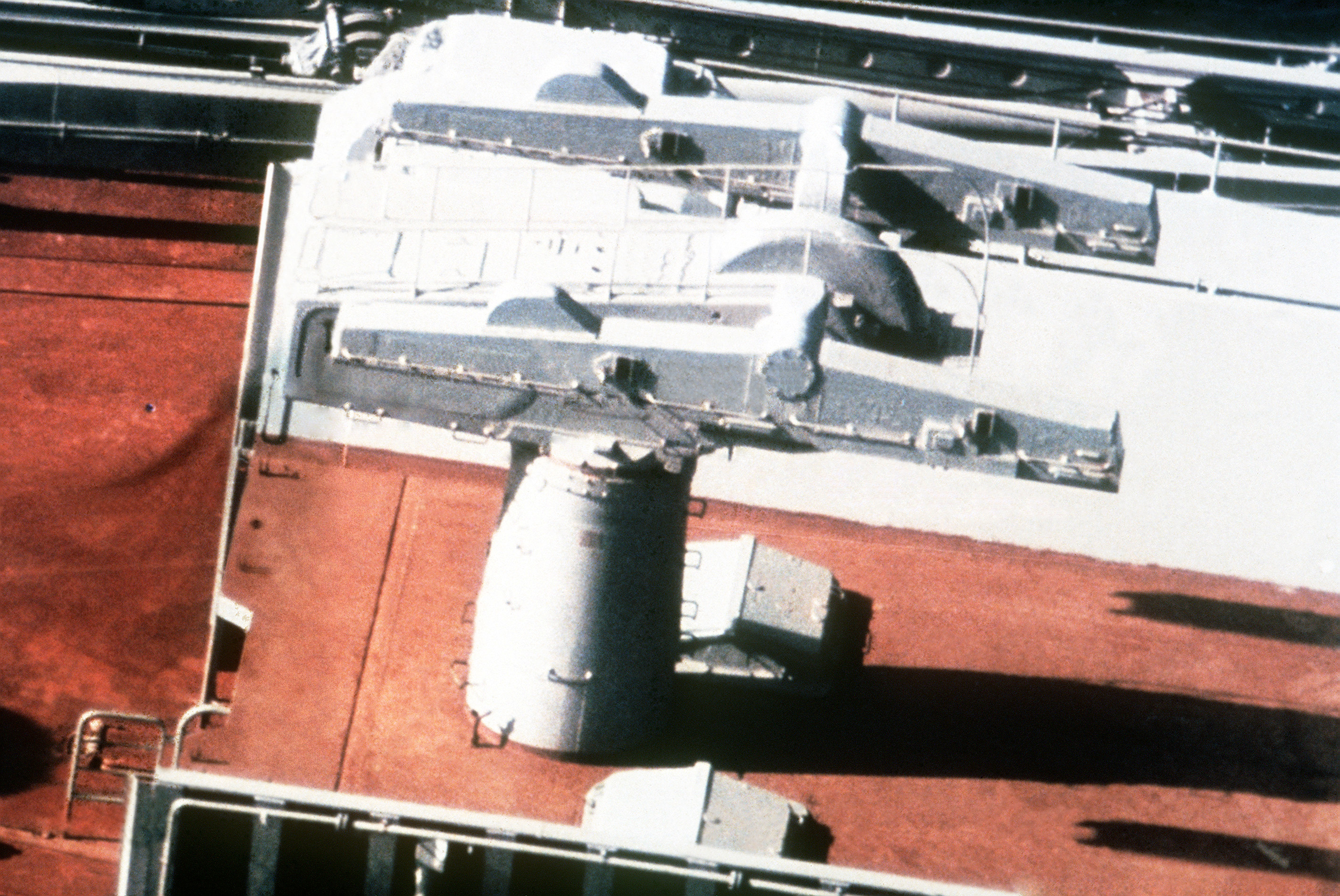
M-11 Shtorm launcher on the aircraft carrier Kiev.

Development of the M-11 Storm system was first authorised on 25 July 1959. Work was carried out by Scientific Research Institute 10 (NII-10) that was also working on the M-1 Volna system. It was originally intended to be installed on the Project 1126 warship, but both the ship and missile system were canceled in June 1961. However, the missile project was re-activated only a month later for installation in the Project 1123 Moskva-class helicopter carrier. The design was completed in April 1962, and included a modified version of the ZIF-101 launcher, that was used with the M-1 missile system. The launcher design proved to be impractical, the resulting redesign delayed production of prototypes until 1964.

Between 1964 and 1966 sea trials were conducted on the missile testbed OS-24 which had previously been the heavy cruiser Voroshilov. The system was installed on Moskva, which was commissioned on 25 December 1967, but development continued until 1969 when it was officially accepted into service.

== Description ==
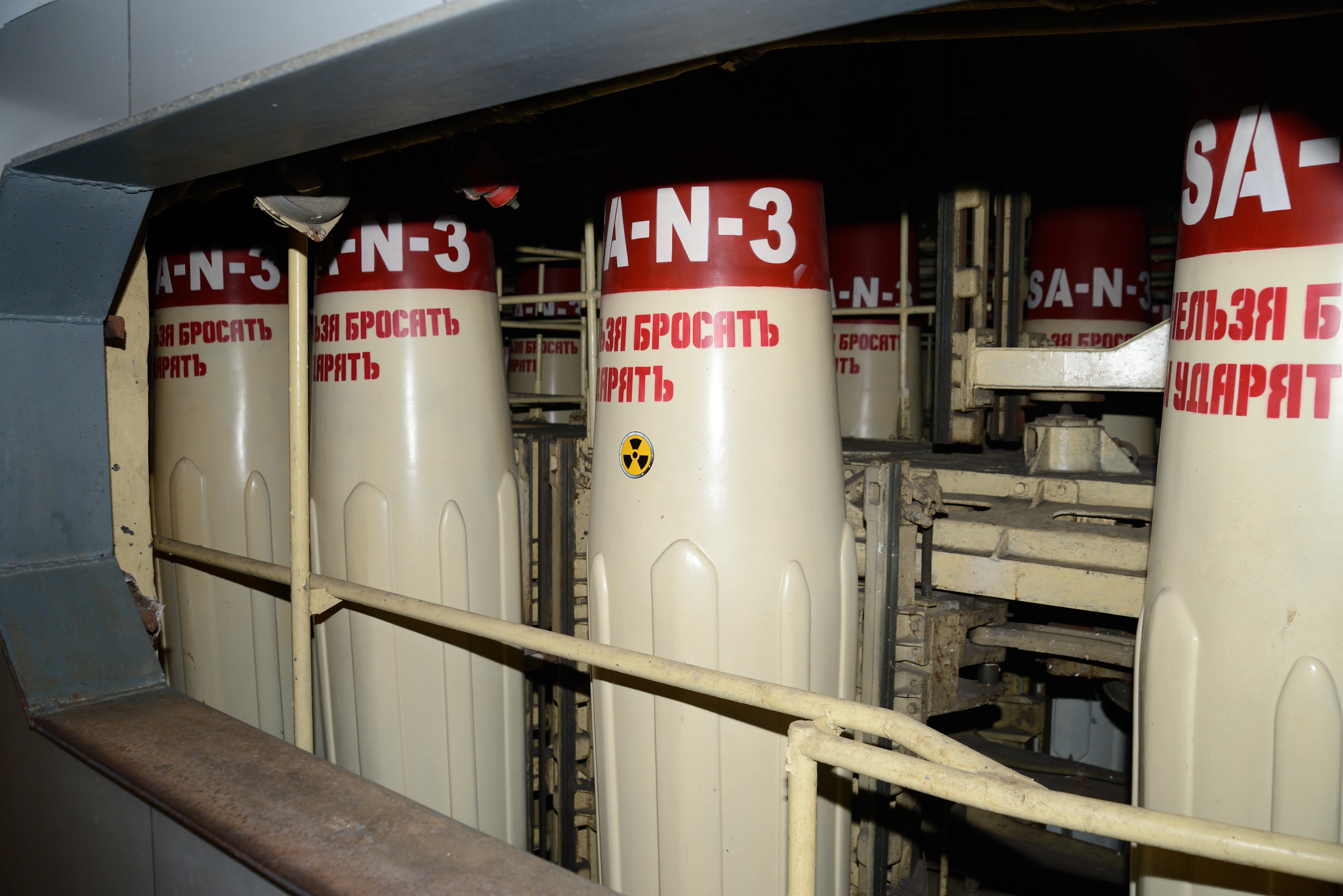
Replica 4K60 Shtorm missiles on the aircraft carrier Minsk. Inscriptions on missiles were added by Minsk World theme park staff

The 4K60/41K65 missiles are carried in pairs on rotating twin rail launchers and fly at between Mach 2 and 3. They are 610 cm (20.0 ft) long, weigh 1,844 kg (4,065 lb) each with an 80 kg (180 lb) warheads. The effective altitude is around 100–25,000 m (330–82,020 ft) and the earlier missiles have an engagement range of 3–30 km (1.9–18.6 mi) while the 41K65 extends the maximum range to 55 km (34 mi). Guidance is via radio command.

The radar associated with the M-11 is known in the west as "Head Lights", often found in conjunction with a "Top Sail" search radar.

The initial version of this system, the 4K60 M-11 "Shtorm" with V611 missiles is known to the US DoD as the SA-N-3A. The upgraded version is the 4K65 "Shtorm-M" with V611M missiles and is designated the SA-N-3B.

== Variants ==
- 4K60 Shtorm V611 (SA-N-3A) - Initial version
- 4K65 Shtorm-M V611M (SA-N-3B) - Improved version

== Installations ==
A total of 25 systems were produced and installed on the following classes of ships:

- Moskva-class helicopter carriers (1967–1991) – two twin B-189 launchers, each fed from twin six-round drum magazines, for a total of 48 missiles.
- Kresta II-class guided missile cruisers (1968–1993) – two twin launchers. 72 missiles total.
- Kara-class guided missile cruisers (1969–2014, one in reserve until April 2020) – two B-189 twin launchers, each fed from twin six-round drum magazines, 80 missiles total.
- Kiev-class aircraft carriers (first launched 1970, last sold to India 2004) – two twin launchers.

== Former operators ==
- Soviet Union
- Russia

== See also ==
- Mark 11 missile launcher
