= Soviet aircraft carrier Novorossiysk =

1978 Kiev-class aircraft carrier

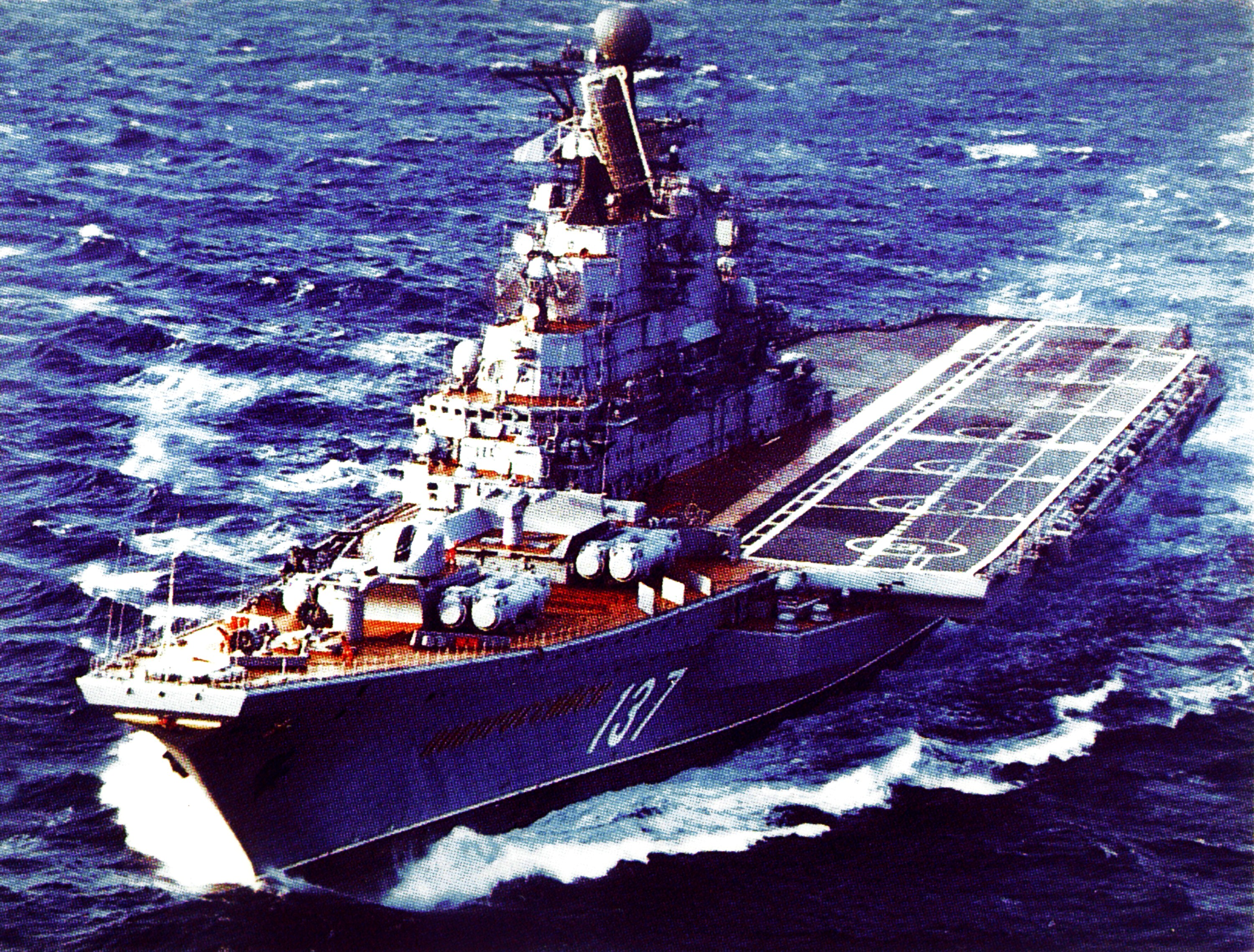
- Novorossiysk in 1986

History

Russia
- Name: Novorossiysk
- Namesake: City of Novorossiysk
- Builder: Chernomorskiy yard, Nikolayev
- Laid down: 30 September 1975
- Launched: 26 December 1978
- Commissioned: 14 September 1982
- Decommissioned: 30 June 1993
- Fate: Scrapped 1997

General characteristics
- Class & type: Kiev-class aircraft cruiser
- Displacement: 31,900 tons (standard); 43,220 tons (loaded)
- Length: 273.1 m (896 ft) overall
- Beam: 51.3 m (168 ft) o/a; 31 m (102 ft) w/l
- Draught: 9.3 m (31 ft)
- Propulsion: 4 shaft geared steam turbines, 140,000 shp
- Speed: 32 knots (59 km/h)
- Endurance: 13,500 nautical miles (25,000 km) at 18 knots (33 km/h)
- Armament: 4 × twin SS-N-12 Sandbox SSM launchers (8 missiles), 2 × twin SA-N-3 Goblet SAM launchers (72 missiles), 2 × twin 76.2 mm AA guns, 8 × AK-630 30 mm CIWS, 1 × twin SUW-N-1 FRAS Anti-Submarine Rocket launcher
- Aircraft carried: 12 Yak-38M fighter aircraft; 20 Kamov Ka-25 or Kamov Ka-27 helicopters

Novorossiysk (Russian: Новороссийск) was a conventionally powered aircraft carrier (heavy aircraft cruiser in Russian classification) that served the Soviet Navy and the Russian Navy from 1982 to 1993. She was the third Kiev-class vessel to be built. She was designed to engage in offensive actions as a guided missile cruiser mostly using her deck mounted missiles as well as support anti-submarine and surface actions with her embarked air group.

== History ==
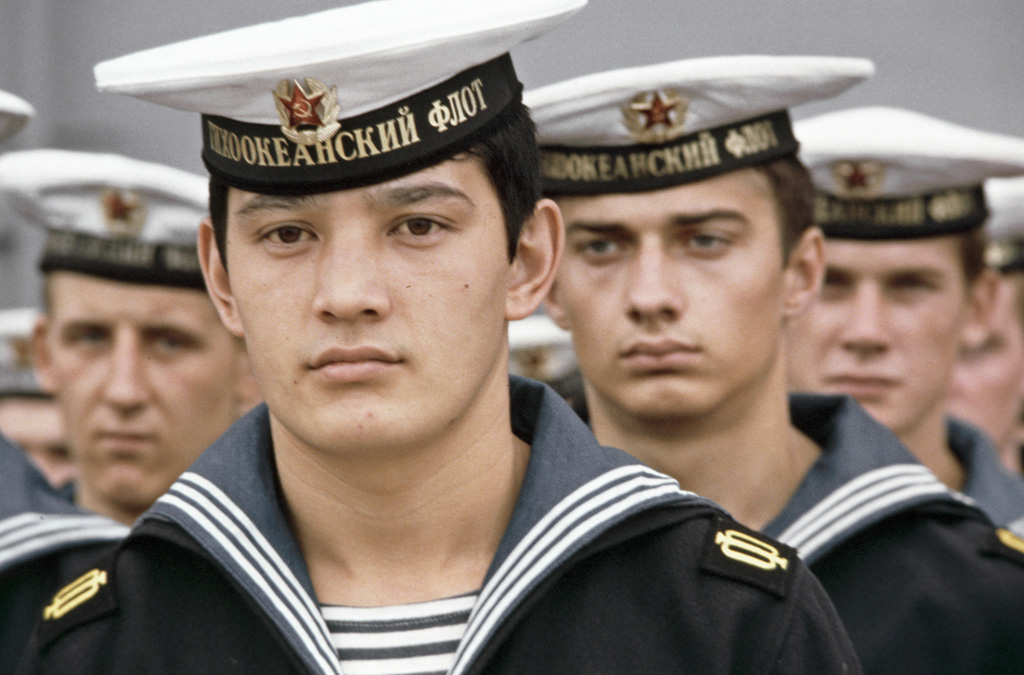
Sailors of the aircraft carrier Novorossiisk, Red Banner Pacific Fleet (1984)

Novorossiysk was laid down at the Soviet Black Sea Shipyard in Nikolayev, Ukrainian SSR, on 30 September 1975, launched on 24 December 1978, commissioned on 12 September 1982, and decommissioned in June 1993. The third ship in her class, she served in the Soviet Pacific Fleet.

In March 1985, Novorossiysk and escorting battle group departed the Sea of Japan, sailed to the south of Okinawa and then east across the Pacific. After approximately eight days, the ships turned and headed northwest toward the Kuril Islands, simulating an enemy carrier strike against the Soviet Union. As the Novorossiysk approached the islands, about 700 miles (1,100 km) east of Japan, Soviet Bear bombers flew reconnaissance missions near the battle group and helped vector some 20 Backfire bombers to their targets, practicing the Soviet strategy of bomber launched anti-ship missile warfare. A U.S. Navy description of the Novorossisysk exercise notes that "The force was hit by simulated air strikes and probably by submarines firing torpedoes and cruise missiles from 1,120 km east of Japan, on 14 April. They came at it with submarines and aircraft--everything they had." The Novorossiysk made its last voyage in mid-1991 just before the break-up of the Soviet Union.

In 1995 the Novorossiysk hulk, which had suffered a serious engine room fire two years earlier, was sold for scrapping, and was broken up in 1997 at Pohang, South Korea.

== See also ==
- Soviet battleship Novorossiysk (1949–1955), former Italian battleship Giulio Cesare
- List of aircraft carriers of Russia and the Soviet Union
