= Kiev-class aircraft carrier =

Class of aircraft carriers built for the Soviet Navy

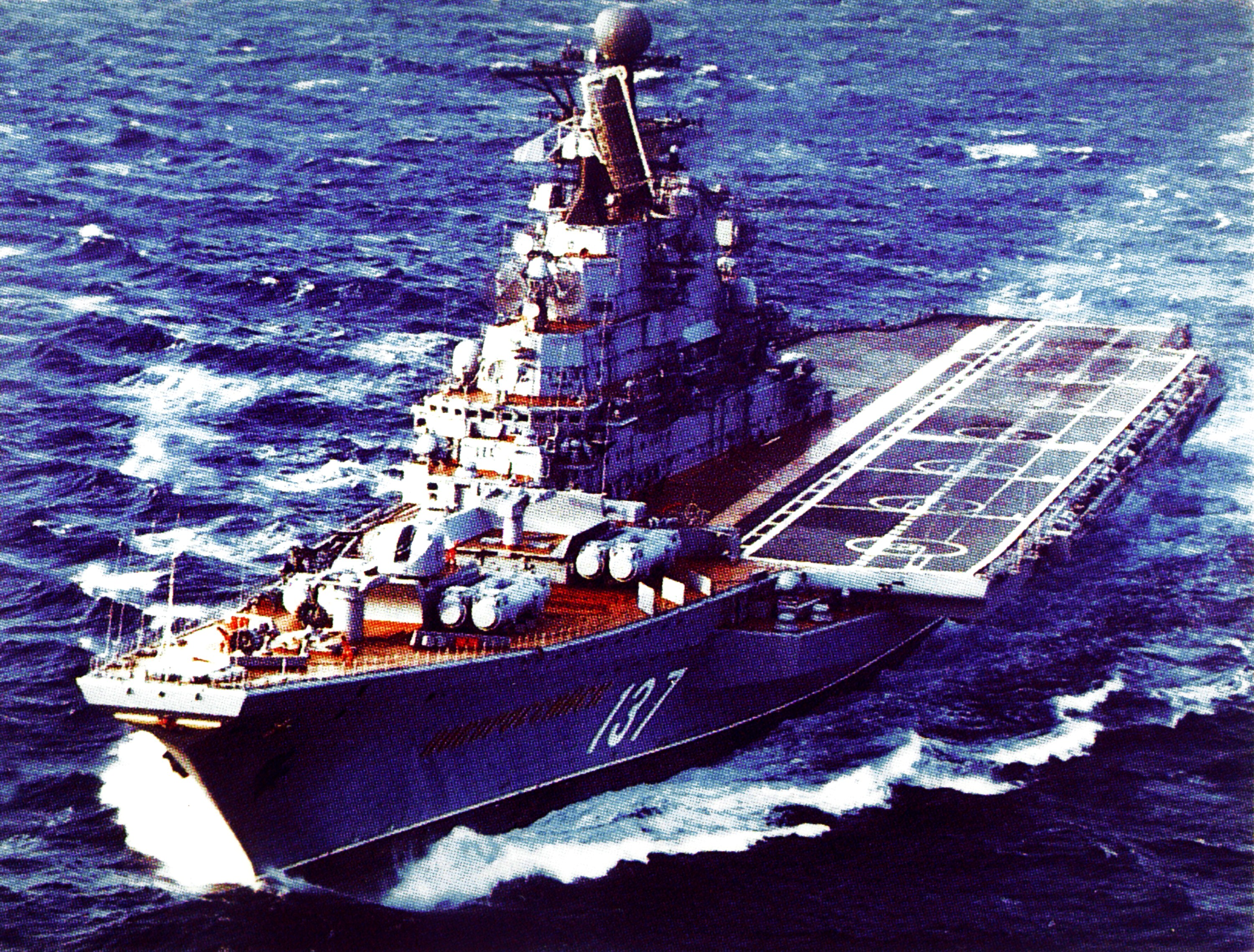
- Novorossiysk in 1986

Class overview
- Name: Kiev class
- Builders: Chernomorsky Shipyard 444
- Operators: Soviet Navy; Russian Navy; Indian Navy
- Preceded by: Moskva class
- Succeeded by: Kuznetsov class (Russian Navy); Vikrant class (Indian Navy)
- Subclasses: Baku class
- Built: 1970–1987
- In service: 1975–1996; 2013–present
- Completed: 4
- Active: 1
- Preserved: 2

General characteristics
- Type: Aircraft cruiser/Aircraft carrier
- Displacement: 42,000–45,000 tons full load
- Length: 273 m (895 ft 8 in)
- Beam: 53 m (173 ft 11 in) o/a; 31 m (101 ft 8 in) w/l
- Draught: 10 m (32 ft 10 in)
- Propulsion: 8 turbopressurized boilers, 4 steam turbines (200,000 shp (150,000 kW)), four shafts
- Speed: 32 knots (59 km/h; 37 mph)
- Complement: 1,200 to 1,600
- Sensors & processing systems: MR-600 'Voskhod' air-search radar; MR-710 'Fregat' air/surface radar; Privod-SV radiolocation system; MG-342 Orion active bow sonar; MGK-355 Platina passive sonar system
- Electronic warfare & decoys: MRP-150 Gurzuf A; MRP-152 Gurzuf B
- Armament: See article for variations; 80 to 200 surface-to-air missiles; 2 dual-purpose guns; 8 close-in weapons systems; 10 torpedo tubes
- Aircraft carried: Up to 30, including: 12 × Yak-38 aircraft; 16 × Ka-25 or Ka-27 helicopters
- Aviation facilities: Abbreviated angled aft flight deck

The Kiev class, Soviet designation Project 1143 Krechyet (gyrfalcon), was the first class of fixed-wing aircraft carriers (heavy aviation cruiser in Soviet classification) built in the Soviet Union for the Soviet Navy. In addition to its aviation capabilities, the Kiev-class incorporated a large armament of anti-ship cruise missiles, surface to air missile systems, and sonar equipment, making it an aircraft cruiser.

The Soviet Union built and commissioned a total of four Kiev-class carriers, which served in the Soviet then Russian navies between 1975 and 1996. Kiev and Minsk were sold to China as museum ships, while Novorossiysk was scrapped. The fourth ship, Baku, was sold to the Indian Navy as Admiral Gorshkov in 2004, and after years of extensive modifications and refurbishment, is in active service as the INS Vikramaditya.

== Development ==
The Kiev-class carriers were designed as a follow-on to the Moskva class (Project 1123 Kondor) ASW carriers. Initially, 3 carriers had been ordered by the Soviet Navy, (with Kiev being the third), however successful flight demonstrations by the Yak-36 VTOL aircraft created a shift in policy within the navy. A delay between the completion of the Project 1123 carrier Leningrad, and the planned Project 1123.3 Kiev led Commander in Chief of the Navy Sergei Gorshkov to suggest a redesign of the Kiev. This new design was designated Project 1143, and was built around a large angled flight deck for the operation of Yak-38 VTOL aircraft. Additional systems were included, such as a heavy anti ship armament, expanded SAM systems, and improved electronics. The final design was designated the Project 1143 Krechyet, with the first ship being the Kiev.

== Design ==
Unlike most NATO aircraft carriers, the Kiev class was a combination of both a cruiser and an aircraft carrier. The ships were designed with a large island superstructure to starboard, with an angled flight-deck two-thirds of the length of the total deck; the foredeck was taken up with heavy surface-to-air and surface-to-surface missile armament. The intended mission of the Kiev class was support for ballistic missile submarines, other surface ships, and naval aviation; it was capable of engaging in anti-aircraft, anti-submarine, and surface warfare. In the Soviet Navy, this class of ships was specifically designated as a "heavy aviation cruiser" (Russian: Тяжелые авианесущие крейсера, TAKR) rather than solely as an aircraft carrier. As a result, they were permitted to transit the Turkish Straits; the 1936 Montreux Convention only prohibited aircraft carriers heavier than 15,000 tons from passing through.

=== Armament ===
The main antiship armament of the Kiev-class consisted of a large P-500 Bazalt (SS-N-12 Sandbox) complex mounted on the foredeck. The P-500 was a large supersonic sea skimming cruise missile with the ability to navigate towards a target at high altitudes. The missile's range of up to 550 kilometres (340 mi) gave the Kiev a significant antiship capability, far beyond that of its aircraft complement. This system included 8 launchers mounted on the foredeck, and associated guidance equipment. The Kiev and Minsk had a large storage bunker and crane for carrying 8 additional missiles, although this bunker was omitted on the Novorossiysk. The Baku was equipped with 12 launchers on the foredeck, and had no reloads.

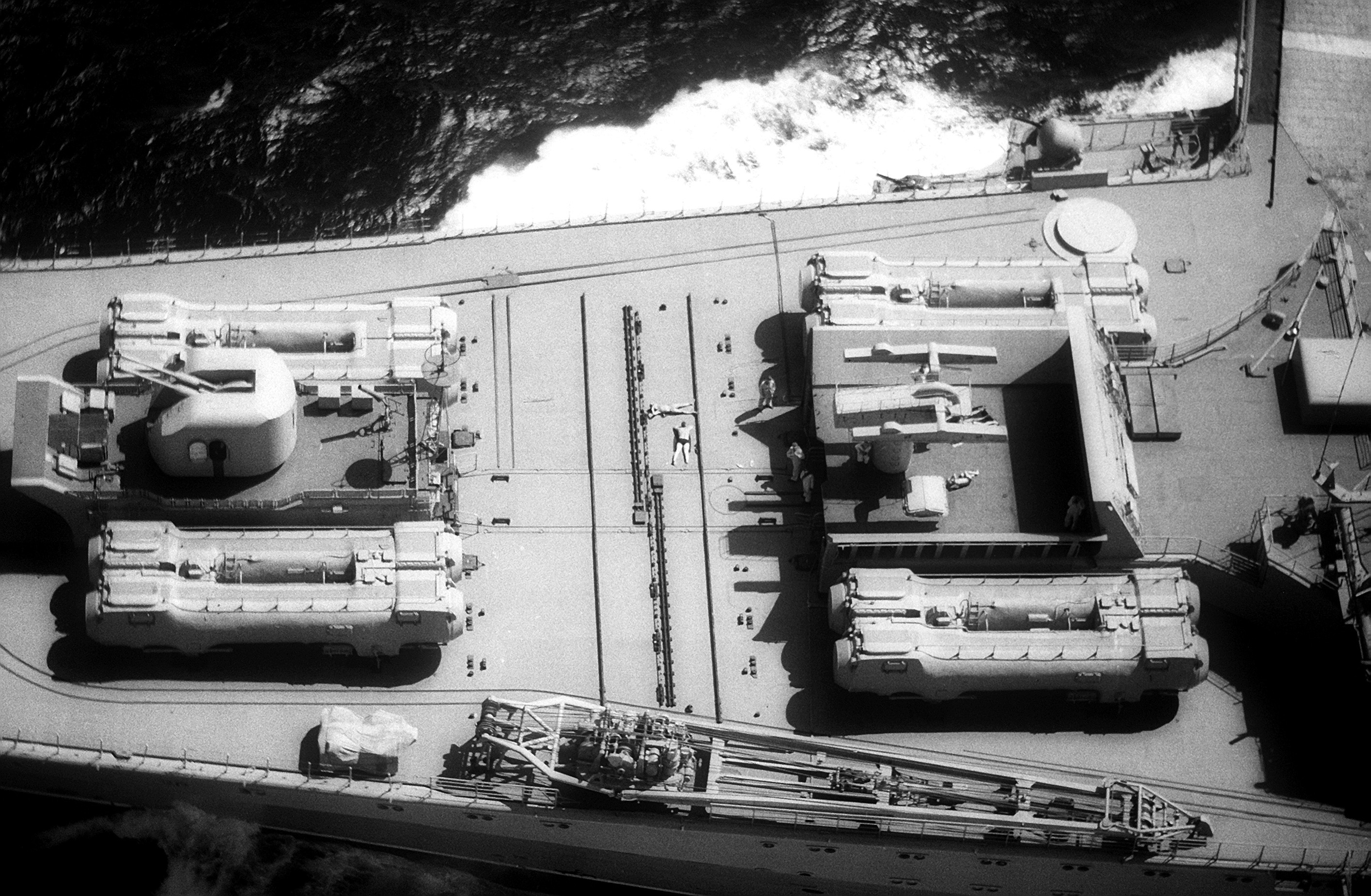
P-500 Bazalt launch tubes on the foredeck of the Kiev. M-11 and Osa-M launchers (small disk) are also visible.

The Kiev-class had a large air defence system similar to contemporary Soviet cruisers. This consisted of two M-11 Shtorm launchers to the fore and aft of the superstructure, which were used for long-range, high-altitude air defence. Two 4K33 Osa-M launchers intended for short-range, low-level air defence were mounted to the fore of the flight deck, and aft of the tower. The Baku omitted both systems in favour of four 3K95 Kinzhal (SA-N-9 Tor) complexes.

Artillery consisted of two AK-726 dual-purpose cannons, mounted on the bow and the aft superstructure. Eight AK-630 rotary cannons were mounted in pairs on corners of the ship, and acted in a CIWS role.

The Kiev was equipped with limited antisubmarine warfare systems. These consisted of an RPK-1 Vikhr nuclear depth charge launcher at the bow of the ship, and two RBU-6000 antisubmarine rocket launchers at the very end of the bow.

=== Variants and modifications ===
The class was divided into several subtypes; Kiev and Minsk were both of the Project 1143 type, while the Novorossiysk included several modifications, and was designated Project 11433. Baku was subject to extensive design changes, and was designated as Project 11434.

The Minsk and Kiev were modified between 1982 and 1983 with the addition of aerodynamic devices. Wind tunnel tests by TSAGI had determined that the addition of aerodynamic fences and a smooth fairing to the leading edge of the flight deck would improve airflow, allowing for safer STOL takeoff performance by aircraft. These changes were added to the Novorossiysk shortly after its commissioning.

Variations to the Novorossiysk included the removal of Osa-M missile systems, and the removal of the storage bunker for missile reloads. The length of the reload process would likely be extensive enough to be unused in combat, and was difficult to perform while underway, leading to its removal.

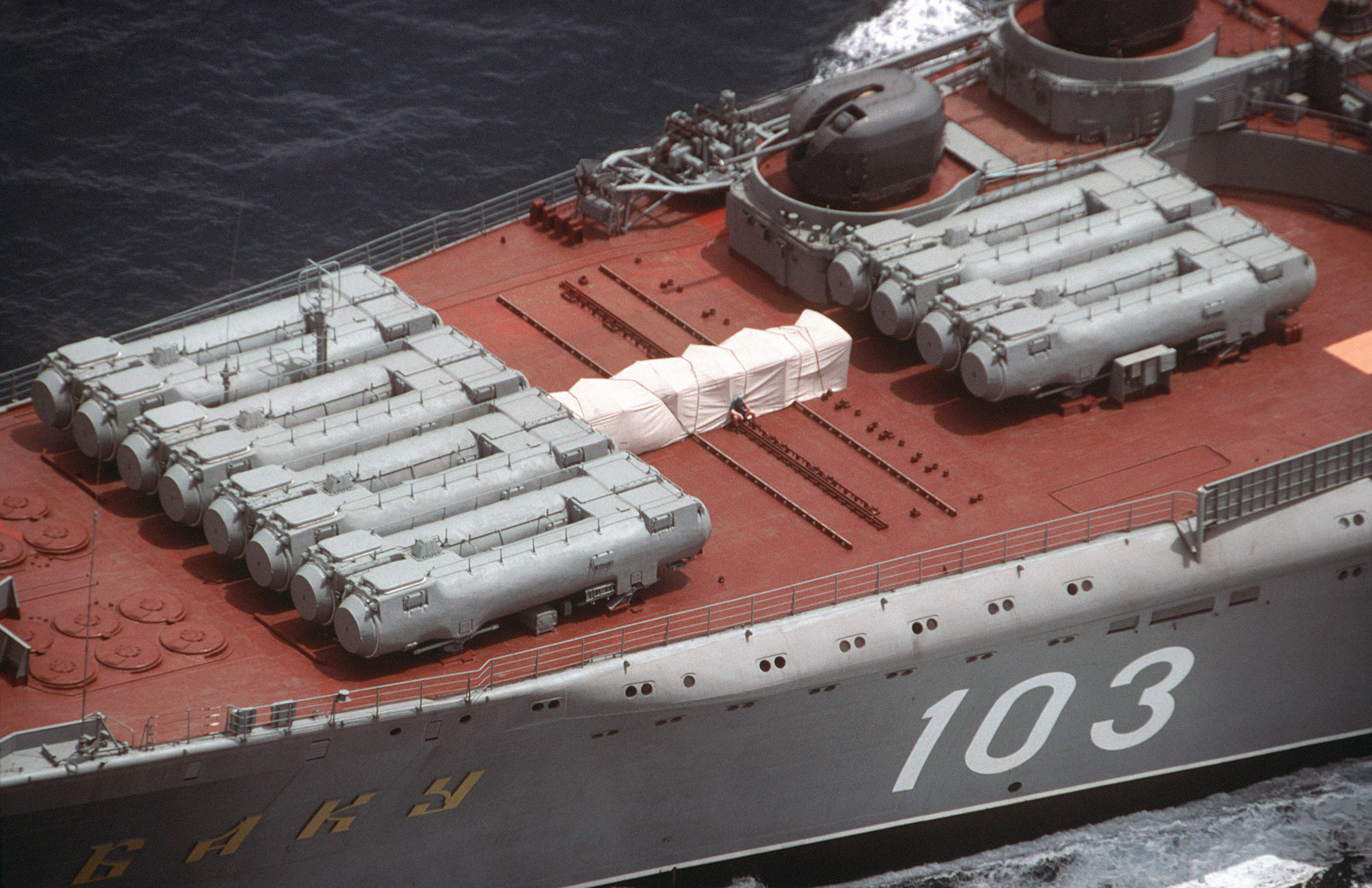
P-500 Bazalt launch tubes on the foredeck of the Baku. 3K95 Khinzal launchers (disks to front) and AK-100 guns are visible.

The Baku was extensively redesigned, with a shortened island superstructure, expanded flight deck space, and enlarged elevators, in order to better accommodate the Yak-41. The M-11 Shtorm and Osa-M systems were also removed, and replaced with four 3K95 Kinzhal systems. The AK-726 cannons were also removed and replaced with two AK-100 cannons on the bow, allowing for the superstructure to be shortened. The increase in deck space from the removal of the AK-726, M-11 launchers, and RPK-1 launcher allowed for the cruise missile armament to be expanded to 12 missiles.

== General characteristics ==
- Designer: Nevskoye Planning and Design Bureau
- Builder: Nikolayev South (formerly Chernomorsky Shipyard 444)
- Power plant: eight turbopressurized boilers, four steam turbines (200,000 shp), four shafts
- Length: 273 m (896 ft) overall [283 m (928 ft) for Baku subgroup]
- Flight deck width: 53 m (174 ft)
- Beam: 32.6 m (107 ft)
- Displacement: 43,000–45,500 metric tons full load
- Speed: 32 knots (59 km/h; 37 mph)
- Aircraft: 26–30
  - 12–13 Yak-38 VSTOL
  - 14–17 Ka-25 or Ka-27/29 helicopters
- Crew: 1,200–1,600 (including air wing)
- Armament:
  - Kiev and Minsk:
    - 4 × twin P-500 Bazalt SSM launchers (8 missiles)
    - 2 × twin M-11 Shtorm SAM launchers (72 missiles)
    - 2 × twin 9K33 Osa launchers (40 missiles)
    - 2 × AK-726 twin 76.2 mm AA guns
    - 8 × AK-630 30 mm close-in weapon system (CIWS)
    - 10 × 21" torpedo tubes
    - 1 × twin SUW-N-1 FRAS Anti-Submarine Rocket launcher
  - Novorossiysk:
    - 4 × twin P-500 Bazalt SSM launchers (8 missiles)
    - 2 × twin M-11 Shtorm SAM launchers (72 missiles)
    - 2 × AK-726 twin 76.2 mm AA guns
    - 8 × AK-630 30 mm CIWS
    - 1 × twin SUW-N-1 FRAS antisubmarine rocket launcher
  - Baku:
    - 6 × twin P-500 Bazalt SSM launchers (12 missiles)
    - 24 × 8-cell 9K330 Tor vertical SAM launchers (192 missiles)
    - 2 × 100 mm guns
    - 8 × AK-630 30 mm CIWS
    - 10 × 21" torpedo tubes
    - 2 × RBU-12000 antisubmarine rocket launchers
- Date deployed:
  - 1975 (Kiev)
  - 1978 (Minsk)
  - 1982 (Novorossiysk)
  - 1987 (Baku)

== Ships ==
Name	Project No.	Namesake	Builder	Laid down	Launched	Commissioned	Fate
Kiev	1143	City of Kiev, Ukrainian SSR	Soviet Shipyard No. 444, Nikolayev, Ukrainian SSR	21 July 1970	26 December 1972	28 December 1975	Sold to a Chinese company in 1996, converted into a theme park in Tianjin since 2004. Further renovated and developed into a luxury hotel since 2014.
Minsk	1143	City of Minsk, Byelorussian SSR	Soviet Shipyard No. 444, Nikolayev, Ukrainian SSR	28 December 1972	30 September 1975	27 September 1978	Sold to China as a museum, placed in naval museum in Jiangsu since 2016. Caught fire on 16 August 2024 future uncertain.
Novorossiysk	11433/1143M	City of Novorossiysk, Russian SFSR	Soviet Shipyard No. 444, Nikolayev, Ukrainian SSR	30 September 1975	26 December 1978	14 September 1982	Broken up at Pohang, South Korea, in 1997
Baku subclass
Admiral Gorshkov (ex-Baku)	11434	Sergey Georgiyevich Gorshkov	Soviet Shipyard No. 444, Nikolayev, Ukrainian SSR	17 February 1978	1 April 1982	11 December 1987	Sold to India in 2004, in service as INS Vikramaditya

== See also ==
- Flight deck cruiser
- List of ships of the Soviet Navy
- List of aircraft carriers of Russia and the Soviet Union
- List of ships of Russia by project number
