= Moskva-class helicopter carrier =

Soviet helicopter carrier class

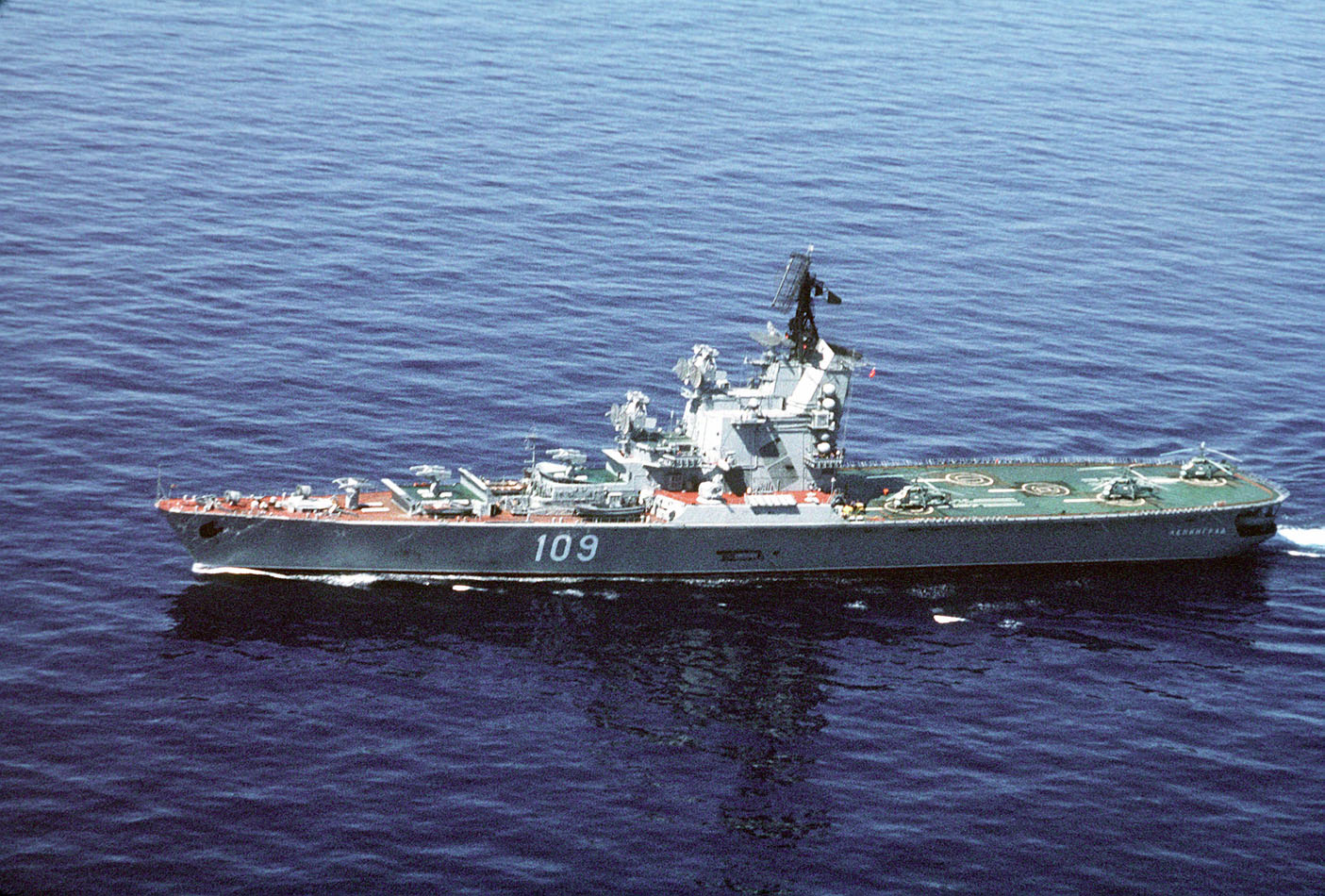
- Leningrad underway in 1990.

Class overview
- Name: Moskva class
- Operators: Soviet Navy; Russian Navy
- Succeeded by: Merkuryy Delfin; Khalzan class; Kiev class
- Subclasses: Project 11780
- Built: 1962–1969
- In service: 1967–1996
- Planned: 3
- Completed: 2
- Canceled: 1
- Retired: 2

General characteristics
- Type: Helicopter cruiser
- Displacement: 11,920 tons standard; 15,280 tons full load
- Length: 189 m (620 ft)
- Beam: 34 m (112 ft)
- Draught: 7.7 m (25 ft)
- Propulsion: 2 × 45000 hp TV-12 steam turbines, 2 × fixed pitch propellers, 2 × 1500 kW TD-1500 turbine-type generators, 2 × 1500 kW diesel-generators
- Speed: 28.5 knots (53 km/h)
- Range: 9,000 nautical miles (16,668 km) at 15 knots (28 km/h)
- Endurance: 15 days
- Complement: 850
- Sensors & processing systems: MR-600 'Voskhod'/MR-310 'Angara-A' air/surface radar; 'Don' navigation radar; 'Gurzuf'/'Gurzuf-1' ESM radar system; MRP-11-16 'Zaliv' ESM radar system; 'Kremniy-2M' IFF; ARP-50 radio direction finder; MG-342 'Orion' or MG-325 'Vega' sonar; MG-26 'Khosta' underwater communication system; MVU-201 'Koren-1123' combat information control system
- Armament: 2 × twin SA-N-3 'Goblet' surface-to-air missile launchers; 2 × twin 57 mm (2.2 in)/80 guns; 1 × SUW-N-1 launcher for FRAS-1 anti-submarine missiles; 2 × RBU-6000 ASW rockets; 10 × 553 mm (22 in) torpedo tubes (2 × 5); 2 × ZIF-121 rocket launchers (PK-2 decoy)
- Aircraft carried: 18 × Kamov Ka-25 'Hormone' or Mi-8 helicopters
- Aviation facilities: Hangar deck

The Moskva class, Soviet designation Project 1123 Kondor (condor) and S-703 Project 1123M Kiev, was the first class of operational helicopter carriers (helicopter cruisers in the Soviet classification) built by the Soviet Union for the Soviet Navy.

These ships were laid down at Nikolayev South (Shipyard No.444). The lead vessel was launched in 1965 and named Moskva (Russian: Москва, lit. 'Moscow'); she entered service two years later. Moskva was followed by Leningrad (Russian: Ленинград, lit. 'Lenin City', which was commissioned in late 1968; there were no further vessels built, reportedly due to the poor handling of the ships in rough seas. Both were conventionally powered.

The Moskvas were not true "aircraft carriers" in that they did not carry any fixed-wing aircraft; the air wing was composed entirely of helicopters. They were designed primarily as anti-submarine warfare (ASW) vessels, and her weapons and sensor suite was optimized against the nuclear submarine threat. Their strategic role was to form the flagships of an ASW task force.

== Design ==
The operational requirement was issued by Admiral Sergey Gorshkov in 1959. The aim of the ships was to counter NATO Polaris submarines and act as a flagship for anti-submarine warfare. Initially it was hoped to operate ten helicopters from an 8000-ton ship. The design evolved into a larger vessel capable of operating up to 14 helicopters with self defence armament.

=== Armament ===
Shipboard ASW armament included a twin SUW-N-1 launcher capable of delivering a FRAS-1 projectile carrying a 450-millimetre (18 in) torpedo (or a 10 kiloton nuclear warhead); a pair of RBU-6000 ASW mortars; and a set of torpedo tubes. For self-defence, the Moskvas had two twin SA-N-3 surface-to-air missile (SAM) launchers with reloads for a total of 48 surface-to-air missiles, along with two twin 57 mm (2.2 in) /80 guns.

=== Propulsion ===
Gas turbines were considered but were as yet untried in such a large vessel. Instead a high pressure steam plant similar to that used by the Kynda-class cruisers was used. The machinery of Moskva had severe problems and had to be rebuilt in 1973 following a fire. Operational performance was disappointing with a practical maximum speed of 30 knots (56 km/h; 35 mph) and 24-knot (44 km/h; 28 mph) maximum sustainable speed. Sea keeping was also disappointing.

== Ships ==
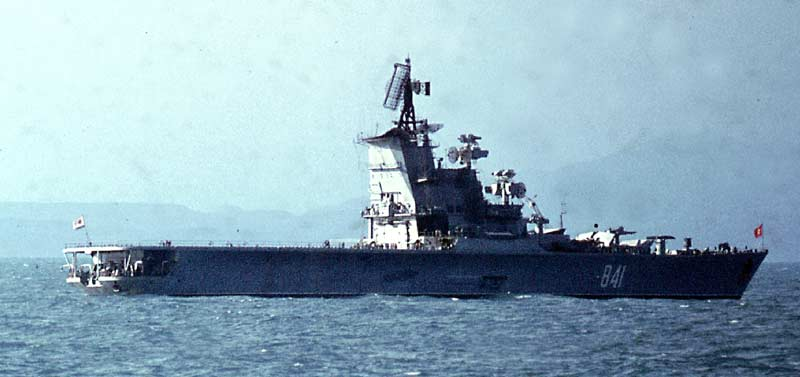
Moskva off the Moroccan coast in January 1970.

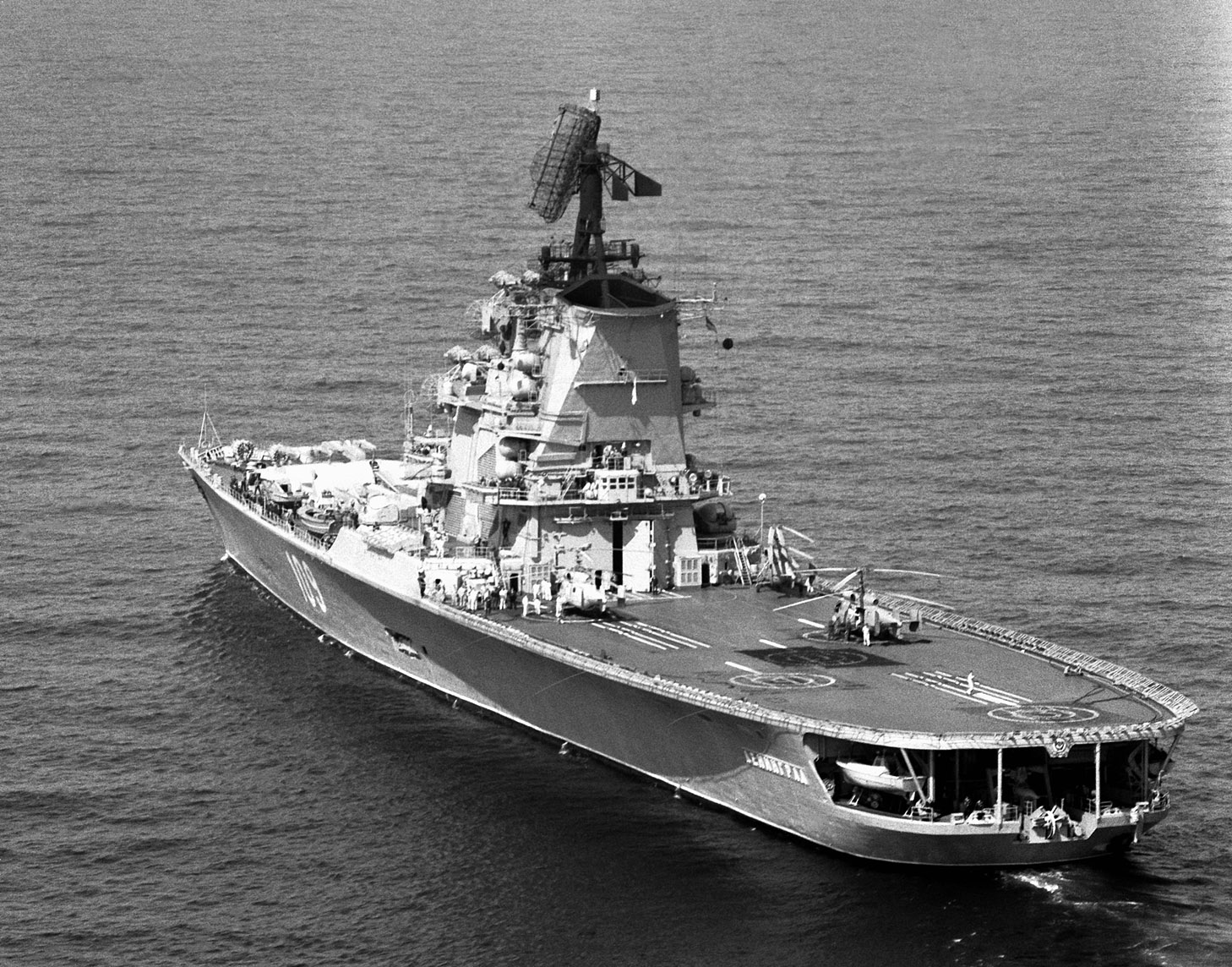
A port-quarter fantail view of Leningrad.

Both vessels were part of the Black Sea Fleet. Leningrad was retired in 1991 and Moskva in 1996. Leningrad was scrapped in 1995 and Moskva in 1997. A third ship to be named Kiev was cancelled in 1969, which was to have been an anti-surface warfare vessel. The Moskva class was succeeded by the larger Kiev class.

Name	Namesake	Builder	Laid down	Launched	Commissioned	Fate
Moskva	City of Moscow	Soviet Shipyard No. 444, Mykolaiv	15 December 1962	14 January 1965	25 December 1967	Broken up at Alang, 1997
Leningrad	City of Leningrad	Soviet Shipyard No. 444, Mykolaiv	15 January 1965	31 July 1968	2 June 1969	Broken up, Greece, 1995
Kiev	City of Kiev	Soviet Shipyard No. 444, Mykolaiv	December 1967	—N/a	—N/a	Cancelled 1969

== See also ==
- List of ships of the Soviet Navy
- List of ships of Russia by project number
- List of aircraft carriers

Equivalent helicopter carriers of the same era

- Vittorio Veneto class
- Jeanne d'Arc class
- Haruna class
