= Soviet cruiser Admiral Makarov (1970) =

Soviet Kresta II-class cruiser

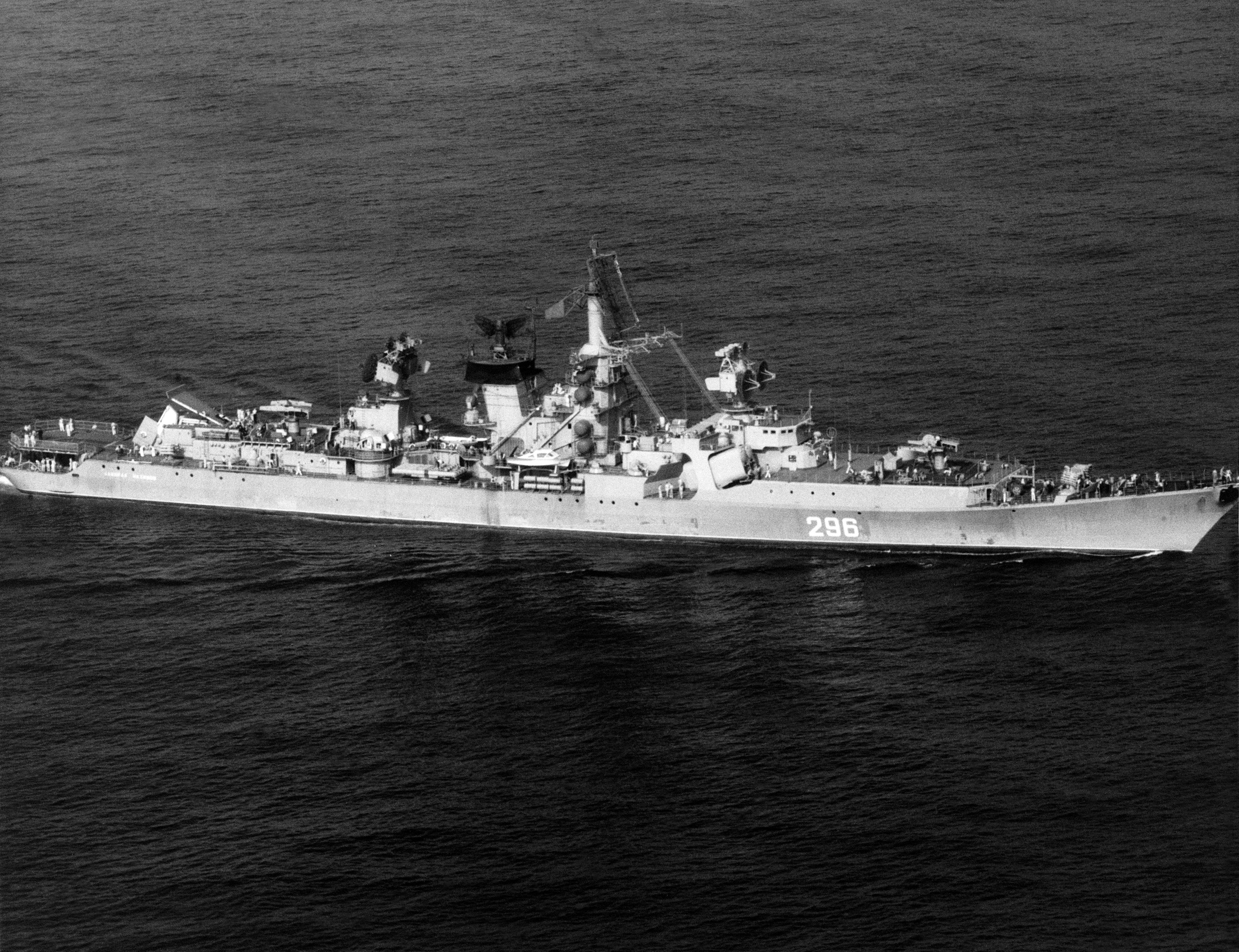
- Admiral Makarov in 1985

History

→ Soviet Union → Russia
- Name: Admiral Makarov
- Namesake: Stepan Makarov
- Builder: Zhdanov Shipyard
- Laid down: 23 February 1969
- Launched: 22 November 1970
- Commissioned: 25 October 1972
- Decommissioned: 3 July 1992
- Fate: Sold for scrap, 1994

General characteristics
- Class & type: Kresta II-class cruiser
- Displacement: 5,600 tons standard; 7,535 tons full load
- Length: 156.5 m (513 ft)
- Beam: 17.2 m (56 ft)
- Draught: 5.96 m (19.6 ft)
- Propulsion: 2 shaft steam turbines; 4 boilers; 91,000–100,000 shp (68,000–75,000 kW)
- Speed: 34 kn (63 km/h; 39 mph)
- Range: 10,500 nmi (19,400 km; 12,100 mi) at 14 kn (26 km/h; 16 mph); 5,200 nmi (9,600 km; 6,000 mi) at 18 kn (33 km/h; 21 mph)
- Endurance: 1830 tons fuel oil
- Complement: 343
- Sensors & processing systems: Radar; Volga; MR-600 Voskhod; MR-310U Angara M; 2 x 4R60 Grom; 2 x MR-103 Bars; Sonar; MG-332T Titan-2T
- Armament: 2 quad SS-N-14 Silex anti-submarine missiles; 2 twin SA-N-3 Goblet surface-to-air missile launchers (72 missiles); 2 twin 57 mm/70 AK-725 anti-aircraft guns; 4 30 mm AK-630 CIWS; 2 quintuple 533 mm torpedo tubes
- Aircraft carried: 1 Kamov Ka-25 'Hormone-A'
- Aviation facilities: Helicopter deck and hangar

Admiral Makarov (Russian: Адмирал Макаров) was a Project 1134A Berkut A (NATO reporting name Kresta II) class cruiser of the Soviet Navy and briefly of the Russian Navy. The fourth ship of her class, the ship served mostly during the Cold War, from 1972 to 1992. She served with the Northern Fleet for the duration of her career, often operating in the Atlantic and the Mediterranean in order to show the flag, and was refitted between 1983 and 1985. She was decommissioned in 1992 due to deteriorating conditions which reduced naval funding prevented from being addressed before being sold for scrap in 1994.

== Design ==
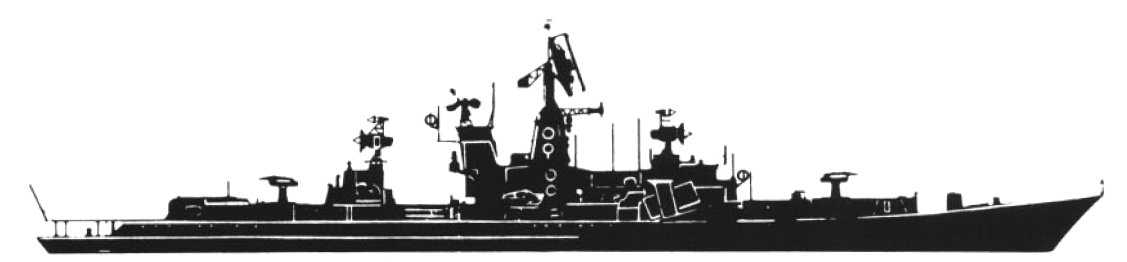
A United States Navy-produced profile drawing of a Kresta II-class cruiser

Admiral Makarov was the fourth ship of her class of ten Project 1134A Berkut A (NATO reporting name Kresta II-class) cruisers, designed by Vasily Anikeyev. They were designated as Large Anti-Submarine Ships in accordance with their primary mission of countering NATO submarines.

As a Kresta II-class cruiser, Admiral Makarov was 156.5 metres (513.5 ft) long with a beam of 17.2 m (56.4 ft) and a draught of 5.96 m (19.6 ft). She displaced 5,600 tons standard, 6,500 tons light and 7,535 full load, and had a complement of 343. The ship was equipped with a hangar aft to carry a single Kamov Ka-25 Hormone-A helicopter.

Admiral Makarov was propelled by two TV-12 steam geared turbines powered by four high pressure boilers which created 75,000 kilowatts (100,577 hp), giving her a maximum speed of 34 knots (63 km/h; 39 mph). She had a range of 5,200 nmi (9,630 km; 5,984 mi) at 18 kn (33 km/h; 21 mph) and 1,754.86 nmi (3,250 km; 2,019 mi) at 32 kn (59 km/h; 37 mph).

=== Armament ===
For her primary role as an anti-submarine cruiser, Admiral Makarov mounted two quadruple launchers for eight anti-submarine missiles in the Metel anti-ship complex. She was also equipped with two RBU-6000 12-barrel and two RBU-1000 6-barrel rocket launchers. The Ka-25 helicopter embarked on the cruiser was also capable of aiding in the search and destruction of submarines.

Admiral Makarov was armed with four AK-725 57 mm L/80 DP guns situated in two twin mountings to protect against aerial threats. She also had four 30 mm AK-630 CIWS mountings, and was armed with two twin launchers for the 48 V-611 surface-to-air missiles they carried in the M-11 Shtorm system. She also mounted two quintuple mountings for 533 mm (21 in) dual-role torpedoes.

=== Electronics warfare ===
Admiral Makarov was equipped with the MR-600 Voskhod (NATO code name Top Sail) early warning air search radar, the MR-310U Angara-M (NATO code name Head Net C) search radar, and the Volga (NATO code names Don Kay and Don-2) navigational radar. For anti-submarine warfare she had improved MG-332T Titan-2T hull mounted sonar. For fire control purposes she had Grom SA-N-1 fire control and MR-103 Bars AK725 fire control. Admiral Makarov also had a MG-26 communications outfit and a MG-35 Shtil sonar. As one of the first four ships in her class, Admiral Makarov used manual targeting for the AK-630 due to not having received the Vympel fire control radar.

== Construction ==
On 2 August 1968, Admiral Makarov, named for Russian naval commander during the Russo-Japanese War Stepan Makarov, was added to the list of ships of the Soviet Navy. Built in the Zhdanov Shipyard with the serial number 724, the cruiser was laid down on 23 February 1969 and launched on 22 November 1970. The flag of the Soviet Navy was hoisted for the first time about the ship on 2 July 1972, and she was tested in the Baltic between 9 August and 20 October, before commissioning on 25 October, under the command of Captain 2nd rank Valentin Chkalov.

== Career ==
=== 1970s ===
Admiral Makarov was relocated to Baltiysk during November in preparation for its voyage to the Northern Fleet. There, it was visited by Soviet Minister of Defense Andrei Grechko and Commander-in-Chief of the Soviet Navy Admiral of the fleet of the Soviet Union Sergey Gorshkov. The cruiser was assigned to the Northern Fleet's 170th Anti-Submarine Warfare Brigade, part of the 7th Operational Squadron, on 22 January 1973. She departed for Severomorsk on 28 March, but collided in fog with the Czech freighter Kladno in the Fehmarn Belt two days later; this forced her to return to the dockyard for repair. After moving to Severomorsk, the main base of the Northern Fleet, Admiral Makarov participated in Exercise Laguna, tracking possible NATO submarines in the North Atlantic alongside Kresta I-class missile cruiser Sevastopol and her sister Kresta II-class ship Admiral Isakov between 12 and 29 May.

Commander-in-Chief of the Soviet Navy Admiral of the Fleet Sergey Gorshkov visited her on 27 May 1974 while with the Northern Fleet to direct the Signal-74 exercise. It operated in the Mediterranean and the Central and South Atlantic from 17 June as part of a detachment of ships under the command of deputy squadron commander Captain 1st rank G.V. Yegorov. During her cruise Admiral Makarov visited Havana and Cienfuegos between 24 and 29 September and Casablanca between 2 and 6 December before returning to Severomorsk on 6 January 1975, completing a 24,829 nautical mile voyage. The cruiser participated in the massive Okean-75 exercise between 3 and 21 April in a search and attack group with her sister Kresta II-class cruiser Admiral Nakhimov, tracking an enemy submarine to the edge of polar ice.

Admiral Makarov operated in the South Atlantic between 7 November and 5 July 1976, visiting Conakry and Luanda. Temporarily based at the latter, she provided air defense for MPLA forces in the Angolan Civil War and security for transport ships carrying Cuban troops to fight in that war, as well as fisheries protection later in the cruise. In February, she provided fire support for the MPLA. The ship was declared excellent in 1977 and the crew received thanks in an order from Gorshkov for "conscientious fulfillment of duties" in military and political training during 1976. She was transferred to the 120th Missile Ship Brigade on 26 December of that year, and in September 1978 the cruiser monitored the NATO exercise Northern Wedding-78 in difficult weather conditions. It then took part in the Razbeg-79 command staff exercise directed by Gorshkov between 5 and 12 April 1979 as part of a search and attack group with the aircraft carrier Kiev, sister Kresta-II class cruiser Marshal Timoshenko, missile destroyer Ognevoy, and destroyer Moskovsky Komsomolets, testing the effectiveness of the anti-submarine barrier by tracking a NATO submarine.

=== 1980s and end of service ===
After returning to the 170th Brigade on 12 February 1982, Admiral Makarov was repaired and modernized at the SRZ-35 shipyard in Murmansk from 23 March 1983 to 26 December 1985, temporarily part of the 48th Separate Battalion of Ships undergoing construction or overhaul. During the refit, she received updated Rastrub-B missiles for her Metel, the Shlyuz satellite navigation system and the Tsunami-BM satellite communications system. The Rastrub-B was successfully test fired in April 1986. Between 24 and 28 March 1987, Admiral Makarov participated in a command staff exercise led by fleet commander Admiral of the fleet Ivan Kapitanets alongside the battlecruiser Kirov, cruisers Vitse-Admiral Drozd, Marshal Ustinov, Admiral Nakhimov, Kronstadt, and Admiral Yumashev, and destroyers Soobrazitelnyy, Otlichnyy, Sovremennyy, and Otchayannyy. It operated in the Mediterranean from 7 December of that year alongside Marshal Ustinov, moving through severe storms until passing Rockall on the voyage to the Mediterranean. On 20 February 1988, a sailor tossed a lighted cigarette into a ventilation shaft, causing an engine room fire; emergency parties extinguished the fire in three hours. During the cruise, she operated in the Strait of Otranto and visited Latakia between 26 and 31 March under the flag of 5th Operational Squadron commander Counter Admiral Vladimir Yegorov, receiving dignitaries including Hikmat al-Shihabi, Chief of Staff of the Syrian Army.

The cruiser participated in Black Sea Fleet exercises on 4 April in the central Tyrrhenian Sea, during which her Ka-25 helicopter became lost and made a forced landing aboard the Bulgarian dry cargo ship Burgas. The helicopter was flown back after both ships rendezvoused and the necessary fuel was transferred, although the crew responsible was suspended from flying for the rest of the cruise. In order to rest the crew and carry out repairs the ship temporarily docked at Tartus Naval Base between 12 April and 10 May. After departing Tartus she shadowed the carrier group led by United States aircraft carrier USS Dwight D. Eisenhower between 12 May and 10 June when the latter put into İzmir. After replenishing supplies from the tanker Gori on 13 June she began the voyage back to Severomorsk, where she arrived on 23 June, having sailed 21,680 nautical miles.

On 1 October 1991 the 170th Brigade was redesignated as the 44th Anti-Submarine Warfare Division. After the dissolution of the Soviet Union the cruiser was transferred to the Russian Navy. Admiral Makarov was decommissioned on 3 July 1992 due to the deterioration of the ship and lack of funds for repair. Her crew was disbanded on 31 December 1992, and the hull was sold to an Indian company for scrapping in 1994. During her career, Admiral Nakhimov was assigned the temporary tactical numbers 583, 585, 547, 291, 541, 690 (in 1978), 648, 666, 667, and 657 (in the 1980s and 1990s).

== Commanding officers ==
Admiral Makarov was commanded by the following officers during her career:

- Captain 2nd rank Valentin Chkalov (1970–1974)
- Captain 2nd rank Valentin Chirov (1974–1975)
- Captain 3rd rank Vladimir Muzalevsky (1975–1977)
- Captain 2nd rank Pavel Popov (1978–1980)
- Captain 3rd rank Vyacheslav Kondrashov (1980–1982)
- Captain 3rd rank Vladimir Veregin (1983–1984)
- Captain 2nd rank Valery Pravilenko (1984–1989)
- Captain 3rd rank Pyotr Karpov (1989–1991)
- Captain 3rd rank Sergey Shevchenko (1991–1994)
