= Soviet cruiser Admiral Nakhimov (1969) =

Soviet Kresta II-class cruiser

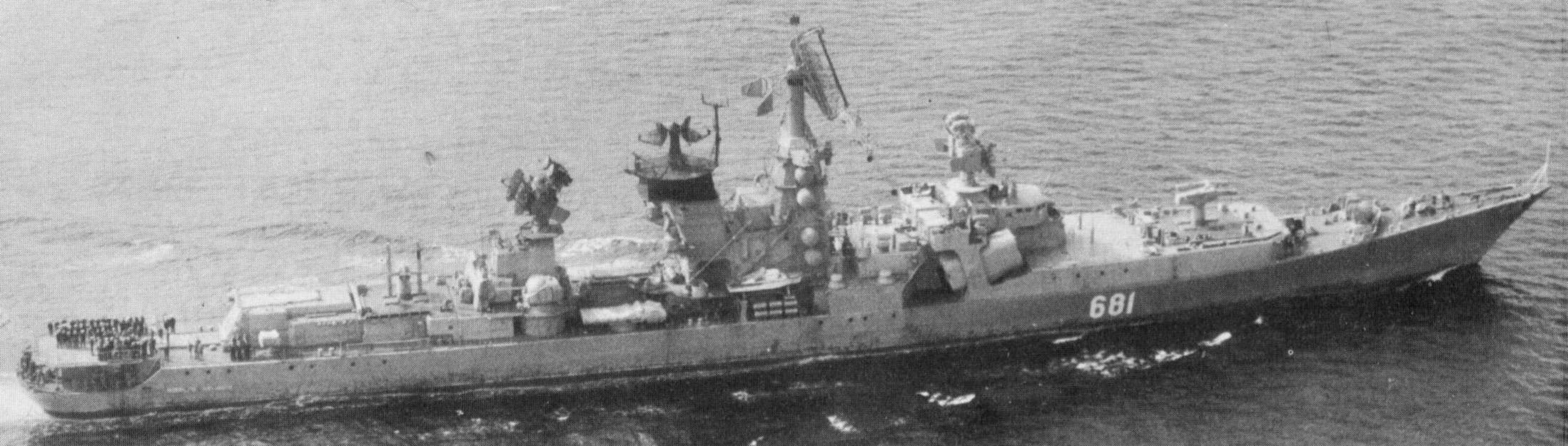
- Admiral Nakhimov in 1979

History

Soviet Union
- Name: Admiral Nakhimov
- Namesake: Pavel Nakhimov
- Builder: Zhdanov Shipyard
- Laid down: 15 January 1968
- Launched: 15 April 1969
- Commissioned: 29 November 1971
- Decommissioned: 31 January 1991
- Fate: Sold for scrap, 1993

General characteristics
- Class & type: Kresta II-class cruiser
- Displacement: 5,600 tons standard; 7,535 tons full load
- Length: 156.5 m (513 ft)
- Beam: 17.2 m (56 ft)
- Draught: 5.96 m (19.6 ft)
- Propulsion: 2 shaft steam turbines; 4 boilers; 91,000–100,000 shp (68,000–75,000 kW)
- Speed: 34 kn (63 km/h; 39 mph)
- Range: 10,500 nmi (19,400 km; 12,100 mi) at 14 kn (26 km/h; 16 mph); 5,200 nmi (9,600 km; 6,000 mi) at 18 kn (33 km/h; 21 mph)
- Endurance: 1830 tons fuel oil
- Complement: 343
- Sensors & processing systems: Radar; Volga; MR-600 Voskhod; MR-310U Angara M; 2 x 4R60 Grom; 2 x MR-103 Bars; Sonar; MG-332T Titan-2T
- Armament: 2 quad SS-N-14 Silex anti-submarine missiles; 2 twin SA-N-3 Goblet surface-to-air missile launchers (72 missiles); 2 twin 57 mm/70 AK-725 anti-aircraft guns; 4 30 mm AK-630 CIWS; 2 quintuple 533 mm torpedo tubes
- Aircraft carried: 1 Kamov Ka-25 'Hormone-A'
- Aviation facilities: Helicopter deck and hangar

Admiral Nakhimov (Russian: Адмирал Нахимов) was a Project 1134A Kresta II-class cruiser of the Soviet Navy, named for Russian naval commander Pavel Nakhimov. The third ship of her class, the ship served during the Cold War, from 1971 to 1991. She served with the Northern Fleet for the duration of her career, often operating in the Atlantic and the Mediterranean in order to show the flag. She was decommissioned in 1991 before being sold for scrap due to reduced naval funding in 1993.

== Design ==
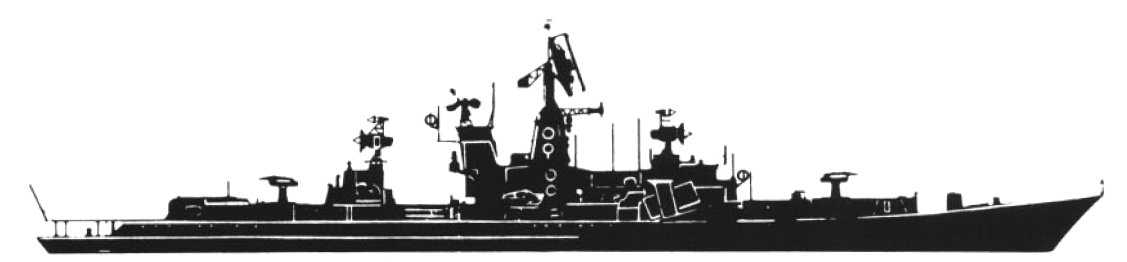
A United States Navy-produced profile drawing of a Kresta II-class cruiser

Admiral Nakhimov was the third ship of her class of ten Project 1134A Berkut A (NATO reporting name Kresta II-class) cruisers, designed by Vasily Anikeyev. She was named in honor of Russian naval commander Pavel Nakhimov, who commanded forces during the 1854–1855 Siege of Sevastopol in the Crimean War. They were designated as Large Anti-Submarine Ships in accordance with their primary mission of countering NATO submarines.

As a Kresta II-class cruiser, Admiral Nakhimov was 156.5 metres (513.5 ft) long with a beam of 17.2 m (56.4 ft) and a draught of 5.96 m (19.6 ft). She displaced 5,600 tons standard, 6,500 tons light and 7,535 full load, and had a complement of 343. The ship was equipped with a hangar aft to carry a single Kamov Ka-25 Hormone-A helicopter.

Admiral Nakhimov was propelled by two TV-12 steam geared turbines powered by four high pressure boilers which created 75,000 kilowatts (100,577 hp), giving her a maximum speed of 34 knots (63 km/h; 39 mph). She had a range of 5,200 nmi (9,630 km; 5,984 mi) at 18 kn (33 km/h; 21 mph) and 1,754.86 nmi (3,250 km; 2,019 mi) at 32 kn (59 km/h; 37 mph).

=== Armament ===
For her primary role as an anti-submarine cruiser, Admiral Nakhimov mounted two quadruple launchers for eight anti-submarine missiles in the Metel anti-ship complex. She was also equipped with two RBU-6000 12-barrel and two RBU-1000 6-barrel rocket launchers. The Ka-25 helicopter embarked on the cruiser was also capable of aiding in the search and destruction of submarines.

Against aerial threats Admiral Nakhimov was armed with four AK-725 57 mm L/80 DP guns situated in two twin mountings. She also had four 30 mm AK-630 CIWS mountings, and was armed with two twin launchers for the 48 V-611 surface-to-air missiles they carried in the M-11 Shtorm system. She also mounted two quintuple mountings for 533 mm (21 in) dual-role torpedoes.

=== Electronics warfare ===
Admiral Nakhimov was equipped with the MR-600 Voskhod (NATO code name Top Sail) early warning air search radar, the MR-310U Angara-M (NATO code name Head Net C) search radar, and the Volga (NATO code names Don Kay and Don-2) navigational radar. For anti-submarine warfare she had improved MG-332T Titan-2T hull mounted sonar. For fire control purposes she had Grom SA-N-1 fire control and MR-103 Bars AK725 fire control. Admiral Nakhimov also had a MG-26 communications outfit and a MG-35 Shtil sonar. As one of the first four ships in her class, Admiral Nakhimov used manual targeting for the AK-630 due to not having received the Vympel fire control radar.

== Construction ==
On 2 August 1968, Admiral Nakhimov was added to the list of ships of the Soviet Navy. Built in the Zhdanov Shipyard with the serial number 723, the cruiser was laid down on 15 January 1968 and launched on 15 April 1969. The flag of the Soviet Navy was hoisted for the first time about the ship on 8 July 1971, before she was commissioned on 29 November.

== Career ==
=== 1970s ===
Admiral Nakhimov was assigned to the Northern Fleet's 170th Anti-Submarine Warfare Brigade on 13 December 1971; she arrived at the fleet's base of Severomorsk on 24 June 1972, under the command of Captain 2nd rank Valentin Chirov. From 10 October she conducted her first operational cruise in the Central Atlantic and Mediterranean. Between 19 and 24 October she participated in the Duet and Ladoga anti-submarine search exercises of the Northern Fleet in the Norwegian Sea and the northeast Atlantic with the missile cruiser Sevastopol and the destroyer Byvalvyy. On 1 December, while anchored at Sallum, two sailors deserted, resulting in the transfer of Chirov and her political officer after the cruiser returned to Severomorsk.

She was visited by the commander-in-chief of the Soviet Navy, Admiral of the fleet of the Soviet Union Sergey Gorshkov, on 7 February 1973. Evaluated as satisfactory in an April Ministry of Defense inspection, Admiral Nakhimov participated in the Laguna anti-submarine tracking exercise in the North Atlantic alongside sister Kresta II-class cruiser Kronstadt between 12 May and 3 June, tracking a probable NATO submarine after steaming into the Norwegian Sea from 14 May until the latter entered Norwegian territorial waters. Chief Inspector of the Ministry of Defense Marshal of the Soviet Union Kirill Moskalenko and his deputy, Colonel General Pavel Yefimov, visited the ship on 12 April 1974.

The cruiser operated in the Mediterranean and the Central Atlantic between 17 June and 8 December, participating in the evacuation of Soviet citizens from Limassol during the Cyprus crisis in July alongside destroyer Krasny Kavkaz, landing ship SDK-82, and motor vessel Bashkiriya. For "skilled actions" she and other ships involved were thanked by Minister of Defense Marshal of the Soviet Union Andrei Grechko. Admiral Nakhimov subsequently visited Havana and Cienfuegos between 24 and 29 September, and Casablanca from 2 to 6 December. With sister Kresta II-class cruiser Admiral Makarov, she participated in the massive Okean-75 exercise between 3 and 21 April 1975. Admiral Nakhimov shadowed a United States Navy force centered around USS Nimitz between 17 August and 6 September 1975. By the end of the year she was declared the best ship in the Northern Fleet for anti-submarine torpedo launching.

Between 11 April and 9 October 1977, Admiral Nakhimov operated in the South Atlantic. In the first stage of her cruise, between 14 and 19 April, she participated in the Sever-77 command staff exercise as part of a detachment with missile cruisers Admiral Zozulya and Vitse-Admiral Drozd, and in the Estafeta-77 air defense exercise. She visited Conakry during the cruise, and took first in a fleet submarine search competition later that year. Admiral Nakhimov again operated in the Atlantic and the Mediterranean between 23 June and 10 October 1979.

=== 1980s and end of service ===
From 24 February 1981 to 8 May 1982, she was repaired and modernized at the Kronstadt Marine Plant as part of the Leningrad Naval Base's 95th Separate Battalion of Ships undergoing construction or overhaul. Admiral Nakhimov returned to Severomorsk from Baltiysk on 4 June. Between 26 May and 22 December 1983 she made another cruise to the South Atlantic, visiting Conakry and being temporarily based at Luanda as part of the 30th Operational Brigade between 4 July and 13 November. During this period the cruiser provided air defense for Soviet-backed MPLA forces holding Luanda. After returning to Severomorsk, she participated in the Atlantika-84 command staff exercise between 31 March and 8 April 1984. During July and August 1985 she escorted the battlecruiser Frunze to Cape Finisterre during the latter's voyage to the Pacific Fleet, with the destroyers Admiral Spiridonov and Osmotritelnyy.

During a training exercise, Admiral Nakhimov collided with the submarine K-255 on 14 February 1986, damaging her hull below the waterline, necessitating repairs. No serious injuries occurred on either vessel. Beginning on 1 March 1989 she underwent repairs and modernization at SRZ-35 in Murmansk, but these were halted due to a lack of funding. Admiral Nakhimov was decommissioned on 31 January 1991 before her naval jack was lowered for the last time in May 1992. Her crew was disbanded on 4 June 1992, and the hull was sold to an Indian company for scrapping in 1993. During her career, Admiral Nakhimov was assigned the temporary tactical numbers 293 (in 1974), 554, 581 (in 1984), 697, 681, and 670.

== Commanding officers ==
Admiral Nakhimov was commanded by the following officers during her career:

- Captain 2nd rank Valentin Chirov (1970–1973)
- Captain 2nd rank Vladislav Vorobyov (1973–1975)
- Captain 2nd rank Georgy Dubina (1975–1983)
- Captain 2nd rank Vladimir Dobroskochenko (1983–1984)
- Captain 2nd rank Vyacheslav Bezugly (1984–1987)
- Captain 2nd rank Viktor Kolesnik (1987–1989)
- Captain 2nd rank Nikolay Kazakov (1989–1992)
