= Soviet cruiser Kronstadt =

Soviet Navy's Kresta II-class cruiser

History

Soviet Union
- Name: Kronstadt
- Namesake: Kronstadt
- Builder: Zhdanov Shipyard
- Laid down: 30 November 1966
- Launched: 10 February 1968
- Commissioned: 29 December 1969
- Decommissioned: 24 June 1991
- Fate: Scrapped 1993

General characteristics
- Class & type: Kresta II-class cruiser
- Displacement: 5,600 tons standard; 7,535 tons full load
- Length: 156.5 m (513 ft)
- Beam: 17.2 m (56 ft)
- Draught: 5.96 m (19.6 ft)
- Propulsion: 2 shaft steam turbines; 4 boilers; 91,000–100,000 shp (68,000–75,000 kW)
- Speed: 34 kn (63 km/h; 39 mph)
- Range: 10,500 nmi (19,400 km; 12,100 mi) at 14 kn (26 km/h; 16 mph); 5,200 nmi (9,600 km; 6,000 mi) at 18 kn (33 km/h; 21 mph)
- Endurance: 1830 tons fuel oil
- Complement: 343
- Sensors & processing systems: Radar; Volga; MR-600 Voskhod; MR-310U Angara M; 2 x 4R60 Grom; 2 x MR-103 Bars; Sonar; MG-332 Titan-2
- Armament: 2 quad SS-N-14 Silex anti-submarine missiles; 2 twin SA-N-3 Goblet surface-to-air missile launchers (72 missiles); 2 twin 57 mm/70 AK-725 anti-aircraft guns; 4 30 mm AK-630 CIWS; 2 quintuple 533 mm torpedo tubes
- Aircraft carried: 1 Kamov Ka-25 'Hormone-A'
- Aviation facilities: Helicopter deck and hangar

Kronstadt (Russian: Кронштадт) was a Project 1134A Kresta II-class cruiser of the Soviet Navy, named for the Kronstadt naval base. The first ship of her class, the ship served during the Cold War, from 1969 to 1991. She served with the Northern Fleet, with her shakedown cruise being through the Mediterranean Sea. After colliding with a destroyer in 1975, she spent five years being repaired and modernized. She was decommissioned in 1991 before being sold for scrap two years later due to reduced naval funding and deteriorating conditions.

== Design ==
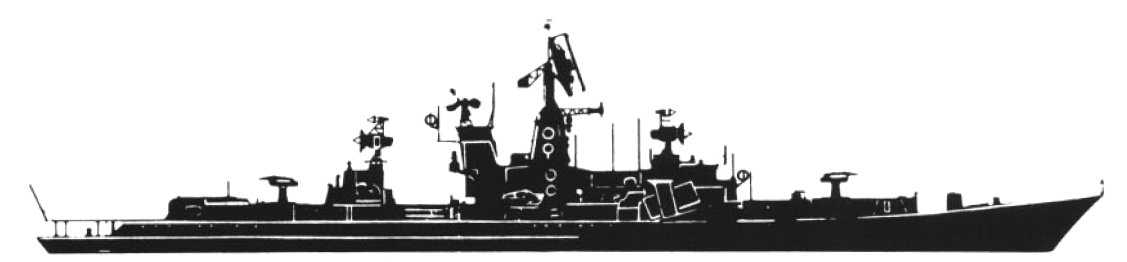
A United States Navy-produced profile drawing of a Kresta II-class cruiser

Kronstadt was the lead ship of her class of ten Project 1134A Berkut A (NATO reporting name Kresta II-class) cruisers, designed by Vasily Anikeyev. She was named for the main Baltic Fleet naval base at Kronstadt. They were designated as Large Anti-Submarine Ships in accordance with their primary mission of countering NATO submarines.

As a Kresta II-class cruiser, Kronstadt was 156.5 metres (513 ft) long with a beam of 17.2 m (56 ft) and a draught of 5.96 m (19.6 ft). She displaced 5,600 tons standard, 6,500 tons light, and 7,535 full load, and had a complement of 343. The ship was equipped with a hangar aft to carry a single Kamov Ka-25 Hormone-A helicopter.

Kronstadt was propelled by two TV-12 steam geared turbines powered by four high pressure boilers which created 75,000 kilowatts (101,000 hp), giving her a maximum speed of 34 knots (63 km/h; 39 mph). She had a range of 5,200 nmi (9,600 km; 6,000 mi) at 18 kn (33 km/h; 21 mph) and 1,754.86 nmi (3,250.00 km; 2,019.46 mi) at 32 kn (59 km/h; 37 mph).

=== Armament ===
For her primary role as an anti-submarine cruiser, Kronstadt mounted two quadruple launchers for eight anti-submarine missiles in the Metel anti-ship complex. She was also equipped with two RBU-6000 12-barrel and two RBU-1000 6-barrel rocket launchers. The Ka-25 helicopter embarked on the cruiser was also capable of aiding in the search and destruction of submarines.

Against aerial threats Kronstadt was armed with four AK-725 57 mm L/80 DP guns situated in two twin mountings. She also had four 30 mm AK-630 CIWS mountings, and was armed with two twin launchers for the 48 V-611 surface-to-air missiles they carried in the M-11 Shtorm system. She also mounted two quintuple mountings for 533 mm (21.0 in) dual-role torpedoes.

=== Electronics warfare ===
Kronstadt was equipped with the MR-600 Voskhod (NATO code name Top Sail) early warning air search radar, the MR-310U Angara-M (NATO code name Head Net C) search radar, and the Volga (NATO code names Don Kay and Don-2) navigational radar. For anti-submarine warfare she had MG-332 Titan-2 hull mounted sonar, the only ship of her class thus equipped. For fire control purposes she had Grom SA-N-1 fire control and MR-103 Bars AK725 fire control. Kronstadt also had a MG-26 communications outfit and a MG-35 Shtil. She received the earlier version of the Grom fire control radar, which was incapable of providing guidance for the Metel anti-submarine missile system, limiting her effectiveness in anti-submarine warfare. As one of the first four ships in her class, Kronstadt used manual targeting for the AK-630 due to not having received the Vympel fire control radar.

== Construction ==
On 12 December 1966, Kronstadt was added to the list of ships of the Soviet Navy. Built in the Zhdanov Shipyard with the serial number 721, the cruiser was laid down on 30 November 1966 and launched on 10 February 1968. The flag of the Soviet Navy was hoisted for the first time about the ship on 24 August 1969, and Kronstadt was submitted for government testing on 17 October. She was commissioned on 29 December.

== Career ==
=== 1970s ===
Kronstadt was assigned to the 120th Missile Ship Brigade of the Northern Fleet on 9 March 1970, under the command of Captain Lev Yevdokimov. After completing tests, she was relocated from the Baltic Fleet to the main base of the Black Sea Fleet at Sevastopol from 1 to 20 July. From 15 May to 22 July 1971, she cruised to Severomorsk, the main base of the Northern Fleet, operating in the Mediterranean along the way. Between 17 September and 13 October, Kronstadt observed and monitored the NATO exercise Iron Knight.

From 28 February to 2 April 1972, she participated in the rescue of the crew of Soviet submarine K-19 in the North Atlantic, operating alongside helicopter carrier Leningrad, cruisers Alexander Nevsky and Vitse-Admiral Drozd, submarine tender Magomet Gadzhiyev, guard ship SB-38, and rescue ship Karpaty. During the operation, her air group, led by V.G. Semkin, reportedly distinguished itself. On 25 July, the ship was given a commemorative Red Banner by the Executive Committee of the City Committee of the Communist Party of Sochi. By a 13 December decree of the Presidium of the Soviet Armed Forces, she received a Jubilee Badge of Honor on the 50th anniversary of Communist Party's Central Committee. On the next day, the cruiser's Komsomol organization received a commemorative red banner from the Komsomol Central Committee, and the name of the ship was added to the Northern Fleet Military Council's Book of Honor.

From 11 May to 31 May 1973, Kronstadt participated in exercise Laguna, searching for NATO submarines in the North Atlantic, in conjunction with sister Kresta II-class cruiser Admiral Nakhimov and an anti-submarine warfare group. On 14 May, they detected a potential NATO submarine in the Norwegian Sea, which was tracked until it reached Norwegian territorial waters. During the 19 days of the exercise, she steamed 6,670 nmi (12,350 km; 7,680 mi). On 22 June, Kronstadt made the first SS-N-14 (Metel) launch in the Northern Fleet area, which was assessed as "good". During the year, the cruiser was declared the best in the 120th Missile Ships Brigade. From 10 to 30 September 1974, she operated in the North Atlantic, and participated in the Okean-75 exercise from 16 to 24 April 1975. On 16 June, while maneuvering in the open ocean, the cruiser was damaged after colliding with the Kashin-class destroyer Smyshlennyy. From 12 to 19 July, she steamed to Kronstadt for repairs and modernization. From 8 August 1975 to 9 January 1980, she was repaired and modernized at the Kronstadt Marine Plant as part of the 95th Separate Battalion of Ships undergoing construction or overhaul.

=== 1980s and end of service ===
Kronstadt returned to service in May 1980, arriving at Severomorsk on 21 May and returning to the 120th Missile Ships Brigade. From 9 to 10 July 1981, the cruiser participated in Exercise Sever-81 in the Barents Sea and the Norwegian Sea, along with the battlecruiser Kirov, Kresta II-class cruiser Admiral Isakov and the destroyer Smyshlennyy. On 12 February 1982, she was transferred to the 170th Anti-Submarine Warfare Brigade. On 8 April, Kronstadt was involved in rescue operations for Soviet submarine K-123. However, the ship was forced to return to base early after she suffered engine trouble while leaving Kola Bay.

On 30 December 1982, Kronstadt's Grom-M fire control system was accidentally damaged by flooding. In order to replace her Grom fire control and M-11 Shtorm surface-to-air missile system, she was put in for repairs at SRZ-35 in Murmansk on 9 March 1983. The Grom and Shtorm were flooded and disabled on 11 May 1984, but after repair work she served in the Faroe Islands anti-submarine barrier between 2 September and 13 October. She was not assessed for her performance due to the wounding of a sailor by a fragment of an RG-42 grenade fired by the anti-sabotage detachment. In order to replace her Angara search radar, she put in at SRZ-35 on 1 November 1985. Between 24 and 28 March 1987, Kronstadt participated in a command staff exercise led by fleet commander Admiral of the fleet Ivan Kapitanets alongside Kirov, cruisers Vitse-Admiral Drozd, Marshal Ustinov, Admiral Nakhimov, Admiral Makarov, and Admiral Yumashev, and destroyers Soobrazitelnyy, Otlichnyy, Sovremennyy, and Otchayannyy. On 19 November of that year, while on air defense duty, two shots were accidentally fired from one of its 57 mm AK-725 anti-aircraft guns, without casualties.

Kronstadt was decommissioned on 24 June 1991 due to deterioration of machinery, systems, and a lack of funds for refitting. The ship's ensign was lowered for the last time in September 1992, and her crew was disbanded on 29 October of that year. She was sold to an Indian company for scrapping in 1993.

During her career, Kronstadt was assigned the temporary tactical numbers 585, 544, 535, 273, 298, 662, 647 and 675.

== Commanding officers ==
Kronstadt was commanded by the following officers during her career:

- Captain 3rd rank Lev Yevdokimov (1968–1973)
- Captain 2nd rank Valery Grishanov (1973–1975)
- Captain 2nd rank Yury Krasilovsky (1975–1982)
- Captain 2nd rank Nikolay Melakh (1982–1984)
- Captain 2nd rank Alexander Svetlov (1984–1988)
- Captain 2nd rank Oleg Beselovsky (1988–1989)
- Captain 2nd rank Yury Orudzhev (1989–1991)
