= Soviet cruiser Admiral Isakov =

Soviet Kresta II-class cruiser

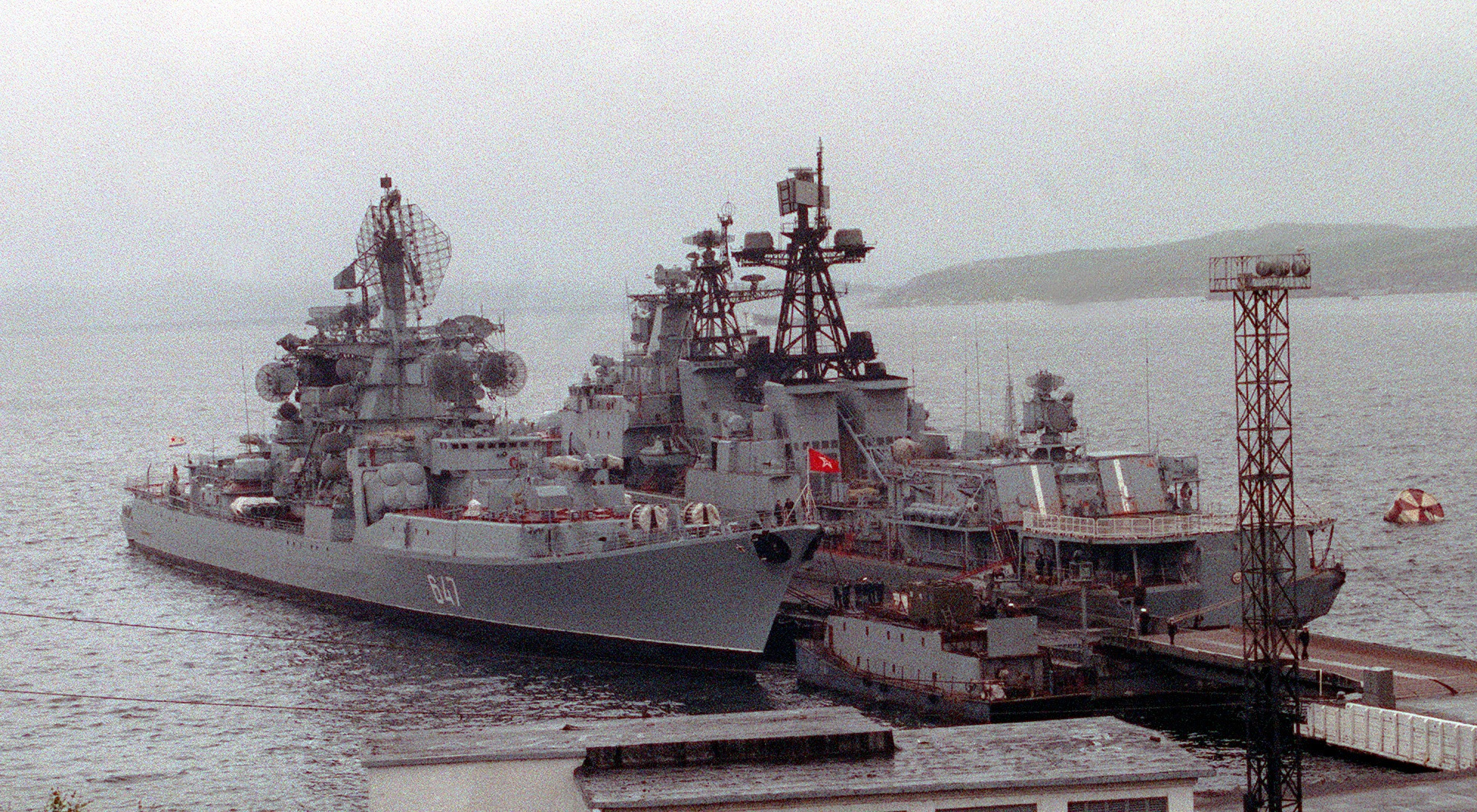
- Admiral Isakov (left) moored at its base in Severomorsk, 1992

History

→ Soviet Union → Russia
- Name: Admiral Isakov
- Namesake: Ivan Isakov
- Builder: Zhdanov Shipyard, Leningrad
- Laid down: 15 January 1968
- Launched: 22 November 1968
- Commissioned: 28 December 1970
- Decommissioned: 30 June 1993
- Fate: Sank under tow for scrapping, 1994

General characteristics
- Class & type: Kresta II-class cruiser
- Displacement: 5,640 tonnes (5,551 long tons) (standard); 7,575 tonnes (7,455 long tons) (full load)
- Length: 156.5 m (513 ft) (o/a)
- Beam: 17.2 m (56 ft)
- Draught: 5.96 m (19.6 ft)
- Installed power: 4 × boilers; 91,000 shp (68,000 kW)
- Propulsion: 2 × shaft steam turbines
- Speed: 34 knots (63 km/h; 39 mph)
- Range: 5,200 nmi (9,600 km; 6,000 mi) at 18 knots (33 km/h; 21 mph)
- Complement: 343
- Sensors & processing systems: Radar; Volga; MR-600 Voskhod; MR-310U Angara M; 2 x 4R60 Grom; 2 x MR-103 Bars; Sonar; MG-332T Titan-2T
- Armament: 2 × quadruple Metel Anti-Ship Complex anti-submarine missiles; 2 × twin M-11 Shtorm surface-to-air missile launchers (72 missiles); 2 × twin 57 mm (2.2 in) AK-725 dual purpose guns; 4 × sextuple 30 mm (1.2 in) AK-630 CIWS; 2 × quintuple 533 mm (21.0 in) torpedo tubes
- Aircraft carried: 1 × Kamov Ka-25 'Hormone-A'
- Aviation facilities: Helicopter deck and hangar

Admiral Isakov (Russian: Адмирал Исаков) was a Kresta II-class cruiser of the Soviet Navy and briefly of the Russian Navy, named for Soviet admiral Ivan Isakov. The second ship of her class, she served mostly during the Cold War from her commissioning in 1970.

Isakov was part of the Northern Fleet throughout her career, often operating in the Atlantic and the Mediterranean to show the flag. She cruised to the Atlantic and the Mediterranean in 1971–72, 1973, and 1975, participating in the large Okean-75 exercise, and underwent a refit between 1977 and 1980. After coming out of refit, the ship participated in the combined arms exercise Shchit-82 and cruised in the Atlantic and Mediterranean during 1982 and 1983, before undergoing another refit between 1986 and 1990. She was decommissioned in 1993 before being sold for scrap due to reduced naval funding, but sank under tow en route to India for scrapping a year later.

== Design ==
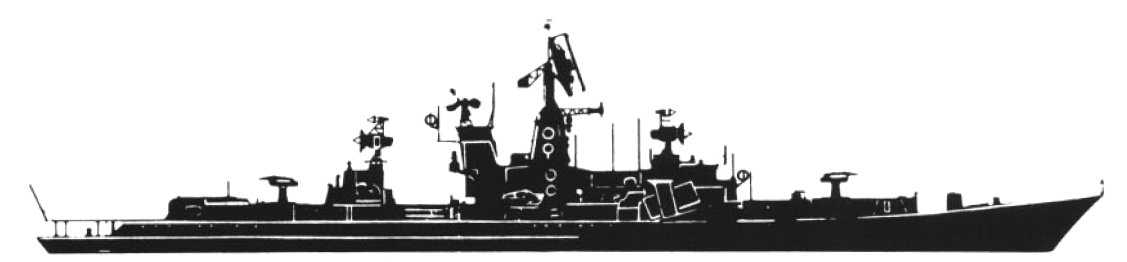
A United States Navy-produced profile drawing of a Kresta II-class cruiser

Admiral Isakov was the second ship of her class of ten Soviet Designation Project 1134A Berkut A (NATO reporting name Kresta II-class) cruisers, designed by Vasily Anikeyev. She was named for Ivan Isakov, a Soviet admiral who commanded naval forces during World War II. The vessels were designated as Large Anti-Submarine Ships and were initially designed with a primary mission of countering NATO ballistic missile submarines, particularly the United States Navy fleet of Polaris-equipped submarines. However, before the ships began to be built, commander-in-chief of the Soviet Navy Admiral Sergey Gorshkov changed the role of the ships to that of destroying NATO attack submarines to allow Soviet Yankee-class ballistic missile submarines to reach the central Atlantic and Pacific, from which the latter could launch their comparatively short-ranged ballistic missiles against targets in the United States.

As a Kresta II-class cruiser, Admiral Isakov was 156.5 metres (513 ft) long overall with a beam of 17.2 m (56 ft) and a draught of 5.96 m (19.6 ft). She displaced 5,640 tonnes (5,551 long tons) standard and 7,575 tonnes (7,455 long tons) full load, and had a complement of 343. The ship was equipped with a hangar aft to carry a single Kamov Ka-25 Hormone-A helicopter.

Admiral Isakov was propelled by two TV-12 steam geared turbines powered by four high-pressure boilers, which created 91,000 shp (68,000 kW), giving her a maximum speed of 34 knots (63 km/h; 39 mph). She had a range of 5,200 nmi (9,600 km; 6,000 mi) at 18 kn (33 km/h; 21 mph) and 1,754.86 nmi (3,250.00 km; 2,019.46 mi) at 32 kn (59 km/h; 37 mph).

=== Armament ===
For her primary role as an anti-submarine cruiser, Admiral Isakov mounted two quadruple launchers for eight anti-submarine missiles in the Metel anti-ship complex (NATO reporting name SS-N-14 Silex). She was also equipped with two RBU-6000 12-barrel and two RBU-1000 6-barrel rocket launchers. The Kamov Ka-25 helicopter embarked on the cruiser was also capable of aiding in the search and destruction of submarines.

To counter aerial threats, Admiral Isakov was armed with a total of four AK-725 57-millimetre (2.2 in) dual-purpose guns in two twin mountings. She also had four 30-millimetre (1.2 in) AK-630 close-in weapon system mountings, and was armed with two twin launchers for the 48 V-611 surface-to-air missiles they carried in the M-11 Shtorm system (NATO reporting name SA-N-3 Goblet). She mounted two quintuple mountings for 533-millimetre (21.0 in) dual-role torpedoes.

=== Sensors ===
Admiral Isakov was equipped with the MR-600 Voskhod (NATO code name Top Sail) early warning air search radar, the MR-310U Angara-M (NATO code name Head Net C) search radar, and the Volga (NATO code names Don Kay and Don-2) navigational radar. For anti-submarine warfare she had improved MG-332T Titan-2T hull-mounted sonar. She had two Grom (SA-N-1) and two MR-103 Bars (AK-725) fire-control systems. Admiral Isakov also had a MG-26 communications outfit. As one of the first four ships in her class, Admiral Isakov lacked a Vympel fire-control radar, and relied on manual targeting for the AK-630.

Her electronic warfare equipment included the MRP-15-16 Zaliv and two sets each of the MRP-11-12 and MRP-13-14 direction finding systems, as well as the MRP-150 Gurzuf A and MRP-152 Gurzuf B radar jamming devices.

== Construction and career ==
On 29 December 1967, Admiral Isakov was added to the list of ships of the Soviet Navy. Built in the Zhdanov Shipyard at Leningrad with the serial number 722, the cruiser was laid down on 15 January 1968 and launched on 22 November of that year. The flag of the Soviet Navy was hoisted for the first time about the ship on 16 August 1970, and Admiral Isakov was submitted for government testing in the Baltic on 9 September; the sea trials concluded uneventfully on 11 December. She was commissioned on 28 December after being handed over to the Navy on 13 December.

=== 1970s ===
Admiral Isakov was assigned to the Northern Fleet on 16 January 1971, under the command of Captain Lyudvig Agadzhanov. She began her voyage to the fleet in April after receiving ammunition and completing other preparatory tasks, suffering a boiler malfunction in the Norwegian Sea on 19 April. Upon arrival in Severomorsk on 22 April, she became part of the 120th Missile Ship Brigade of the Northern Fleet's 7th Operational Squadron. Admiral Isakov shadowed a United States Navy carrier group in the Norwegian and Barents Seas between 11 August and 21 September. On 13 December she departed for a Mediterranean cruise, calling at Annaba to show the flag between 12 and 17 February. After a period at Sevastopol for repairs from 5 March 1972, she returned to Severomorsk on 24 June, despite a boiler failure on 13 June while crossing the Norwegian Sea. First Deputy Commander-in-Chief of the Navy Admiral of the Fleet Vladimir Kasatonov visited the ship on 6 March 1973.

Having begun another Atlantic cruise on 22 March that would last until 24 November, Admiral Isakov participated in Exercise Laguna, tracking possible NATO submarine movements in the North Atlantic alongside Kresta I-class missile cruiser Sevastopol and her sister ship Admiral Makarov between 12 and 29 May. During the exercise, a NATO submarine was detected during the exercise, and the crew of her Ka-25 made their first night landing on a moving ship. With the Kanin-class destroyer Derzky, she visited Havana between 4 August and 15 October. After participating in Exercise Okean-75 in April 1975, she operated in the Central Atlantic and Mediterranean with the missile cruiser Admiral Zozulya between 1 June and 1 December, visiting Annaba from 31 July to 4 August.

Between August and October 1976, Admiral Isakov escorted the aircraft cruiser Kiev during tests of the latter's main missile systems off Kolguyev Island. In difficult weather, Isakov sailed to the Lofoten Islands with the Kashin-class destroyer Smyshlyony and the oiler Genrikh Gasanov during the April 1977 Exercise Sever-77. Between June 1977 and April 1980, she underwent repairs and modernization at the SRZ-35 shipyard in Murmansk, which included the addition of jet blast deflectors under the barrels of the V-611 missiles of the Shtorm system.

=== 1980s and end of service ===
After the completion of her refit, Admiral Isakov conducted combat training in the Barents and Norwegian Seas, near the Lofoten and Faroe Islands. On 27 May 1981 she deliberately rammed the British destroyer HMS Glasgow in the Barents Sea while the latter was collecting intelligence. The damage aboard Glasgow was minor, after the British captain matched his speed with that of Admiral Isakov. Escorting the battlecruiser Kirov along with her sister Kronstadt and the destroyers Smyshlyony and Stroyny, she participated in Exercise Sever-81 between 9 and 10 July. The cruiser was transferred to the 170th Anti-Submarine Warfare Brigade on 12 February 1982.

Admiral Isakov once again cruised into the Atlantic and the Mediterranean between 27 July and 2 October 1982, beginning with anti-submarine Exercise Natyag in the Greenland Sea and passed Jan Mayen on 1 August. After participating in Exercise Atoll from 6 to 8 August, she escorted Kiev during Exercise Shchit-82 from 25 September to 1 October. Following repairs at Sevastopol, Admiral Isakov, under the flag of Northern Fleet First Deputy Commander Vice Admiral Vladimir Kruglikov, steamed westwards alongside the frigate Rezvyy and Genrikh Gasanov. She visited Havana and Cienfuegos between 2 and 10 December 1982 before returning to Severomorsk on 21 February 1983. During the voyage, on 16 January, the Soviet group came within 50 miles of the Mississippi River Delta. She escorted the aircraft cruiser Novorossiysk during the latter's voyage to the Pacific to the latitude of Gibraltar in October, with the destroyers Otchayanny, Udaloy, and the oiler Genrikh Gasanov.

Before participating in command staff Exercise Atlantika-84 from 31 March to 4 April 1984, the cruiser suffered a partial flooding of her ammunition storage while preparing for the exercise on 20 February. She underwent a mid-career refit at SRZ-35 between 9 October 1986 and 27 August 1990, receiving updated Rastrub-B missiles for her Metel, the Shlyuz satellite navigation system and the Tsunami-BM satellite communications system. On 1 October 1991, the 170th Brigade was redesignated as the 44th Anti-Submarine Warfare Division.

After the dissolution of the Soviet Union, Admiral Isakov was transferred to the Russian Navy. Due to reduced naval funding she was decommissioned on 30 June 1993, crew disbanding on 31 December; the naval jack was lowered for the last time on 14 January 1994. In mid-1994, the ship was sold to an Indian company for scrapping, but sank under tow en route.

During her career, Admiral Isakov was assigned the temporary tactical numbers 587, 251, 298, 550, 549, 647 (from 1990), and 672.
