= Kresta II-class cruiser =

Soviet guided missile cruisers ship class

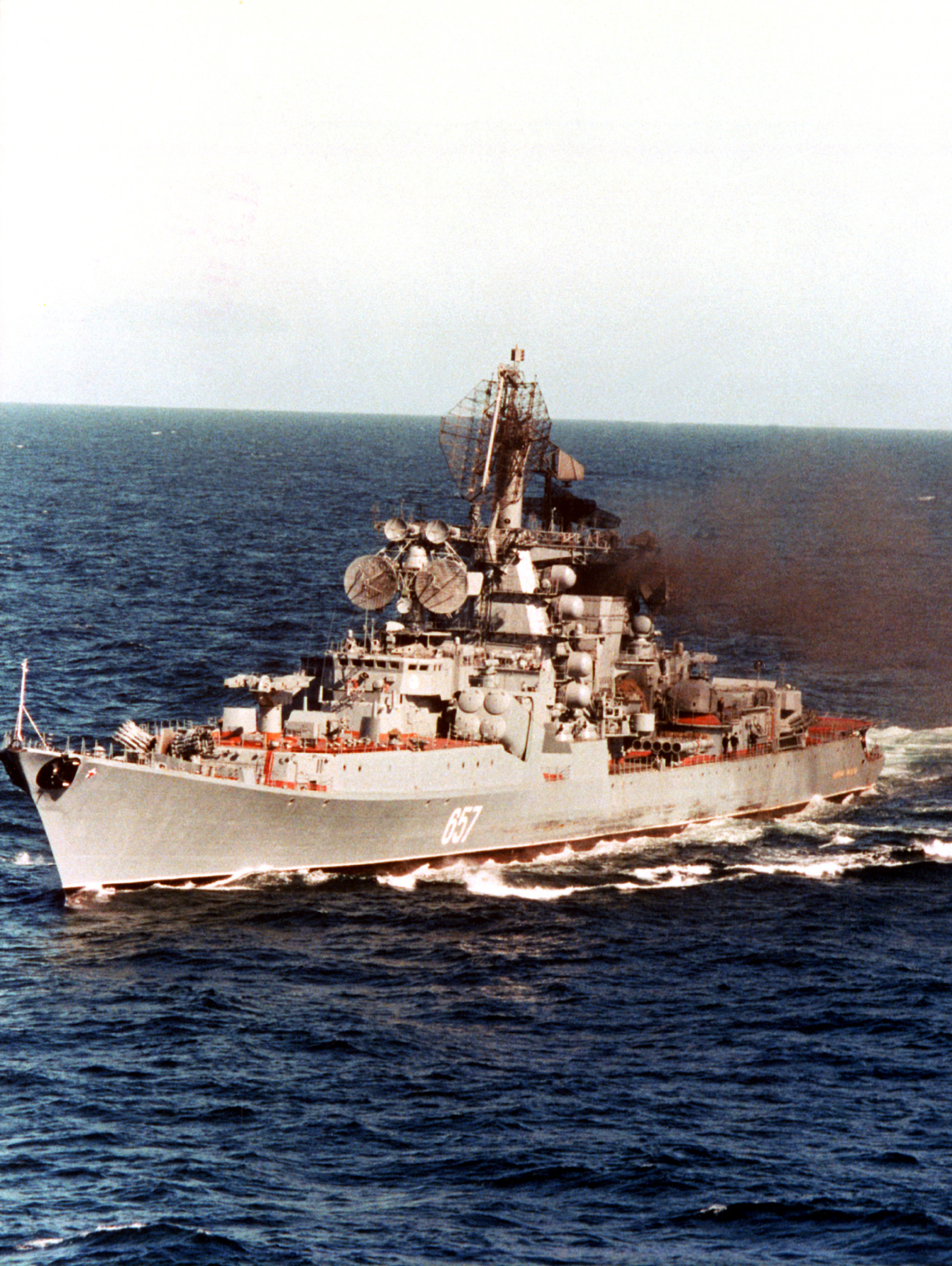
- Admiral Yumashev in 1989

Class overview
- Name: Kresta II class
- Builders: Zhdanov Shipyard, Leningrad
- Operators: Soviet Navy; Russian Navy
- Preceded by: Kresta I class
- Succeeded by: Kara class
- Built: 1966–1977
- In commission: 1969–1993
- Completed: 10
- Retired: 10

General characteristics
- Type: Guided missile cruiser
- Displacement: 5,600 tons standard; 7,535 tons full load
- Length: 159 m (522 ft)
- Beam: 17 m (56 ft)
- Draught: 6 m (20 ft)
- Propulsion: 2 shaft steam turbines, 4 boilers; 91,000–100,000 shp (68–75 MW)
- Speed: 34 kn (63 km/h; 39 mph)
- Range: 10,500 nmi (19,400 km; 12,100 mi) at 14 kn (26 km/h; 16 mph); 5,200 nmi (9,600 km; 6,000 mi) at 18 kn (33 km/h; 21 mph)
- Endurance: 1830 tons fuel oil
- Complement: 380
- Sensors & processing systems: Radar; Don Kay, Don-2, Top Sail, Head Net 2 x Head Lights 2 x Muff Cob, 2 x Bass Tilt, Sonar; Bull Nose
- Armament: 2 × quad SS-N-14 'Silex' anti-submarine missiles; 2 × twin SA-N-3 'Goblet' surface-to-air missile launchers (48 missiles); 2 × twin 57-mm/70-cal AK-725 anti-aircraft guns; 4 × 30mm AK-630 CIWS; 2 × quintuple 533mm torpedo tubes; 2 x RBU-6000 12-barrel anti-submarine rocket launchers; 2 x RBU-1000 6-barrel anti-submarine rocket launchers
- Aircraft carried: 1 × Ka-25 series helicopter
- Aviation facilities: Helipad and hangar

The Kresta II class, Soviet designation Project 1134A Berkut A (golden eagle), was a class of guided missile cruiser (large anti-submarine warfare ship in Soviet classification) built by the Soviet Union for the Soviet Navy. The NATO lists the class as "cruisers" mainly due to the Metel (SS-N-14 Silex) anti-ship missile system capable to strike not only submarines but also surface vessels. They were succeeded by the larger Kara class cruisers.

== Design ==
The Kresta II class was an anti-submarine derivative of the Kresta I-class cruiser, and were armed with a new anti-submarine missile (SS-N-14), new surface-to-air missiles (SA-N-3) and advanced sonar. Conway's states that the first three ships were to have been armed with the SS-N-9 anti-ship missile but Soviet naval doctrine changed with greater emphasis on anti-submarine warfare. The surface-to-air missiles comprised more advanced SA-N-3 missiles with two twin launchers. New 3D search radar and new fire control radars were also fitted. 4 30mm CIWS guns were also fitted for improved anti-missile defence. A more advanced sonar led to the bow being more sharply raked. The machinery suite comprised two TV-12 steam turbines with high-pressure boilers, identical to the Kresta I class.

=== General characteristics ===
The Kresta II-class cruisers were 158.5 metres (520 ft) long with a beam of 16.9 m (55 ft) and a draught of 6 m (20 ft). They displaced 6000 tons standard and 7800 full load. They had a complement of 380-400 and were equipped with a hangar aft to stow away a Kamov Ka-25 Hormone-A helicopter.

Kresta II-class vessels were propelled by two TV-12 steam geared turbines powered by four high pressure boilers which created 75,000 kilowatts (101,000 hp). This gave the cruisers a maximum speed of 34 knots (63 km/h; 39 mph). They had a range of 10,500 nautical miles (19,400 km; 12,100 mi) at 14 knots (26 km/h; 16 mph) and 5,200 nmi (9,600 km; 6,000 mi) at 18 kn (33 km/h; 21 mph).

=== Armament ===
For their primary role as anti-submarine cruisers, the Kresta II class mounted two quadruple launchers for eight SS-N-14 anti-submarine missiles. They were also equipped with two RBU 6000 12-barrel and two RBU 1000 6-barrel rocket launchers. The Ka-25 helicopter embarked on the cruiser was also capable of aiding in the search and destruction of submarines.

Against aerial threats the cruisers were armed with four 57mm L/80 DP guns situated in two twin mountings. They also had four 30mm AK-630 CIWS mountings. They were armed with two twin launchers for the 48 SA-N-3 surface-to-air missiles they carried.

The ships also mounted two quintuple mountings for 533 mm (21.0 in) dual-role torpedoes.

=== Sensors ===
The Kresta II class were equipped with MR600 air search radar MR-310 Angara Don navigational and Volga navigational radars. For anti-submarine warfare they had MG-322 hull mounted sonar. For fire control purposes they had Grom SA-N-3 fire control, MR103 AK725 fire control and Drakon RP33 fire control. They also had an MG-26 communications outfit and an MG-35 Shtil.

The first four ships of the class to be completed were not equipped with the MR-123 Vympel fire control radar for the AK-630, and relied on manual targeting instead.

== Ships ==
All the ships were built by the Zhdanov Shipyard in Leningrad.

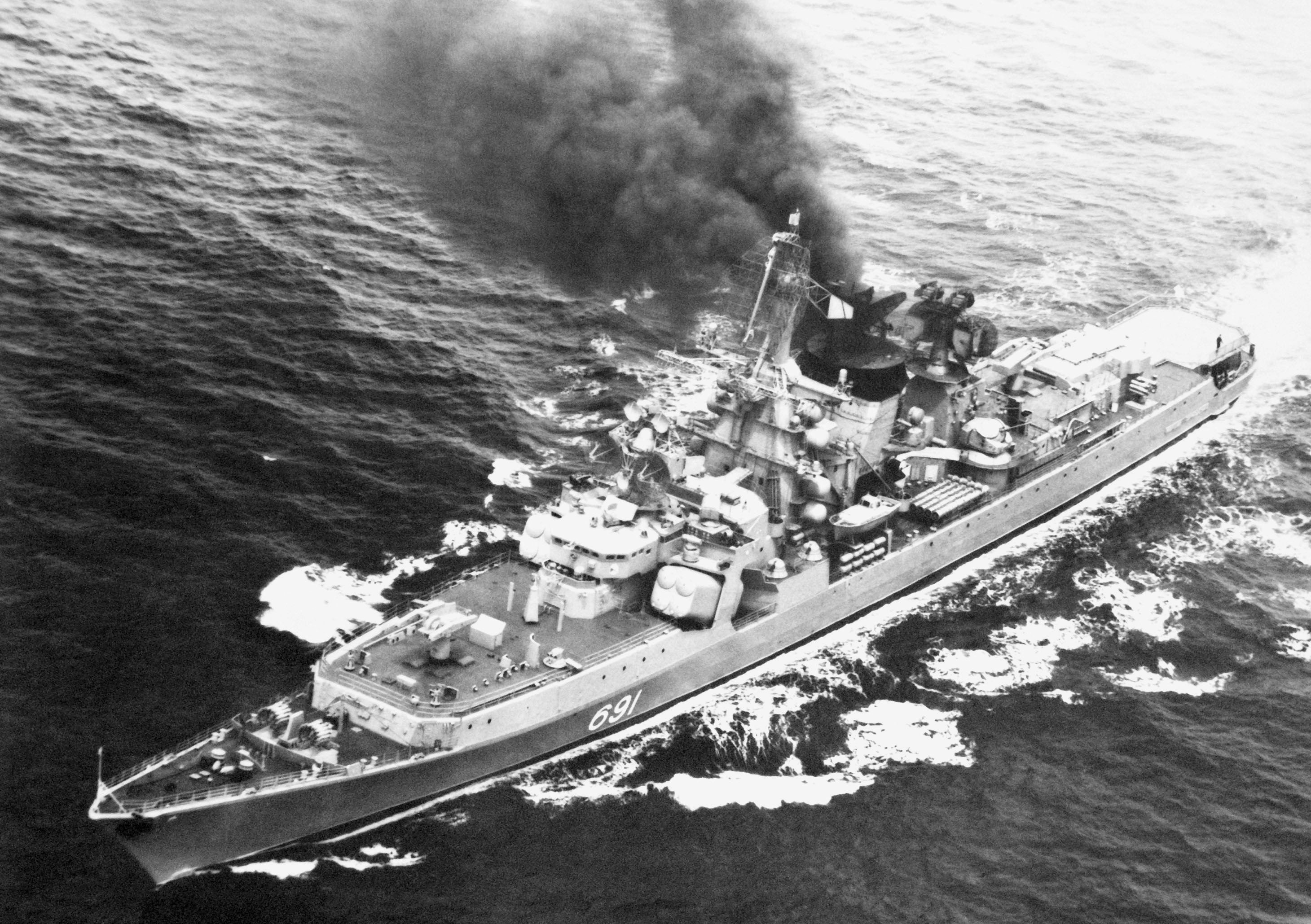
Cruiser Marshal Timoshenko in 1986

Name	Russian	Namesake	Laid down	Launched	Commissioned	Decommissioned
Kronstadt	Кронштадт	City of Kronstadt	30 November 1966	10 February 1968	29 December 1969	24 June 1991
Admiral Isakov	Адмирал Исаков	Ivan Isakov	15 January 1968	22 November 1968	28 December 1970	30 June 1993
Admiral Nakhimov	Адмирал Нахимов	Pavel Nakhimov	15 January 1968	15 April 1969	29 November 1971	31 January 1991
Admiral Makarov	Адмирал Макаров	Stepan Makarov	23 February 1969	22 November 1970	25 October 1972	3 July 1992
Khabarovsk (ex-Marshal Voroshilov)	Хаба́ровск (Маршал Ворошилов)	City of Khabarovsk (Kliment Voroshilov)	20 March 1970	8 October 1970	15 September 1973	3 July 1992
Admiral Oktyabrsky	Адмирал Октябьский	Filipp Oktyabrskiy	2 June 1969	21 May 1971	28 December 1973	30 June 1993
Admiral Isachenkov	Адмирал Исаченков	Nikolai Isachenkov	30 October 1970	28 March 1972	5 November 1974	3 July 1992
Marshal Timoshenko	Маршал Тимошенко	Semyon Timoshenko	2 November 1972	21 October 1973	25 November 1975	3 July 1992
Vasily Chapayev	Василий Чапаев	Vasily Chapayev	22 November 1973	28 November 1974	30 November 1976	30 June 1993
Admiral Yumashev	Адмирал Юмашев	Ivan Yumashev	17 April 1975	30 September 1977	30 December 1977	13 July 1992

== See also ==
- List of ships of the Soviet Navy
- List of ships of Russia by project number
