= Soviet cruiser Vitse-Admiral Drozd =

Naval ship commissioned in 1968

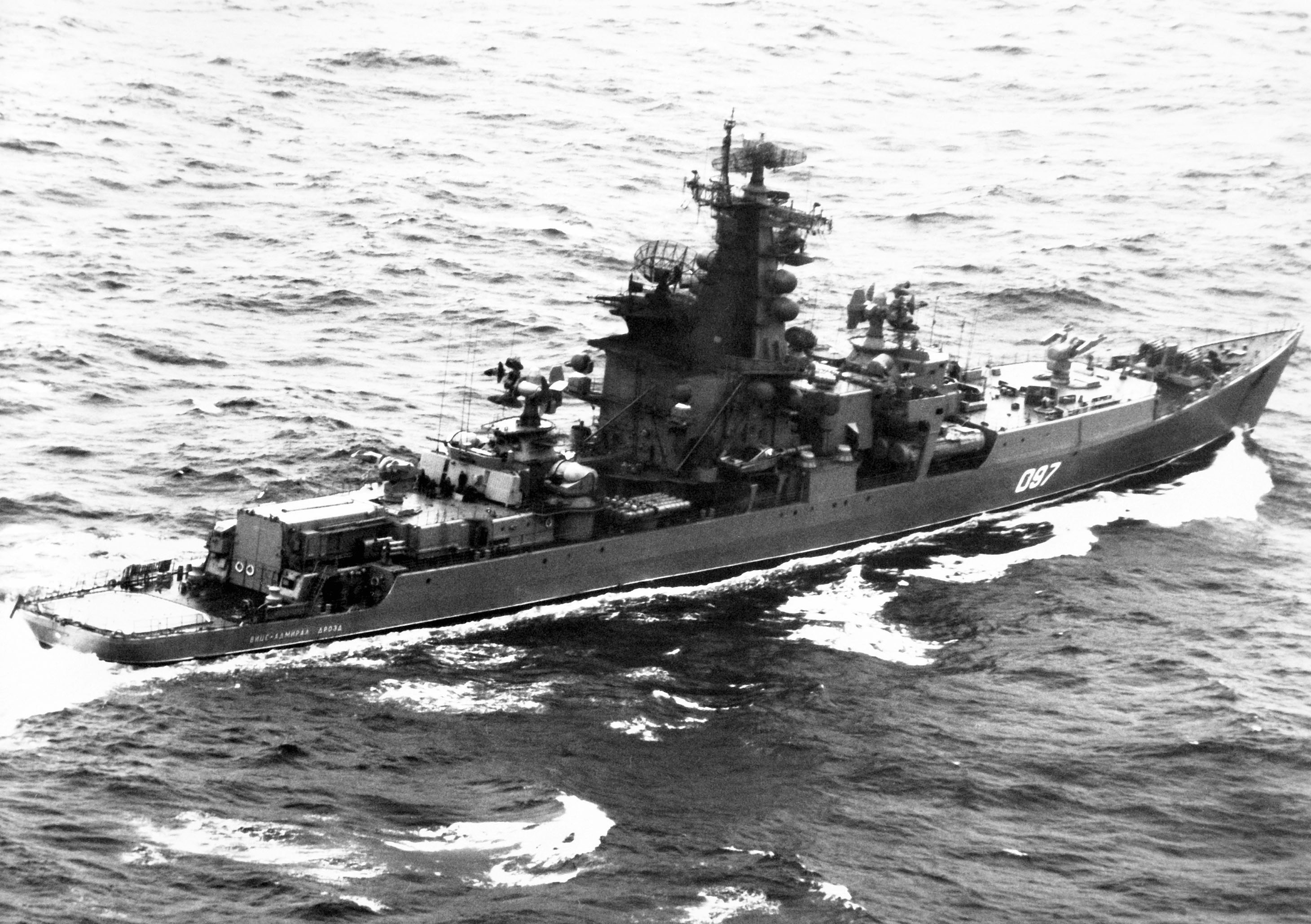
- Vitse-Admiral Drozd underway, 6 March 1986

History

Russia
- Name: Vitse-Admiral Drozd; (Вице-адмирал Дрозд)
- Namesake: Valentin Drozd
- Builder: A.A. Zhdanov, Leningrad
- Yard number: 793
- Laid down: 26 October 1965
- Launched: 18 November 1966
- Commissioned: 27 December 1968
- Decommissioned: 1 July 1990
- Fate: Sunk on the way to the broken up, March 1992

General characteristics
- Class & type: Berkut-class cruiser
- Displacement: 5,340 t (5,260 long tons) (standard); 7,170 t (7,060 long tons) (full load)
- Length: 156.2 m (512 ft 6 in)
- Beam: 16.2 m (53 ft 2 in)
- Draught: 5.5 m (18 ft 1 in)
- Installed power: 4 × boilers; 46,000 shp (34,000 kW)
- Propulsion: 2 × shafts, 2 steam turbines
- Speed: 34 knots (63 km/h; 39 mph)
- Range: 10,500 nmi (19,400 km; 12,100 mi) at 14 knots (26 km/h; 16 mph)
- Complement: 312
- Sensors & processing systems: 1 × MR-500 Kliver early-warning radar; 1 × MR-310 Angara search radar; 1 × Binom-1134, 2 × 4R90 Yatagan, 2 × MR-103 Bars fire-control radars; 1 × MG-312M Titan sonar
- Armament: 2 × twin 4K44 (SS-N-3 'Shaddock’) anti-ship missiles; 2 × twin M-1 Volna-M (SA-N-1 'Goa') surface-to-air missile launchers (64 missiles); 2 × twin 57 mm (2.2 in) AA guns; 2 × RBU-1000 anti-submarine rocket launchers; 2 × RBU-6000 anti-submarine rocket launchers; 2 × quintuple 533 mm (21 in) torpedo tubes
- Aircraft carried: 1 Kamov Ka-25T 'Hormone-B' helicopter
- Aviation facilities: Hangar and helipad

Vitse-Admiral Drozd (Russian: Вице-адмирал Дрозд) was the third ship of the Project 1134 Berkut Large Anti-submarine Ships (Russian: Большой Противолодочный Корабль, BPK) built for the Soviet Navy, also known as the 'Kresta I'-class or Admiral Zozulya-class guided missile cruisers. The vessel was commissioned in 1968 and served with the Baltic and Northern Fleets through the 1970s and 1980s. As well as taking part in naval exercises in the Atlantic, the ship assisted in the rescue of the crew of the stricken submarine K-19 in 1972. As a consequence, the ship was named in the Northern Fleet's book of honour. The vessel was reclassified a Large Rocket Ship (Russian: Ракетные крейсера проекта, RKR) in 1977 to reflect its multi-purpose capability. After an upgrade in 1981, Vitse-Admiral Drozd continued to operate in the Mediterranean Sea and Atlantic Ocean. The vessel observed the 1986 United States bombing of Libya and undertook good will visits to Annaba, Algeria, and Dubrovnik, Yugoslavia, as well as Tripoli and Tobruk. After being decommissioned in 1990, the ship was sent to India to be broken up in 1992 but sank en route.

== Design and development ==
=== Design ===
Vitse-Admiral Drozd was the third of four Project 1134 Berkut-class ships (NATO reporting name 'Kresta I' cruisers) for the Soviet Navy, also known as the Admiral Zozulya-class after the lead ship. The class was approved by Nikita Khrushchev as part of Sergey Gorshkov's buildup of the navy and envisioned as a more balanced follow-on to the specialist Project 58 and Project 61 classes, combining the attributes of both in a single hull. The ships mounted a primary armament of long-range missiles designed for attacking US Navy carrier battle groups. The members of the class were initially designated Large Anti-submarine Ships (Russian: Большой Противолодочный Корабль or BPK) by the Soviet Navy but this was changed to Large Rocket Ships (Russian: Ракетные крейсера проекта, RKR) in 1977 to reflect their wider role.

The vessel displaced 5,340 tonnes (5,260 long tons) standard and 7,170 tonnes (7,060 long tons) at full load, and was 156.2 m (512 ft) in overall length. (Note: NATO estimates vary. For example, the US Navy quoted 6,140 tons standard displacement, 7,600 tons full load and 155.6 m length.) Beam was 16.2 m (53 ft 2 in) on the waterline and average draught was 5.5 m (18 ft 1 in). Power was provided by two TV-12 steam turbines, fuelled by four KVN-98/64 high pressure boilers and driving two screws that provided 46,000 shaft horsepower (34,000 kW). Maximum design speed was 34 knots (63 km/h; 39 mph). The ship carried 1,690 t (1,660 long tons) of fuel oil, which gave a range of 10,500 nautical miles (19,446 km; 12,083 mi) at 14 knots (26 km/h; 16 mph). Electricity was provided by a TD-760 driven off steam drawn from the main boilers which powered a 380 V AC circuit at a frequency of 50 Hz. The ship's complement was 30 officers and 282 ratings.

=== Armament ===
For the anti-surface warfare role, Vitse-Admiral Drozd was originally intended to mount the P-500 Bazalt (NATO reporting name SS-N-12 'Sandbox') missile, but protracted development meant that instead the same 4K44 missiles (NATO reporting name SS-N-3 'Shaddock') as carried by the Project 58 warships were mounted, although they were launched from two specially designed twin KT-35-1134 P-35 launchers carried midships. The missiles could each carry a 900 kg (2,000 lb) warhead over a range in excess of 500 kilometres (310 mi; 270 nmi). A landing pad and hangar was fitted aft for a ranging Kamov Ka-25T helicopter (NATO reporting name 'Hormone-B') to enable mid-course guidance.

Anti-aircraft defence was to be based around the new M-11 Shtorm (NATO reporting name SA-N-3 'Goblet') system but this did not become operational until 1969. Instead, protection was enhanced by mounting two twin ZIF-102 M-1 Volna-M launchers, one forward and the other aft, and up to 64 4K91 (NATO reporting name SA-N-1 'Goa') surface to air missiles, which was supplemented by two twin 57 mm (2 in) AK-725-MP-103 guns mounted on the aft superstructure. Defence against submarines was provided by two quintuple 533 mm (21 in) PTA-53-1134 torpedo launchers, a pair of six-barrelled RBU-1000 Smerch-3 launchers for 300 mm (11.8 in) anti-submarine rockets and a pair of twelve-barrelled RBU-6000 Smerch-2 launchers for 213 mm (8.4 in) anti-submarine rockets.

Between January 1980 and March 1983, the ship was upgraded with four six-barrel 30 mm (1 in) AK-630 close-in weapon systems, with their attendant fire control radars, installed near the bridge to improve anti-missile defence.

=== Electronic warfare ===
Vitse-Admiral Drozd was equipped with the MR-500 Kliver (NATO reporting name 'Top Sail') early-warning radar, supported by a MR-310 Angara (NATO reporting name 'Head Net C') search radar, and one Volna (NATO reporting name 'Don Kay') navigational radar. The MR-310 was a 3D radar that could detect aircraft out to 150 km (93 mi). For fire-control purposes the vessel had Binom-1134 for the surface-to-surface missiles. Guidance for the surface-to-air missiles was provided by two 4R90 Yatagan radars and with MR-103 Bars radars supporting the AK-725 guns, complemented by a single ARP-50R radio direction finder. The ship carried three Nickel-KM and two Khrom-KM IFF systems.

The ship's electronic warfare equipment included the MRP-15-16 Zaliv and two sets each of the MRP-11-12 and MRP-13-14 direction-finding systems, as well as the MRP-150 Gurzuf A and MRP-152 Gurzuf B radar-jamming devices. Threat response was coordinated with a Planshet-1134 combat information control system. A ZIF-121 launcher for PK-2 decoy rockets was carried.

For anti-submarine warfare, the vessel was designed to be fitted with the improved GAS MG-332T Titan-2 hull-mounted sonar, but this was not ready in time to be included in the construction and so the MS-312M Titan was fitted instead, in a retractable bulbous radome. A single GAS MG-31 sonar was also fitted for detecting mines. The MG-26 Khosta underwater communication system and both MI-110R and MI-110K anti-submarine search stations were carried.

== Construction and career ==
Laid down on 26 October 1965 at A.A. Zhdanov in Leningrad with yard number 793, Vitse-Admiral Drozd was launched on 18 November 1966. The total cost of construction was 32 million rubles. The vessel was named in honour of Vice-Admiral Valentin Drozd. Commissioned on 27 December 1968, Vitse-Admiral Drozd joined the Baltic Fleet as part of the 120th Missile Ship Brigade (Russian: бригада ракетных кораблей) on 5 May 1969. After operating in the Northern Atlantic Ocean between 4 and 16 June, covering a distance of 3,792 nautical miles (7,023 km; 4,364 mi), the ship took part in the naval exercises Kolskiy Bereg between 12 and 15 August 1969 and Okean-70 between 10 March and 22 April 1970, followed by cruises in the Norwegian Sea. Between 14 and 25 May 1970, the vessel visited Cienfuegos, Cuba.

The following year saw Vitse-Admiral Drozd on deployment in the North Atlantic Ocean, Gulf of Mexico, Caribbean Sea and the Mediterranean Sea, including another visit to Cuba between 9 and 25 February. On 13 April, while undertaking reconnaissance off the north-east coast of Ireland, the warship identified and successfully tracked an unknown submarine, maintaining contact for 8 hours and 54 minutes. During this period, the ship operated the onboard helicopter for the first time and monitored NATO exercises near the Faroe Islands. Between 14 December and 23 March the following year, the ship sailed in the central Atlantic Ocean, spending time in Conakry, Guinea, between 6 and 12 January. The ship cruised for 16,616 nautical miles (30,773 km; 19,121 mi). Vitse-Admiral Drozd crossed the equator for the first time on 14 or 17 February 1972, but returned to the Bay of Biscay to take part in the rescue operation for the Project 658 submarine K-19 between 3 and 20 March. The submarine surfaced after a fire broke out on 24 February, killing 28 sailors. Vitse-Admiral Drozd evacuated the survivors, leaving a skeleton crew to bring the boat to port. The crew was honoured for the action, with Captain V. G. Proskuryakov and Lieutenant V. V. Kondrashov both receiving the Order of the Red Star and the ship named in the Northern Fleet's book of honour on 10 December.

Between 3 September and 3 October 1972, the ship undertook anti-submarine patrols off the Faroe Islands. After repairs and modernization at the A.A. Zhdanov Yard in Leningrad which took the ship out of action between January 1973 and February 1975, Vitse-Admiral Drozd sailed with Project 1134A Berkut A large anti-submarine ship Admiral Isachenkov from Liepāja to Severomorsk. On 8 April, the warship was formally transferred to the Northern Fleet. Between 2 January and 4 July 1976, Vitse-Admiral Drozd served on anti-submarine exercises, including Krym-76, in the central Atlantic Ocean and Mediterranean Sea, covering 26,517 nautical miles (49,109 km; 30,515 mi), including visiting Annaba, Algeria, twice. For this service, the vessel was named the best surface ship of the Northern Fleet and presented with the banner of the Military Council of the Northern Fleet. Between 2 September and 2 October 1977, the vessel observed the NATO exercise Strong Express.

On 20 June 1980, the ship's keel was damaged in an accident with Project 670 submarine K-508, which was repaired as part of a refit and upgrade that took place at Kronshtadt between 10 January 1981 and March 1984. The ship was back in Severomorsk on 10 May 1984, but spent the between 15 January and 4 June 1985 operating in the Mediterranean Sea as part of a task force led by the aircraft carrier Kiev alongside the Project 1134A Berkut A warship Marshal Timoshenko. The deployment included a visit to Dubrovnik, Yugoslavia, from 9 to 13 May. The vessel returned to the Mediterranean between 20 January and 18 June 1986 as part of a detachment from the Northern Fleet. The ship observed the United States Sixth Fleet operating in the Gulf of Sidra. On 24 March the Sixth Fleet engaged with Libyan Armed Forces, which escalated to, on 15 April, the United States bombing of Libya. Vitse-Admiral Drozd entered Tripoli harbour after the attack as a symbol of solidarity with the Libyan government, and also undertook a good will visit to Tobruk. After over 20 years of service, the ship was decommissioned on 1 July 1990. The flag was lowered on 2 June 1991 and, in March 1992, Vitse-Admiral Drozd sank while being towed to India to be broken up.

During the vessel's career, Vitse-Admiral Drozd was assigned the temporary tactical numbers 553, 583, 592, 298, 299, 548, 560, 097, 054 and 068.
