= Soviet cruiser Sevastopol =

Soviet Kresta I-class cruiser

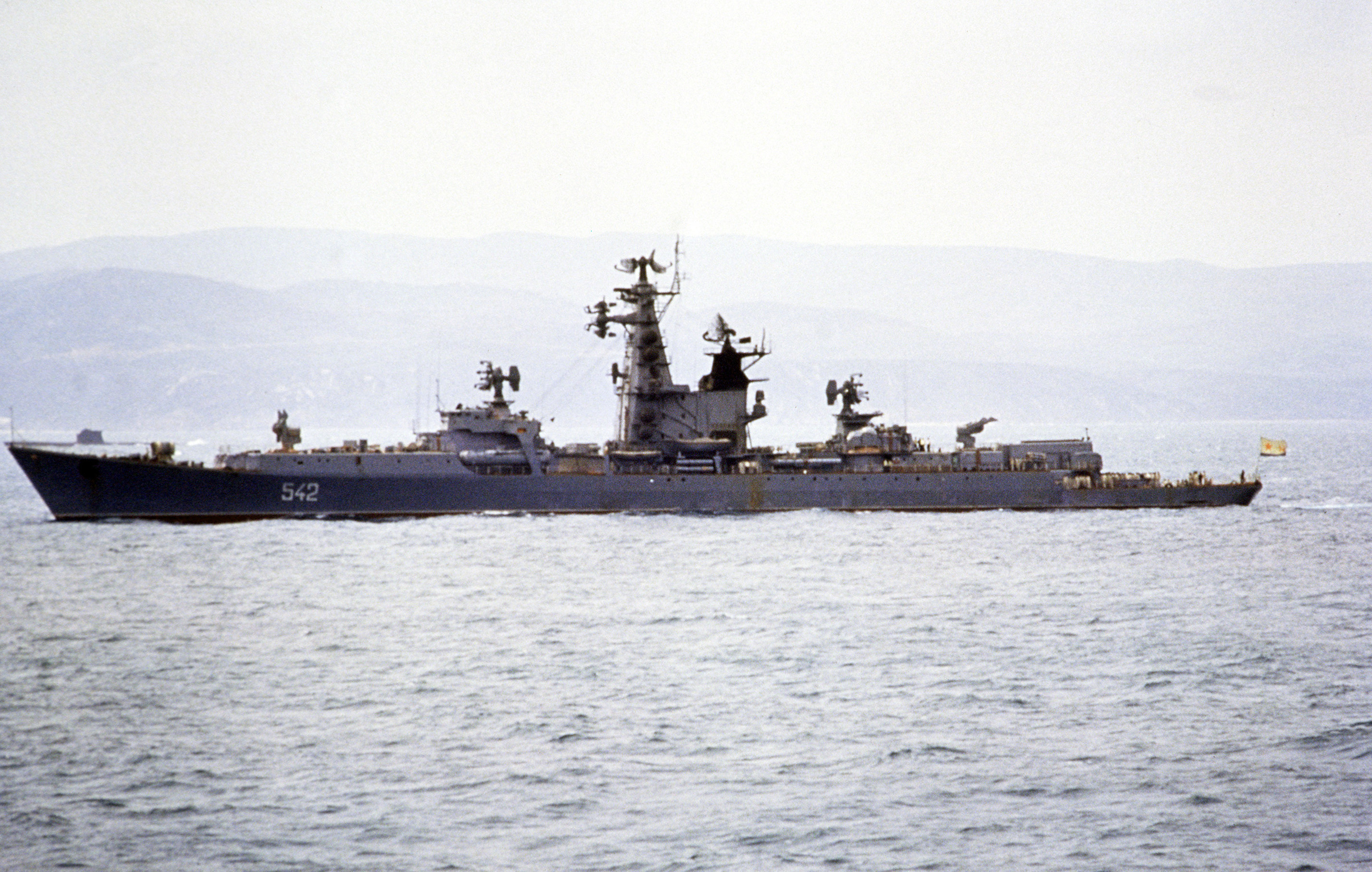
- Kresta I-class cruiser

History

Russia
- Name: Sevastopol; (Севастополь)
- Namesake: Sevastopol
- Builder: A.A. Zhdanov, Leningrad
- Yard number: 794
- Laid down: 8 June 1966
- Launched: 28 April 1967
- Commissioned: 25 September 1969
- Decommissioned: 15 December 1989
- Identification: See Pennant numbers
- Fate: Scrapped

General characteristics
- Class & type: Kresta I-class cruiser
- Displacement: 5,340 tonnes (5,256 long tons) standard; 7,170 tonnes (7,057 long tons) full load
- Length: 156.2 m (512 ft 6 in)
- Beam: 16.8 m (55 ft 1 in)
- Draught: 5.6 m (18 ft 4 in)
- Propulsion: 2 x shaft; 4 x KVN-98/64 boilers; 2 x TV-12 GTZA steam turbines, 46,000 shp (34,000 kW)
- Speed: 34 knots (63 km/h)
- Range: 10,500 nmi (19,446 km) at 14 knots (26 km/h)
- Complement: 30 officers, 282 ratings
- Sensors & processing systems: 1 x MR-500; 1 x MR-310 Angara-A air/surface search radars; 1 x MRP-11-12; 2 x MRP-13-14 Uspekh-U; 1 x MRP-15-16 Zaliv reconnaissance radars; 1 x Volga navigation radar; 1 x Binom-1134; 2 x 4R90 Yatagan; 1 x MR-103 Bars; 1 x Grozna-1134; 1 x Burya-1134 fire control systems; 3 x Nickel-KM; 2 x Khrom-KM IFF; 1 x ARP-50R radio direction finder; 1 x MG-312M Titan; 1 x GAS-311 Vychegda sonars; 1 x MG-26 Khosta underwater communication system; 1 x MI-110R; 1 x MI-110K anti-subrmarine search stations; 1 x Planshet-1134 combat information control systems
- Electronic warfare & decoys: 2 x Gurzuf ESM radar system; 1 x ZIF-121 launcher for PK-2 decoy rockets
- Armament: 4 × KT-35-1134 P-35 launchers; 4 x 4K44 (SS-N-3 'Shaddock’) anti-ship missiles (2x2); 4 × ZIF-102 M-1 launchers with 64 V-600 (SA-N-1 ‘Goa’) surface to air missiles (2x2); 4 × 57 mm (2 in) AK-725 guns (2×2); 2 × RBU-1000 Smerch-3 Anti-Submarine rockets; 2 × RBU-6000 Smerch-2 Anti-Submarine rockets; 2 × quintuple 533 mm (21 in) PTA-53-1134 torpedo tubes; 10 x 53-65, 53-65K or SET-65 torpedoes
- Aircraft carried: 1 Kamov Ka-25 'Hormone-A' or KA-25T 'Hormone-B'
- Aviation facilities: Hangar and helipad

Sevastopol was a Kresta I-class cruiser of the Soviet Navy.

== Construction and career ==
The ship was built at A.A. Zhdanov in Leningrad and was launched on 28 April 1967 and commissioned on 25 September 1969.

She was decommissioned on 15 December 1989 and sold for scrap.

=== Pennant numbers ===
Date	Pennant number
1969	590
1970	542
1971	555
1974	544
	293
1980	056
1980	048
1981	032
1984	026
1987	017
1989	033

== See also ==
- Cruiser
- Kresta I-class cruiser
- List of ships of the Soviet Navy
- List of ships of Russia by project number
