= Metel Anti-Ship Complex =

RPK-3 Metel (NATO reporting name: SS-N-14 'Silex')
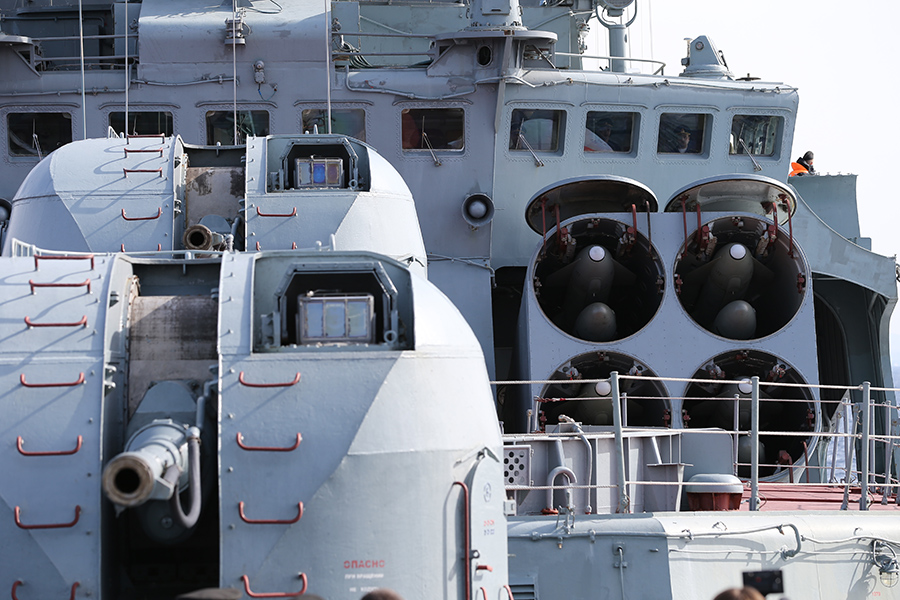
- Launcher with SS-N-14 missiles on an Udaloy-class destroyer.
- Type: Anti-submarine/ship missile
- Place of origin: Soviet Union

Service history
- In service: 1969–current
- Used by: Russia

Production history
- Designed: 1960s

Specifications
- Mass: 3,930 kg (8,660 lb)
- Length: 7.2 m (24 ft) (85R missile)
- Warhead: Various ASW torpedoes or nuclear depth charge. Later multi purpose torpedoes and 185 kg shaped charge warhead against ships.
- Propellant: solid fuel rocket
- Operational range: 10 – 100 km for 85RU/URPK-5 Rastrub (versus ship); 5 – 90 km (anti-sub )
- Maximum depth: 20–500 metres
- Maximum speed: Mach 0.95, 290 m/s (650 mph)
- Guidance system: Radio command via helicopter or other external guidance plus an IR seeker.
- Launch platform: Kresta II, Kara, Krivak 1 & 2, Udaloy I, Kirov

The Metel Anti-Ship Complex (Russian: противолодочный комплекс «Метель» 'Snowstorm'; NATO reporting name: SS-N-14 Silex) is a Soviet family of anti-submarine missiles. There are different anti-submarine variants ('Metel') for cruisers and frigates, and a later version with a shaped charge ('Rastrub') that can be used against shipping as well as submarines.

The missile carries an underslung anti-submarine torpedo which it drops immediately above the suspected position of a submarine. The torpedo then proceeds to search and then home in on the submarine. In the case of the 85RU/URPK-5, the UGMT-1 torpedo is a multi-purpose torpedo and can be used against submarines as well as surface ships. The missile has been in operational service since 1968, but is no longer in production; it was superseded by the RPK-2 Viyuga (SS-N-15 'Starfish').

== Development ==
In the early 1960s the Soviet Union introduced the RBU-6000 and RBU-1000 anti-submarine rocket launchers, which worked on a similar principle to the Royal Navy's Hedgehog system of the Second World War, propelling small depth charges up to 5,800 metres (6,300 yd) from a ship. However this meant that a ship would still be in range of the submarine's torpedoes and missiles, and depth charges were less accurate than homing torpedoes. In 1963 the US Navy introduced ASROC, a missile that flew to the estimated position of the target submarine, and then dropped a torpedo into the water to destroy it. The SS-N-14 was the Soviet response.

In 1993, an upgraded version, designated YP-85, with a range of 250 km (130 nmi), was proposed for export.

== Design ==
The missile is based on the P-120 Malakhit (NATO: SS-N-9 'Siren') anti-shipping missile. The missile itself is radio command guided and is powered by a solid fuel rocket motor. The later 'Rastrub' models of the weapon were "universal" carrying a UGMT-1 multi-purpose torpedo and in addition had 185 kg (408 lb) shaped charge warhead for use against ships guided by radio command and infrared seeker. In anti-submarine mode the missile flew at approximately 400 m (1,300 ft) altitude, and when it was over the estimated position of the target submarine the missile was commanded to release the torpedo or depth charge. In anti-shipping mode the missile flies much lower, at 15 m (49 ft).

== Operational history ==
The URPK-3 entered service in 1969 on the Kresta II and Kara classes of cruisers. The URPK-4 was introduced in 1973, and the anti-ship version URPK-5 Rastrub in 1976. The URPK-4 has been used With the first batch of the Udaloy-class destroyers; the Udaloy II carries the SS-N-15 'Starfish'. The system was installed on the missilecruiser Admiral Ushakov (ex-Kirov) but not on her sister ships.

Of these the Krestas and Karas have been retired, along with most of the Krivaks and half the Udaloys; the Kirov appears to have been upgraded to the SS-N-16 'Stallion' at some point. 100 missiles are estimated to remain in service as of 2006.

According to some unconfirmed reports, this missile has been used in combination with Tupolev Tu-143 Reys observation UAVs and Russian Tu-243 and Tu-300 derivatives, launched from BAZ-135MB truck launch platforms (originally planned for the Redoubt anti-ship missile complex to SS-N-3 Shaddock missile in coastal defense role, onboard infrastructure and general missile container inherited by the SS-N-9 Siren and the cited and Siren-derivate SS-N-14 Silex missiles) by pro-Russian separatist UAV units in the Russian Invasion of Ukraine since 2014, as a ground attack missile system.

The adaptation includes replacement of originally used UGMT-1 multi-purpose torpedo and PLAB-100 naval depth-charge (variant of Soviet-Russian FAB-100 general-purpose aerial bomb) to FAB-50 or FAB-100, ZAB-50, ZAB-100, OFAB-50 or OFAB-100 and AO-50, AO-100 (twin 50 kg or single 100 kg unguided bombs).

With only 100 missiles in stock left behind after by the successive withdrawal of the last Soviet-origin Kara-class cruisers and Krivak-class frigates in the near Russian Black Sea Fleet depots in Crimea, Metel is only used by the current upgrade of the Udaloy-class destroyers in Russian service.

== Variants ==
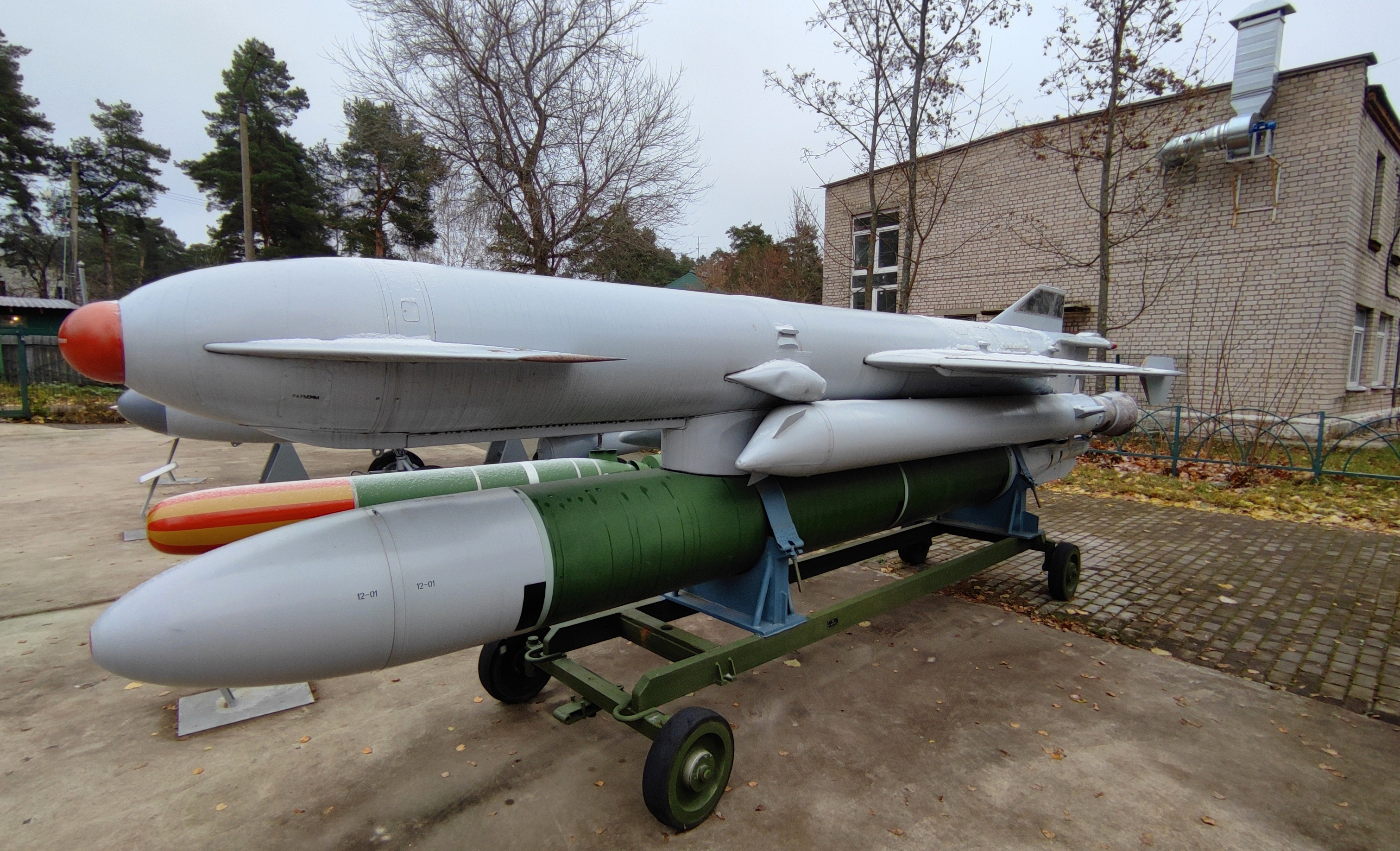
85RU missile in Dubna museum of missiles history, Russia

- 60R - Original version armed with 5 kt nuclear depth charge
- 70R - Original version armed with AT-2U ASW torpedo
- 83R/URPK-3 Metel - Cruiser version of the missile using the guidance system from the SA-N-3 missile and the KT-106 launcher. Uses AT-1 torpedo (EA-45-70A)
- 84R/URPK-4 Metel-U, KT-106U launcher, used on Udaloy-class destroyers. Entered service 1973. Uses AT-2 (AT-2UM) torpedo (E53-72), which has either 100 kg HE warhead or possibly a 5 kt nuclear warhead.
- 85RU/URPK-5 Rastrub, KT-100U launcher. Entered service 1975. Carries UGMT-1 (AT-3 Orlan) anti- sub and anti-ship torpedo and is in addition anti-shipping missile with a warhead of 185 kg.
  - 85RUS/URPK-5 Nuclear tipped version of the missile.
- YP-85 Proposed long-range version - see above.

== Operators ==
Russia
Soviet Union

== Gallery ==
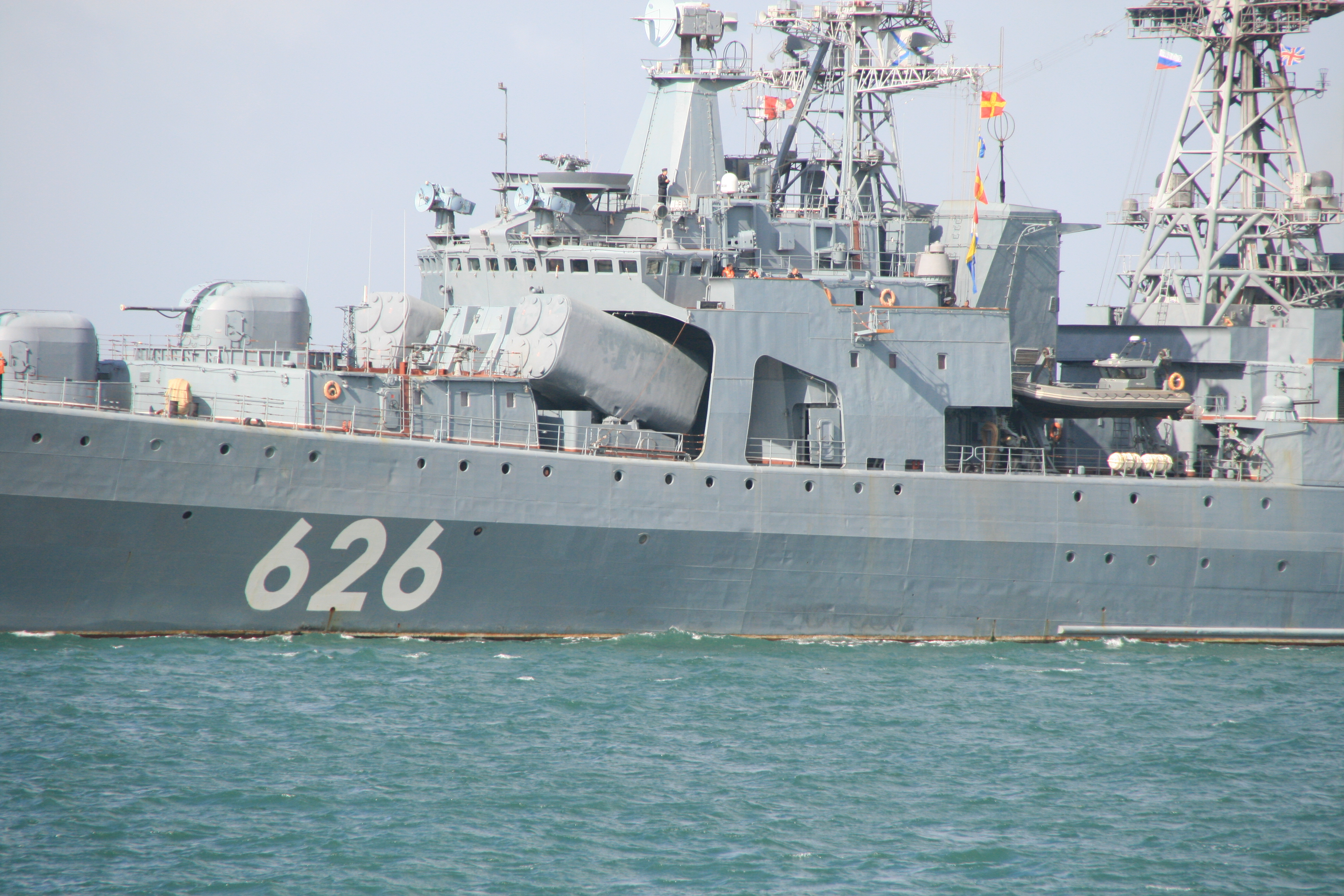
SS-N-14 Silex missiles aboard the Udaloy-class destroyer Vice Admiral Kulakov departing Portsmouth Naval Base, United Kingdom, August 2012.

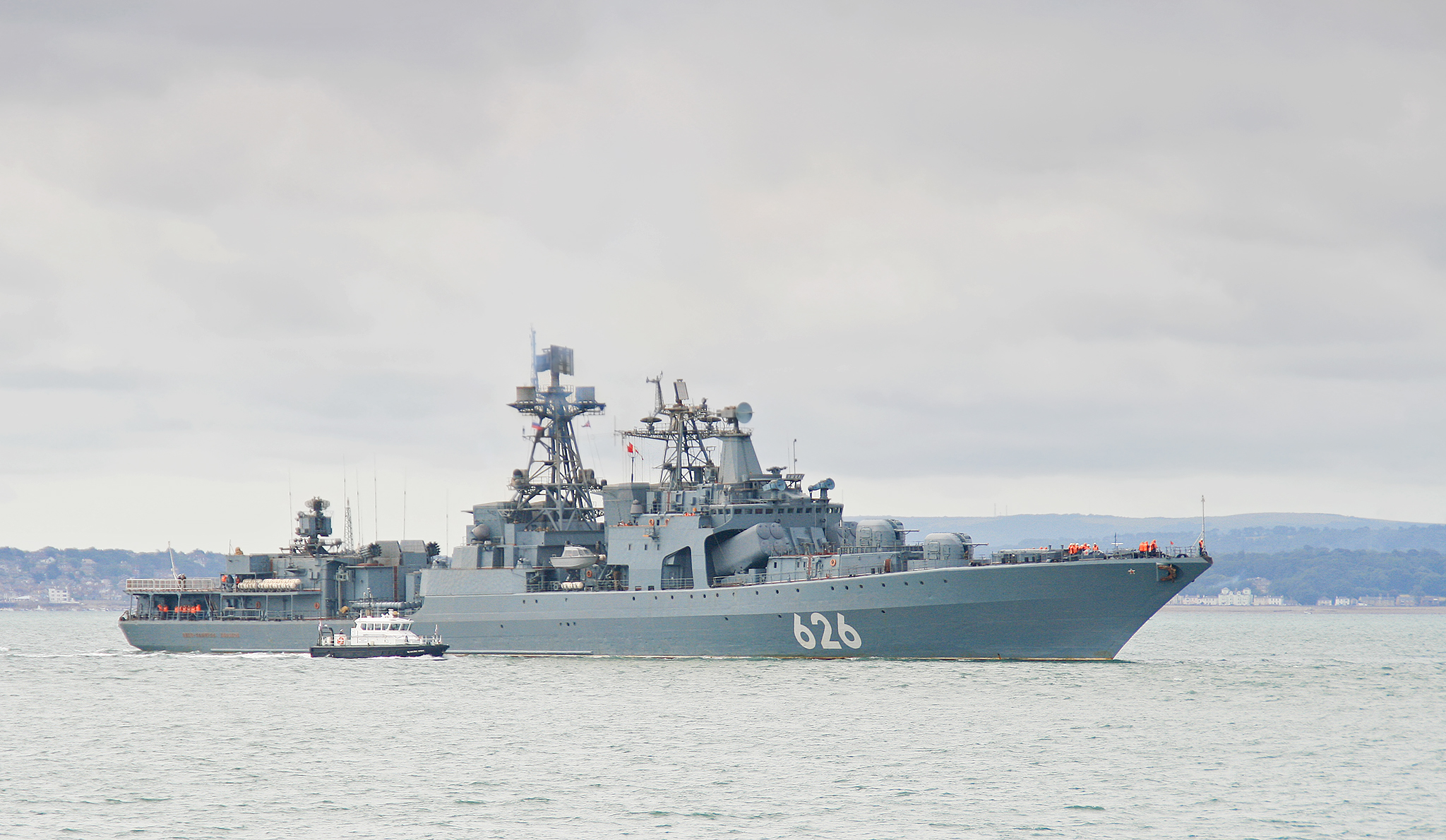
SS-N-14 Silex missile launchers aboard the Udaloy-class destroyer Vice Admiral Kulakov arriving at Portsmouth Naval Base, United Kingdom, August 2012.

== Notes and references ==
- Naval Institute Guide to World Naval Weapon Systems 1997 to 1998
- Jane's Underwater Warfare Systems 2006-2007
