= AK-630 =

Soviet and Russian fully automatic naval close-in weapon system

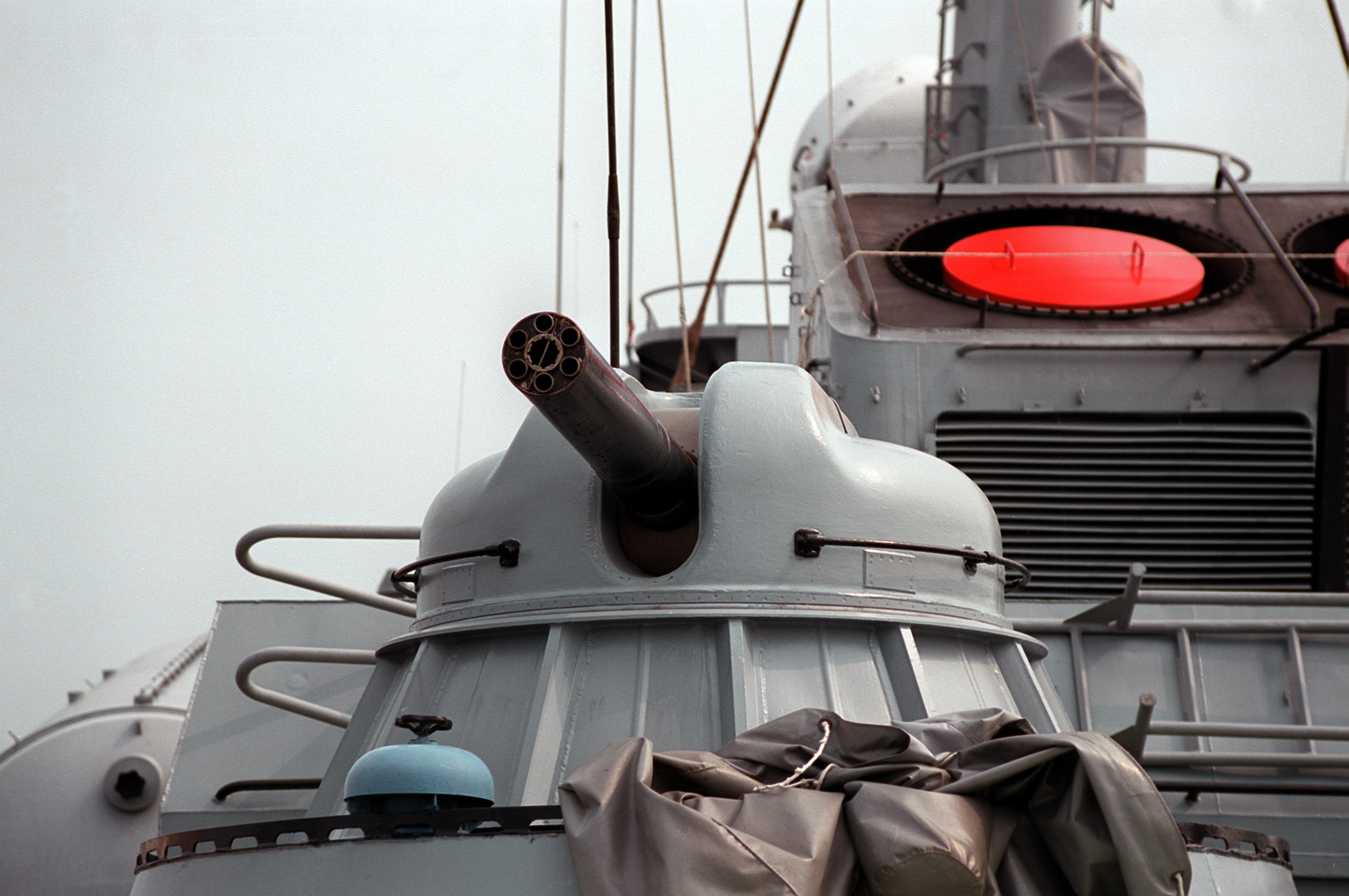
- One of two AK-630M installations on the former East-German ship Hiddensee
- Type: Close-in weapon system Rotary cannon
- Place of origin: Soviet Union, Russia

Service history
- In service: 1976–present
- Used by: See Operators

Production history
- Designer: Developer: TsKIB SOO (Mikhail Knebelman; Vasily Bakalev (AK-630M1-2)); Cannon: KBP Instrument Design Bureau (Vasily Gryazev, Arkady Shipunov); Fire control system: Zavod Topaz (V. P. Yegorov): Vympel MR-123, Vympel-A MR-123/176; Ametist Design Bureau: Vympel-AM MR-123-02/MR-123-03, Vympel-AME MR-123-02/176
- Designed: 1963–1973 (AK-630); 1983–1989 (1993) (AK-630M1-2)
- Manufacturer: Tulamashzavod Gun and Shell Factory; Advanced Weapons and Equipment India
- Produced: 1972–present
- No. built: More than 1000
- Variants: AK-630M, AK-630M1; AK-306 (non-CIWS); AK-630M1-2, AK-630M-2 Duet

Specifications
- Mass: Gun Mount: 1,000 kg (2,200 lb) (AK-630); 1,800 kg (4,000 lb) (AK-630M); 2,500 kg (5,500 lb) (AK-630M-2); External nodes: 800 kg (1,800 lb) (AK-630); 2000 rounds in belt: 1,918 kg (4,228 lb); Fire Control System: ? (Vympel MR-123) ? (Vympel-A MR-123/176); 5.2 tonnes (5.7 short tons) (Vympel-AM MR-123-02/MR-123-03 and Vympel-AME MR-123-02/176); 1 tonne (2,200 lb) (Laska 5P-10E)
- Barrel length: 1,629 mm (64 in) (total); 1,460 mm (57 in) (rifled)
- Width: 1,240 mm (49 in) (mount ring)
- Height: 1,070 mm (42 in) (above deck); 2,050 mm (81 in) (below deck)
- Crew: 1
- Shell: HEI-Frag, Frag-T
- Shell weight: 0.39 kg (0.86 lb)
- Caliber: 30×165mm AO-18 (Note: Not compatible with the army 30×165mm ammunition – different primers, powder sorts and loads, and fuzes are used.)
- Barrels: 6 (AK-630M); 6 (× 2) (AK-630M1-2)
- Action: Gas-operated rotary cannon
- Elevation: +88° ... -12° (50°/sec) +90° ... -25° (60°/sec) AK-630M-2
- Traverse: ±180° (70°/sec) ±180° (80°/sec) AK-630M-2
- Rate of fire: 4,000–5,000 rounds/min (AK-630M); 10,000 rounds/min (AK-630M1-2)
- Muzzle velocity: 880–900 m/s (2,900–3,000 ft/s)
- Effective firing range: 4,000 m (13,000 ft) (aerial); 5,000 m (16,000 ft) (maritime); 5,000 m (16,000 ft) (all, AK-630M-2)
- Maximum firing range: Projectiles self-destruct past 5,000 m (16,000 ft)
- Feed system: Belt: 2,000 rounds (additional 1,000 rounds in reserve feed bin, AK-630M); 4,000 rounds (AK-630M1-2)
- Sights: Radar / TV-optical
- Main armament: 1 or 2 AO-18 autocannons
- Secondary armament: 4 9A4172 missiles (Vikhr-K upgrade)

The AK-630 is a Soviet and Russian fully automatic naval, rotary cannon, close-in weapon system. The "630" designation refers to the weapon's six gun barrels and their 30 mm caliber.

The system is mounted in an enclosed automatic turret and directed by MR-123 fire-control radar and television detection and tracking. The weapon's primary purpose is defense against aircraft and helicopters. As one of the tried-and-true CIWS systems available, effectiveness against anti-ship missiles has been demonstrated over the years in exercises, making it the staple anti-air weapon of most Soviet naval vessels.

The AK-630 is intended to be used against ships and other small craft, coastal targets, and floating mines. Once operational, the system was rapidly adopted and installed in every new Soviet warship (from mine-hunters to aircraft carriers) with up to eight units on larger vessels; hundreds have been produced in total.

== History ==
The AK-630 was fitted on most of the Soviet Kiev-class aircraft carriers, as well as a majority of Soviet military ships. The AK-630 and it's variants is still in service with some countries like Vietnam and most post-Soviet nations.

It is reported that Gun and Shell Factory makes the AK-630 in India. During the Russo-Ukrainian War, the AK-630 was installed on trucks.

== Design ==
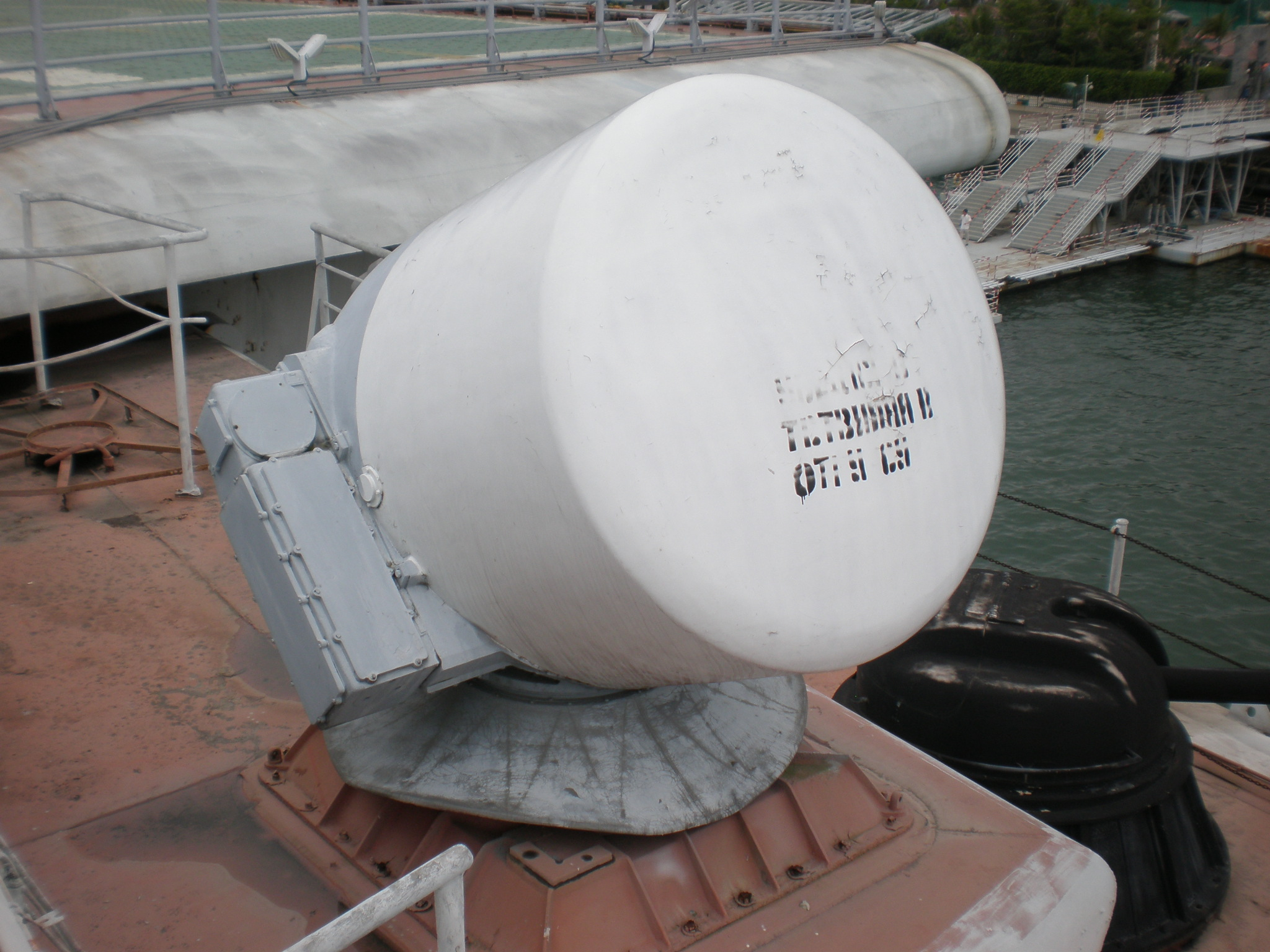
MR-123 fire-control radar on the Soviet aircraft carrier Minsk

The complete weapon system is called A-213-Vympel-A, which comprises the AK-630M Gun Mount, MR-123-02 Fire-Control Radar System, and SP-521 Electrical-Optical Tracker. A single MR-123 radar system (NATO Reporting Name: Bass Tilt) can simultaneously control two guns, either two 30 mm gun mounts, or two 57 mm gun mounts, or one 30 mm gun and one 57 mm gun. The radar system can engage aerial and surface targets at 4 and 5 kilometres (2.5 and 3.1 mi) respectively. The electro-optical system can detect a MiG-21–sized aerial target 7 kilometres (4.3 mi) away, while torpedo boat–sized surface targets can be detected at a range of up to 70 kilometres (43 mi). Features include surveillance and tracking modes, high jamming immunity, laser range finder and TV optical sight. It is in operation on almost all Russian navy ships from fast attack boats to the Kirov-class battlecruiser.

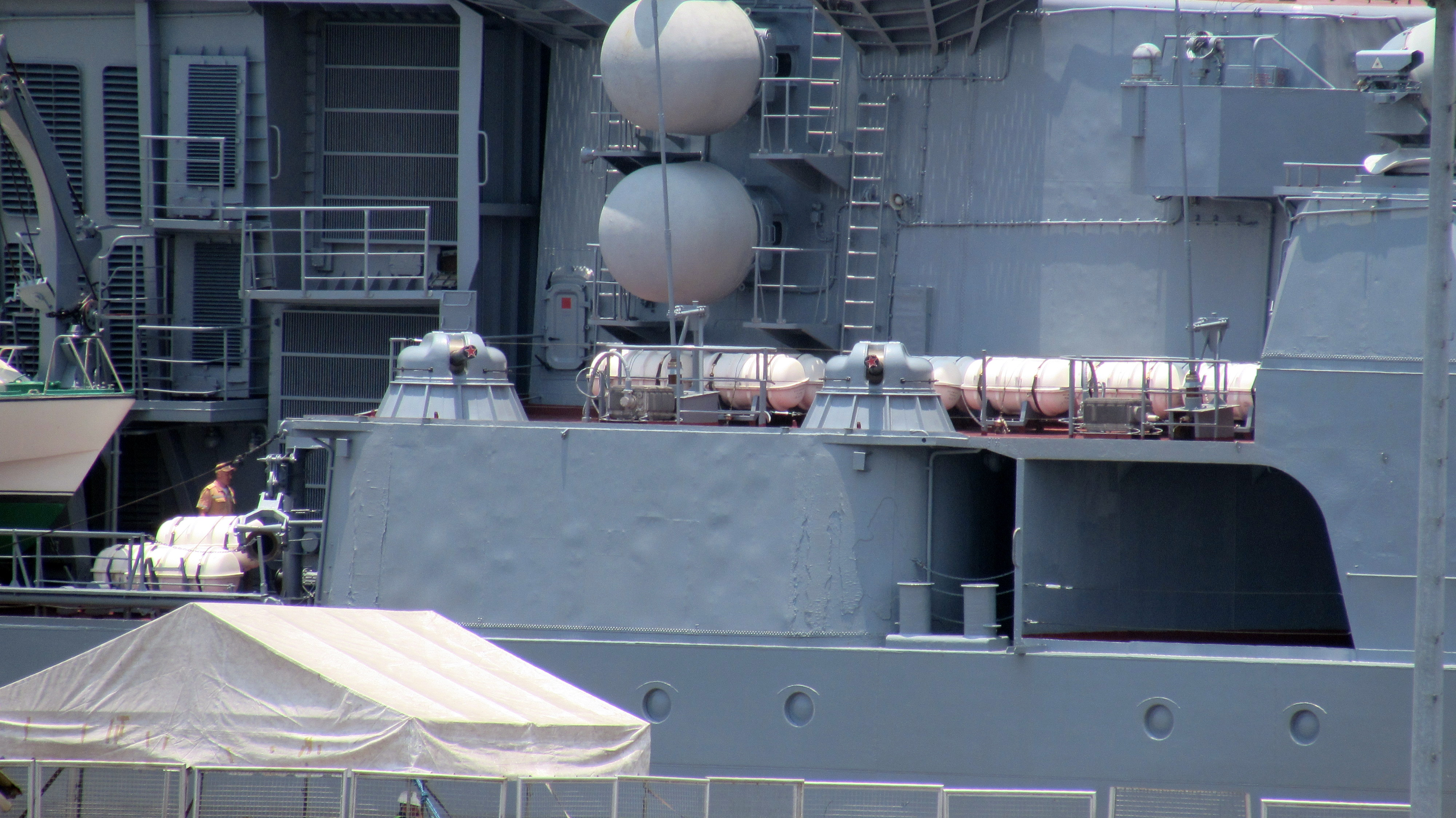
Kolonka fire-control system

The gun mount is fully automated, and can also be remotely controlled by an operator from either the control console or via a remotely mounted gunsight. It has a higher firing rate than both the Goalkeeper and Phalanx (Block 1 and older) CIWS models. They are often mounted in pairs, with as many as four pairs mounted on the larger ships, providing an effective point defence (last) layer. However, like all gun-based CIWS, they suffer from short engagement times and the need for multiple volleys to effectively eradicate a threat.

== Development ==
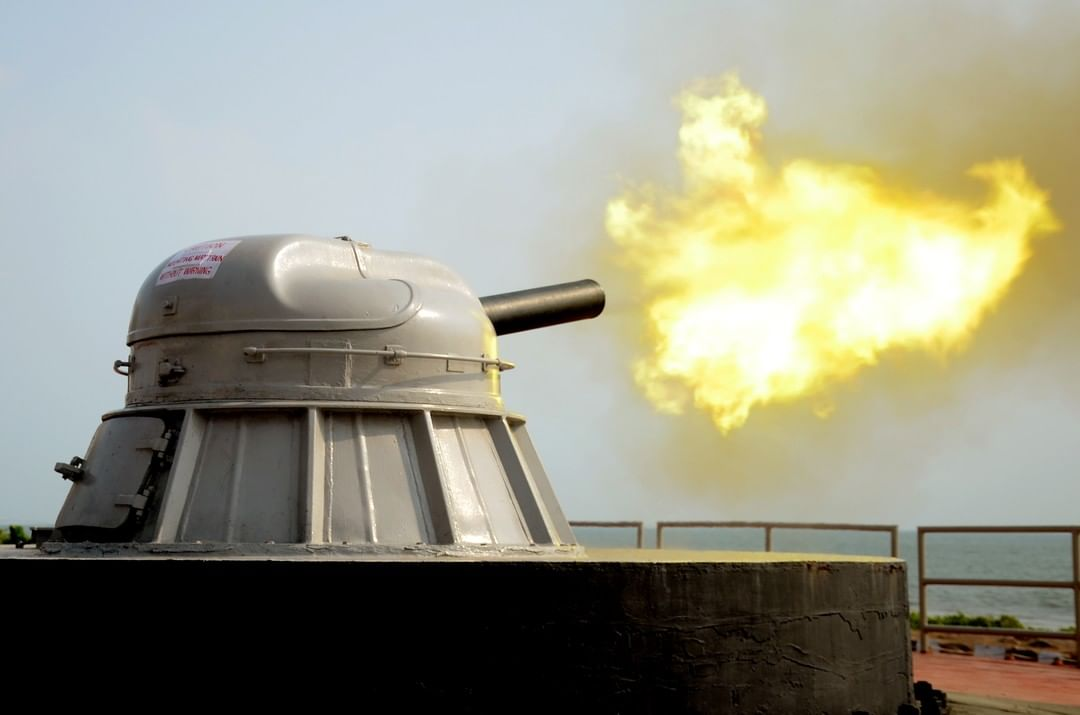
Coastal based AK-630 of the Indian Navy during firing drill

The AK-630 CIWS has several versions and sometimes the Kashtan CIWS's sub-systems and its derivatives are also included.

=== AK-630 ===
The design of the AK-630 CIWS was initiated in 1963, with the first operational prototype completed in 1964. Trials of the complete system, including radar and controls went on until 1976 when the system was accepted for service.

=== AK-630M ===
During the deployment of the system, numerous problems that did not appear in trials were exposed in its application, and some modification of the original AK-630 was made to correct these problems, and in 1979, the new system was named as AK-630M and was accepted into service.

=== AK-306 ===
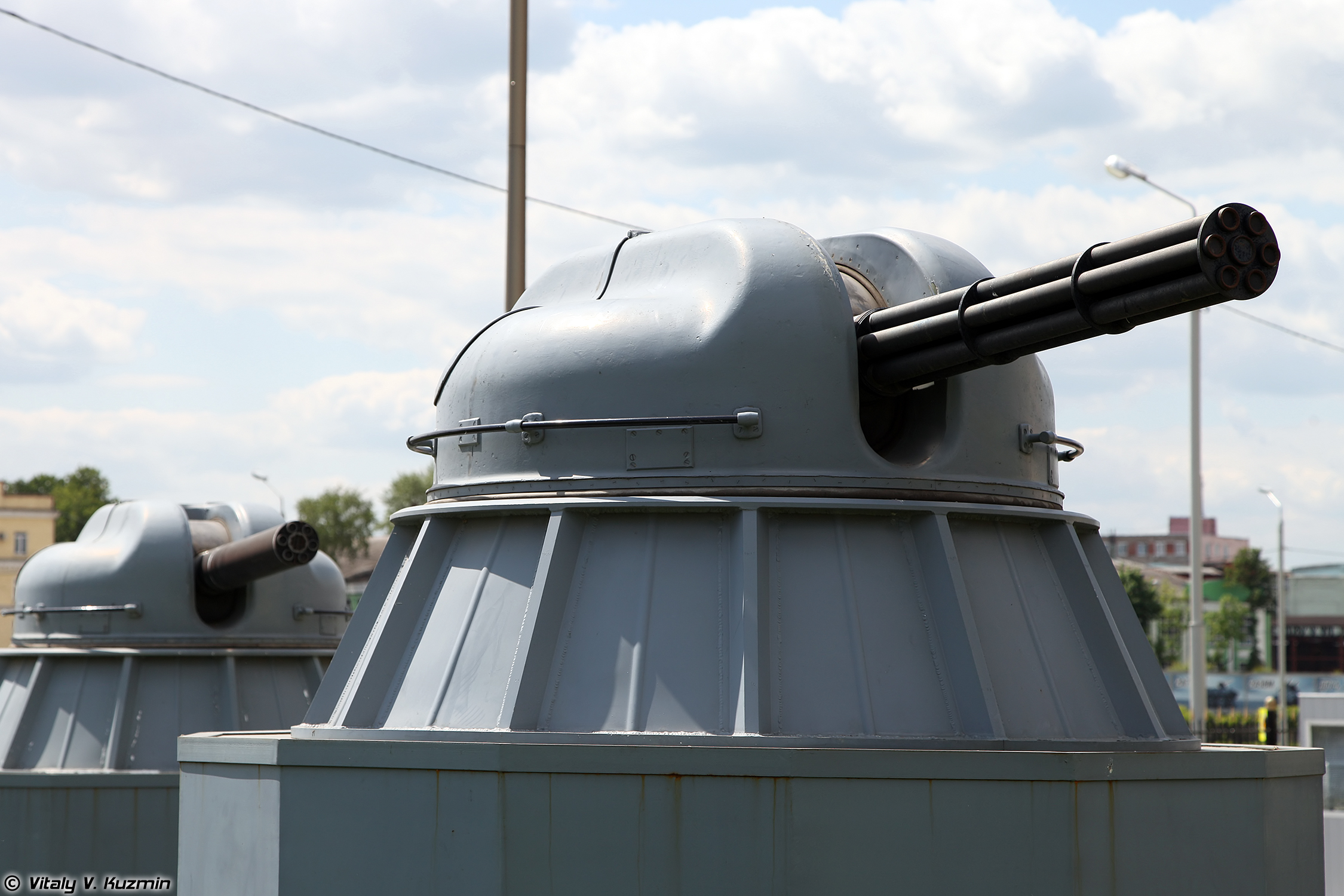
AK-306 (foreground) and AK-630M (background)

A derivative of AK-630M was developed for light craft and this system was named as AK-306. Externally, the air-cooled AK-306 can be distinguished from the AK-630 by the absence of the water cooling system (a cylindrical jacket that surrounds the barrel cluster of the AK-630). Internally, the AK-306 (A-219) used electricity to power the automatics, instead of using the exhaust. This version also lacked radar control, being only optically guided, hence making it less of an anti-missile weapon and more of a surface-to-surface weapon, and the designation of the overall system is consequently changed from A-213-Vympel-A to A-219. The design started in 1974 and the system was accepted into service in 1980. When production was completed in 1986, 125 systems were in service.

=== AK-630M1-2 ===
In 1983, a decision was made to update the design and modify the AK-630 system to include a second gun mounted above the first, which provides 10,000 rpm in total. The AK-630M1-2 "Roy" was roughly the same size and weight allowing installation in existing AK-630 mounts. Though the system proved to be successful, the AK-630M1-2 Roy was not accepted for production due to the maturity of a combined missile and gun system, then designated the 3M87 Kortik, but later called Kashtan. The single example of AK-630M1-2 Roy remains installed on the Project 206.6 class missile boat # P-44.

=== AK-630M2 ===
In July 2007 at IMDS-2007, a modernized version of the AK-630M1-2 called AK-630M2 with two AO-18KD rotary cannons was showcased by OAO AK Tulamashzavod under the new name "Duet". Visually "Duet" differs from "Roy" in having a new mount with a stealthy low RCS design compared with the more traditional rounded AK-630 mounts.

In 2012 it was announced that the new Ivan Gren-class landing ship would be armed with the modified AK-630M2 system. It is also used by the Buyan-M-class missile corvette.

=== H/PJ-13 ===
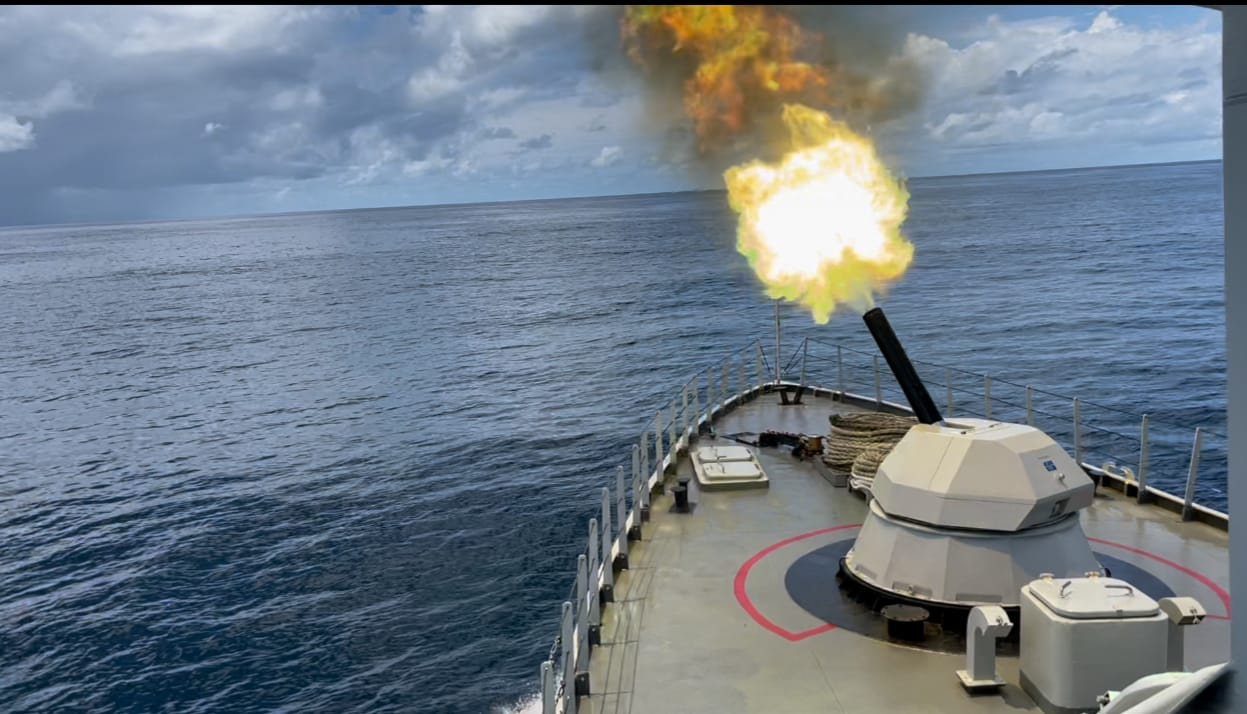
H/PJ-13 (NG-18)

H/PJ-13 is the Chinese upgraded version of AK-630M. The most obvious visual difference between AK-630 and its Chinese cousin H/PJ-13 is that the latter has a stealth turret. Instead of MP-123-02 fire-control radar originally used on AK-630M, a modified version of Type 347 radar is used. The original electro-optical system of AK-630M is also replaced by domestic Chinese system ZGJ-1B, and the fire control system is replaced by domestic Chinese ZFJ-1A fire control system. To improve its anti-missile capability, Chinese have also developed APDS round for H/PJ-13 to supplement/replace the original high explosive round of the AK-630M.

=== Kamand ===
The Kamand is an Iranian CIWS based on AK-630 to counter anti-ship missiles and low flying aircraft. The Kamand gun system is able to hit airborne targets at a range of two kilometres firing projectiles at a rate of 4,000 to 7,000 rounds per minute. The said system is installed on some Iranian naval ships like Alborz and Sahand frigates.

== Comparison with current CIWS ==
Comparison of some modern CIWS
	(Russia) AK-630	(Russia) AK-630M1-2	(United States) Phalanx CIWS	(Netherlands) Goalkeeper CIWS	(Italy) DARDO
Weight	9,114 kg (20,093 lb)	11,819 kg (26,056 lb)	6,200 kg (13,700 lb, incl. in-built radars)	9,902 kg (21,830 lb)	5,500 kg (12,100 lb)
Armament	30 mm (1.2 in) 6-barrel GSh-6-30 rotary cannon	2 × 30 mm (1.2 in) 6-barrel GSh-6-30 rotary cannon	20 mm (0.79 in) 6-barrel M61 Vulcan rotary cannon	30 mm (1.2 in) 7-barrel GAU-8 rotary cannon	40 mm (1.6 in) 2-barrel Bofors 40 mm
Rate of Fire	5,000 rounds per minute	10,000 rounds per minute	4,500 rounds per minute	4,200 rounds per minute	600/900 rounds per minute (optionally: proximity-fuse rounds)
(effective/ flat-trajectory) Range	4,000 m (13,000 ft)	4,000 m (13,000 ft)	2,600 m (8,500 ft)	3,500 m (11,500 ft)	4,000 m (13,000 ft)
Ammunition storage	2,000 rounds	4,000 rounds	1,550 rounds	1,190 rounds	736 rounds
Muzzle velocity	900 m (3,000 ft) per second	900 m (3,000 ft) per second	1,100 m (3,600 ft) per second	1,109 m (3,638 ft) per second	1,000 m (3,300 ft) per second
Elevation	−12 to +88 degrees	−25 to +90 degrees	−25 to +85 degrees	−25 to +85 degrees	−13 to +85 degrees
Traverse	±180 degrees	±180 degrees	±150 degrees	360 degrees	360 degrees

== Operators ==
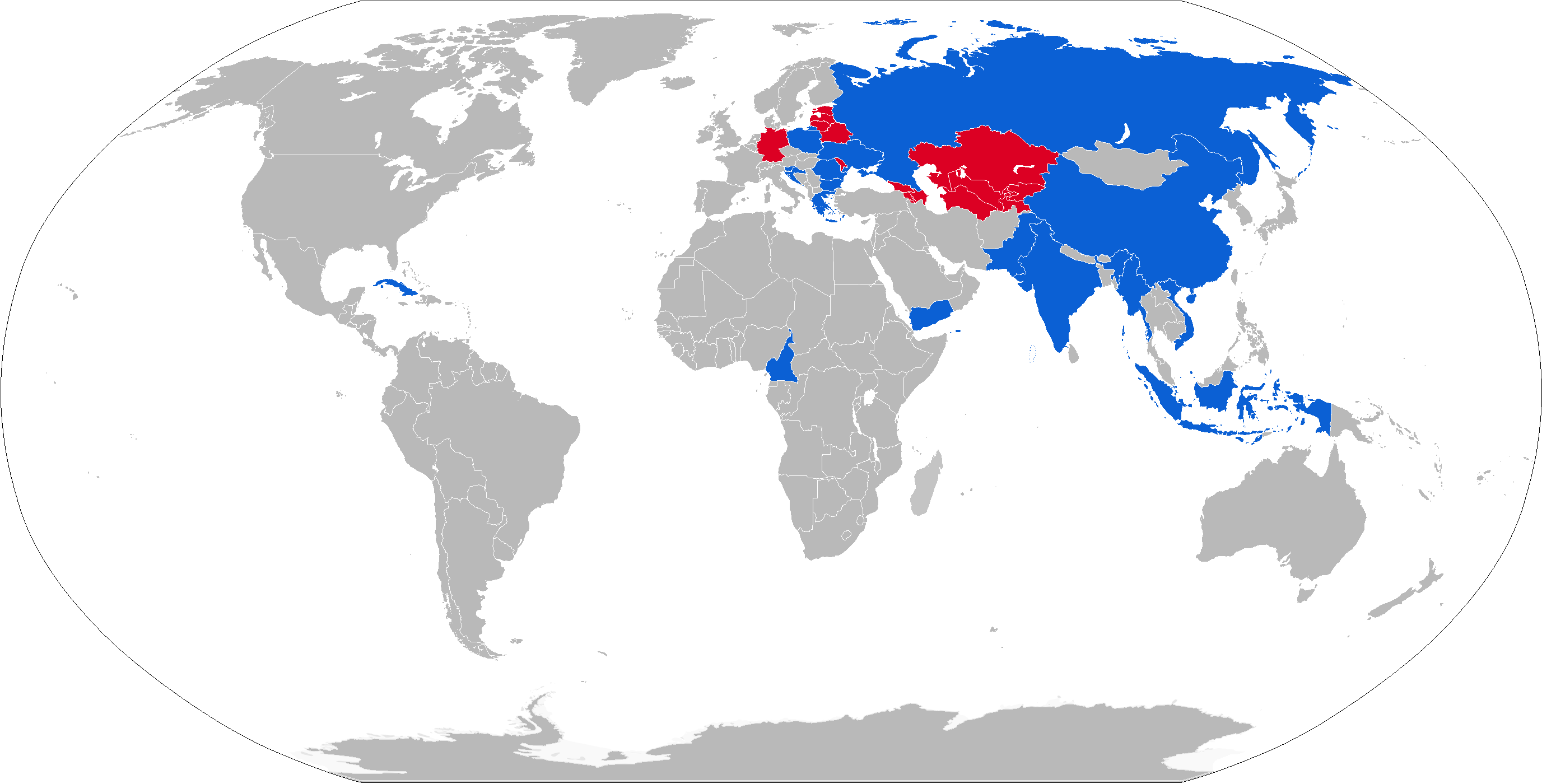
Operators: Current Former

=== Current operators ===
- Algerian National Navy on Steregushchiy-class corvette
- Bulgaria
- Cameroon
- People's Republic of China
- Croatia
- Cuba
- Egypt
- India
- Indonesia
- Iran
- Greece
- Kazakhstan
- Kenya
- Myanmar
- North Korea
- Pakistan
- Poland
- Romania
- Russia
- Ukraine
- Vietnam
- Yemen

=== Former operators ===
- East Germany
- Germany
- Soviet Union
- Slovenia

== See also ==
- AK-230
- 3K95 Kinzhal
- Kortik CIWS
- List of Russian inventions
