= Soviet frigate Pytlivyy =

Krivak-class frigate

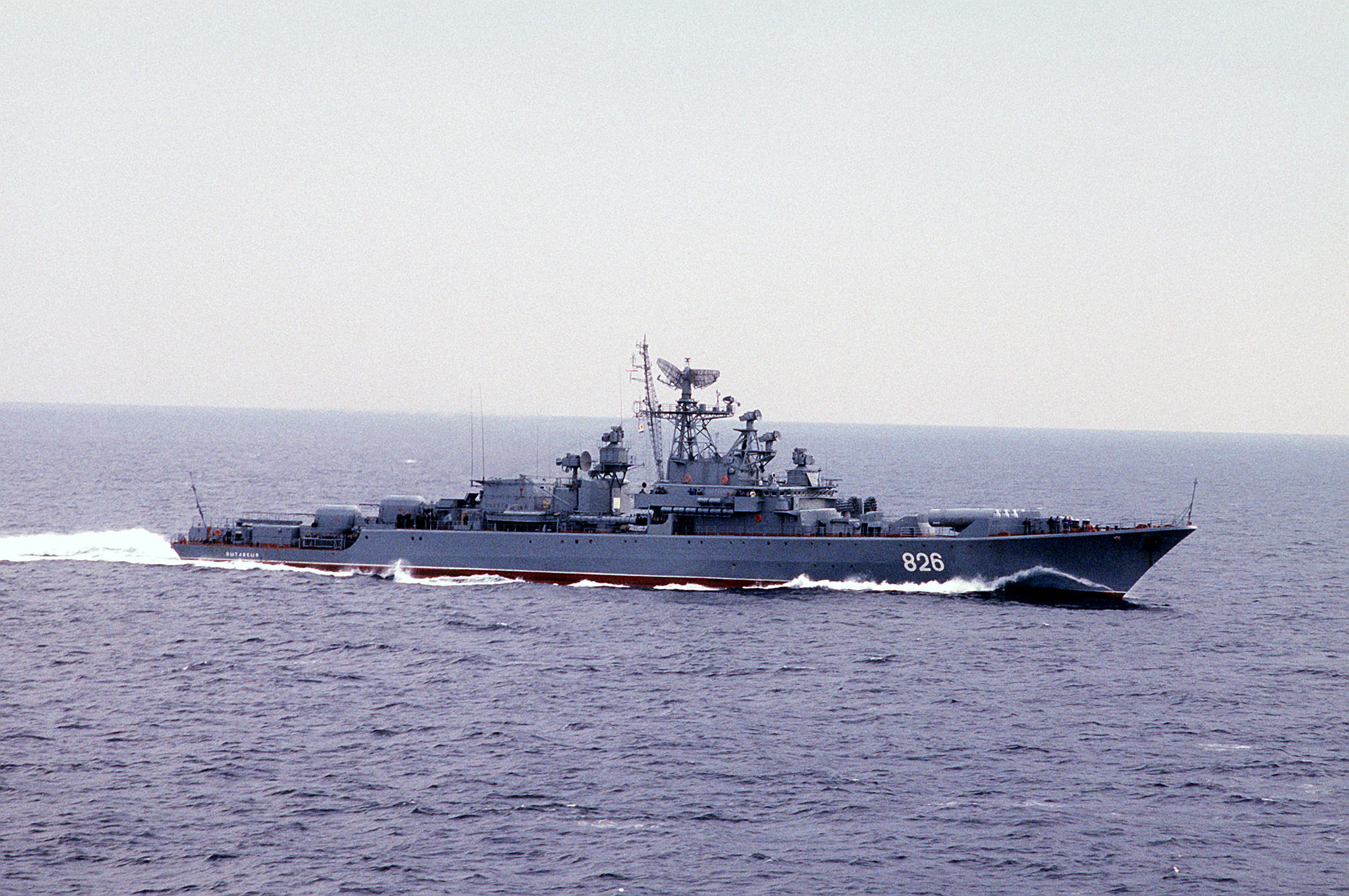
- Pytlivyy underway on 1 November 1986.

History

Soviet Union → Russia
- Name: Pytlivyy
- Namesake: Russian for Inquisitive
- Builder: Yantar shipyard, Kaliningrad
- Yard number: 169
- Laid down: 27 June 1979
- Launched: 16 April 1981
- Commissioned: 30 November 1981
- Status: In service

General characteristics
- Class & type: Project 1135M Burevestnik frigate
- Displacement: 2,935 t (2,889 long tons; 3,235 short tons) (standard); 3,305 t (3,253 long tons; 3,643 short tons) (full load)
- Length: 123 m (403 ft 7 in)
- Beam: 14.2 m (46 ft 7 in)
- Draft: 4.5 m (14 ft 9 in)
- Installed power: 44,000 shp (33,000 kW)
- Propulsion: 4 gas turbines; COGAG; 2 shafts
- Speed: 32 kn (59 km/h)
- Range: 3,900 nmi (7,223 km) at 14 kn (26 km/h)
- Complement: 23 officers, 171 ratings
- Sensors & processing systems: MR-310A Angara-A air/surface search radar; Don navigational radar; MR-143 Lev-214 fire control radar; MG-332T Titan-2T, MG-325 Vega, 2 MG-7 Braslet and MGS-400K sonars
- Electronic warfare & decoys: PK-16 decoy-dispenser system
- Armament: 4 × URPK-5 Rastrub (SS-N-14 'Silex') anti-submarine and anti-shipping missiles (1×4); 4 × ZIF-122 4K33 launchers (2×2) with 40 4K33 OSA-M (SA-N-4'Gecko') surface to air missiles (2×2); 2 × 100 mm (4 in) AK-100 guns (2×1); 2 × RBU-6000 Smerch-2 anti-submarine rockets; 8 × 533 mm (21 in) torpedo tubes (2×4)

Pytlivyy (also transliterated Pytlivy or Pytliviy, Russian: Пытливый, "Inquisitive") is a Project 1135M Burevestnik-class (Russian: Буревестник, "Petrel") Guard Ship (Сторожевой Корабль, SKR) or 'Krivak II'-class frigate that served with the Soviet and Russian navies. Launched on 16 April 1981, the vessel was designed to operate as an anti-submarine vessel, with an armament built around the Metel Anti-Ship Complex. Part of the Black Sea Fleet, the vessel undertook friendly visits to Algeria, Greece, and Malta, at the last hosting a meeting between the Soviet and US leaders Mikhail Gorbachev and George H. W. Bush.

In 1991, the ship was transferred to the Russian Navy following the dissolution of the Soviet Union, and, following a three-year repair, took part in a number of joint exercises with other navies. For example, 2003 found the vessel operating alongside the Indian Navy and 2005 with the Italian Navy. In 2006, Pytlivyy took part in NATO's Operation Active Endeavour and subsequently formed part of Russia's presence in the Mediterranean Sea in the war against terrorism in the early 21st century. The ship also operated as part of the Russian intervention in the Syrian civil war. As of 2021, Pytlivyy remains in service.

== Design and development ==
Pytlivyy was one of eleven Project 1135M ships launched between 1975 and 1981. Project 1135, the Burevestnik (Russian: Буревестник, "Petrel") class, was envisaged by the Soviet Navy as a less expensive complement to the Project 1134A Berkut A (NATO reporting name 'Kresta II') and Project 1134B Berkut B (NATO reporting name 'Kara') classes of anti-submarine ships. Project 1135M was an improvement developed in 1972 with slightly increased displacement and heavier guns compared with the basic 1135. The design, by N. P. Sobolov, combined a powerful missile armament with good seakeeping for a blue water role. The ships were designated Guard Ship (Сторожевой Корабль, SKR) to reflect their substantial greater anti-ship capability than the earlier members of the class and the Soviet strategy of creating protected areas for friendly submarines close to the coast. NATO forces called the vessels 'Krivak II'-class frigates.

Displacing 2,935 tonnes (2,889 long tons; 3,235 short tons) standard and 3,305 t (3,253 long tons; 3,643 short tons) full load, Pytlivyy was 123 m (403 ft 7 in) long overall, with a beam of 14.2 m (46 ft 7 in) and a draught of 4.5 m (14 ft 9 in). Power was provided by two 22,000-shaft-horsepower (16,000 kW) M7K power sets, each consisting of a combination of a 17,000 shp (13,000 kW) DK59 and a 5,000 shp (3,700 kW) M62 gas turbine arranged in a COGAG installation and driving one fixed-pitch propeller. Design speed was 32 knots (59 km/h; 37 mph) and range 3,900 nautical miles (7,223 km; 4,488 mi) at 14 kn (26 km/h; 16 mph). The ship's complement was 194, including 23 officers.

=== Armament and sensors ===
Pytlivyy was designed for anti-submarine warfare around four URPK-5 Rastrub missiles (NATO reporting name SS-N-14 'Silex'), backed up by a pair of quadruple launchers for 533 mm (21 in) torpedoes and a pair of RBU-6000 213 mm (8 in) Smerch-2 anti-submarine rocket launchers. Both the URPK-5 and the torpedoes also had anti-ship capabilities. Defence against aircraft was provided by forty 4K33 OSA-M (SA-N-4 'Gecko') surface to air missiles which were launched from two sets of twin-arm ZIF-122 launchers. Two 100 mm (4 in) AK-100 guns were mounted aft in a superfiring arrangement.

The ship had a well-equipped sensor suite, including a single MR-310A Angara-A air/surface search radar, Don navigation radar, the MP-401S Start-S Electronic Support Measures (ESM) system and the Spectrum-F laser warning system. Fire control for the guns was provided by a MR-143 Lev-214 radar. An extensive sonar complex was fitted, including the bow-mounted MG-332T Titan-2T and the towed-array MG-325 Vega that had a range of up to 15 kilometres (9.3 mi). The vessel was also equipped with the PK-16 decoy-dispenser system which used chaff as a form of missile defense.

== Construction and career ==
Laid down by on 27 June 1979 with the yard number 169 at the Yantar Shipyard in Kaliningrad, Pytlivyy was launched on 16 April 1981. The ship was the eleventh and last of the class built at the yard and took 1.3 million hours to build, a saving of 39% compared to the first of the class. The vessel, named for a Russian word that can be translated as inquisitive, was commissioned on 30 November and joined the Black Sea Fleet.

=== Soviet Navy service ===
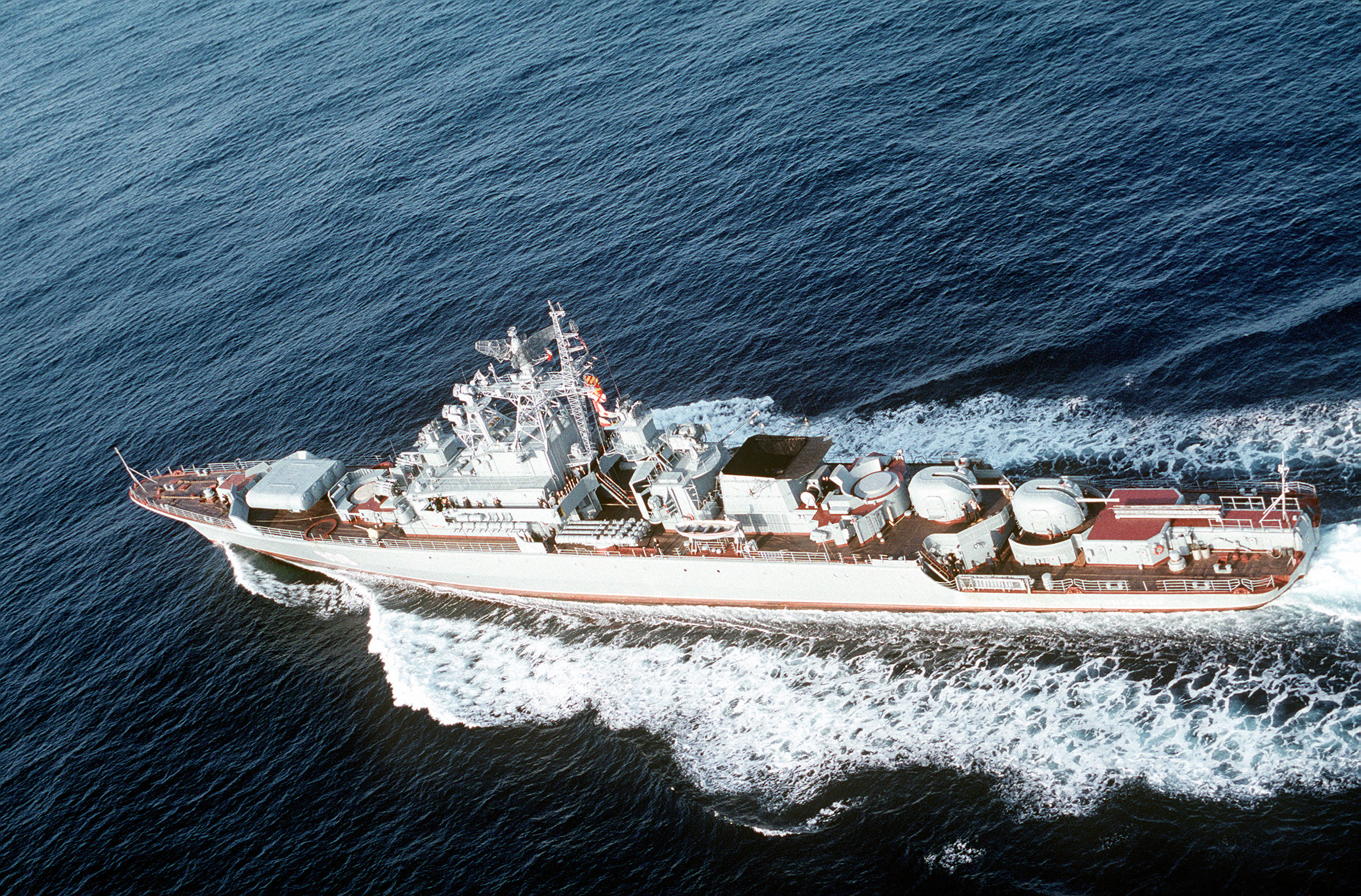
Pytlivy towards the end of Soviet service on 10 December 1991

Soon after shakedown, Pytlivy was sent on missions to foreign ports to promote friendly relationships between the Soviet Union and other nations. On 30 May 1988, the ship arrived at the port of Algiers, Algeria, for a friendly visit, staying until 3 June. On 2 December the following year, the vessel hosted a meeting between the Soviet Premier Mikhail Gorbachev and the US President George H. W. Bush in Valletta, Malta. The ship visited Piraeus, Greece, on 23 January 1990, during which a band composed of sailors from Pytlivy and other Soviet musicians played a concert on the shorefront and the crew took part in sporting events with Greek sailors.

=== Russian Navy service ===
With the dissolution of the Soviet Union on 26 December 1991, Pytlivyy was transferred to the Russian Navy. The ship remained part of the Black Sea Fleet. On 7 September 1993, the vessel returned to the Yantar shipyard to be repaired. The process took little over three years before the ship was recommissioned and reentered service. On 31 March 1999, Pytlivy joined a Russian flotilla led by the cruisers Admiral Golovko and Kerch in a voyage through the Bosphorus into the Adriatic Sea. The voyage was preceded by significant diplomatic activity with Turkey to ensure the smooth passage of the warships from the Black Sea. This was a radical change in Russian naval capability. Previously, they had to rely on members of the Baltic Fleet serving in the Mediterranean Sea due to restrictions imposed by Turkey transiting the strait under the Montreux Convention.

By 2001, Pytlivyy was one of the few Project 1135M ships still in service. Over the following years, the vessel was involved in several joint operations with other navies. On 22 May 2003, the vessel took part in the first INDRA exercise with the Indian Navy. 11 July 2005 found the vessel in Naples, Italy, taking part in a two-day visit that included welcoming Italian Navy sailors onboard. On 15 September the following year, the vessel joined the NATO Operation Active Endeavour, undertaking anti-terrorist patrols in the Mediterranean Sea. The inclusion of a Russian vessel in a NATO operation was innovative, controversial, and brief, lasting one week. The operation involved the sharing of communication codes, operating procedures and other secret information that would normally be restricted to allies only, and would have been unheard of during the Cold War. It led to other similar collaborations between Russia and NATO over the following years.

Subsequently taking part in the Russian intervention in the Syrian civil war, Pytlivyy remained as part of the Russian presence in the Mediterranean. The fleet, which included the battlecruiser Pyotr Velikiy, was ostensibly to protect Russian shipping from terrorism and piracy, and operated from a forward base in Tartus, Syria. Prior to the Russo-Ukraine War, the vessel remained in service, operating between the Black and the Mediterranean Seas. In 2024 it was reported that, in the face of the threat posed by Ukrainian drone and missile strikes, the frigate had re-deployed from its base in Crimea to somewhat greater safety of the eastern part of the Black Sea.
