= Azovstal (disambiguation) =

Azovstal (/ˈæzɒvstɑːl/) may refer to:

- Azovstal Iron and Steel Works, a steel rolling company in Ukraine
- Azovstal railway station, a closed railway station
- FC Mariupol, a football club previously called "Azovstal"

== See also ==
- Azov (disambiguation)
- Stal (disambiguation)
