= Azov (disambiguation) =

Azov is a town in Rostov Oblast, Russia.

Azov may also refer to:

== Places ==
- Sea of Azov, a sea in Eastern Europe, near the town of Azov
- Azov, Novoazovsk Raion, a village in Ukraine
- Azov-Black Sea Krai, a krai in Russia SFSR
- Mount Azov, a mountain in Central Ural, Russia

== Military ==
- Azov Brigade, a unit of the National Guard of Ukraine, part of the 1st Azov Corps
- 1st Azov Corps, a unit of the National Guard of Ukraine
- Azov campaigns (1695–1696), military campaigns during the Russo-Turkish War of 1686–1700
- Sea of Azov naval campaign (1855), fought during the Crimean War
- Battle of the Sea of Azov (1941), fought during the Second World War

== Ships ==
- Azov (1826 ship), a Russian ship of the line
- Ion C. Brătianu, a Romanian Brătianu-class river monitor renamed Azov in 1944 after capture by the Soviet Union
- Russian cruiser Azov, a Soviet, and later Russian, missile cruiser
- Russian landing ship Azov, a Russian landing ship of the Project 775 (Ropucha class)

== Transportation ==
- Azov Avia Airlines, former airline based in Melitopol, Ukraine
- SS Azov, a number of ships with this name

== Other uses ==
- Memory of Azov (Fabergé egg), a jewelled Easter egg
- FC APK Morozovsk, a Russian football team formerly known as Luch Azov and APK Azov

== See also ==
- Irving Azoff (born 1947), U.S. entertainment executive
