= Soviet cruiser Nikolayev =

Cruiser of the Soviet Navy

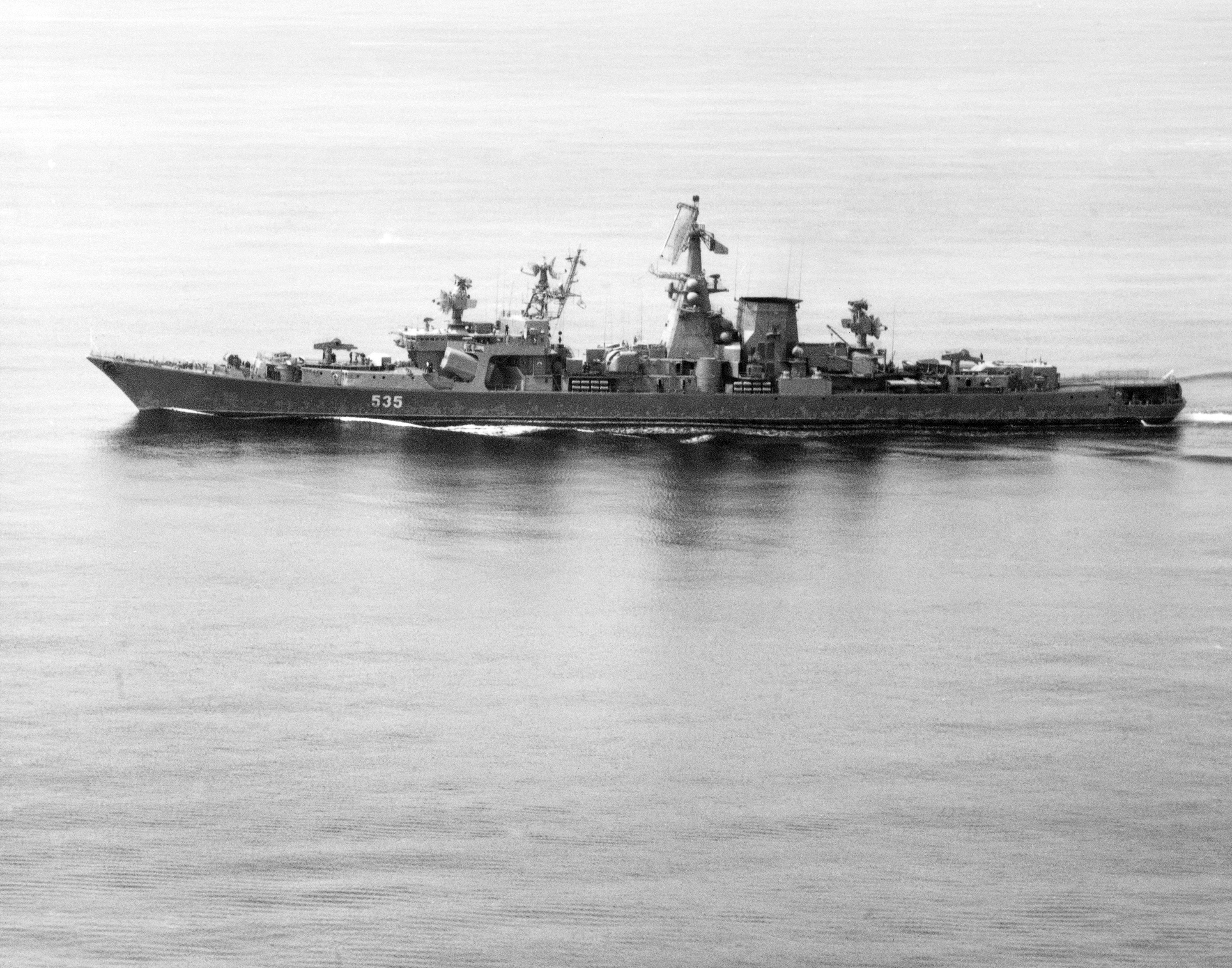
- Nikolayev in 1986

History

Soviet Union
- Name: Nikolayev
- Namesake: Nikolayev
- Builder: 61 Communards Shipyard
- Laid down: 25 June 1968
- Launched: 19 December 1969
- Commissioned: 31 December 1971
- Decommissioned: 3 July 1992
- Fate: Scrapped, 1994

General characteristics
- Class & type: Kara-class cruiser
- Displacement: 8,200 tons standard; 9,700 tons full load
- Length: 173.2 m (568 ft)
- Beam: 18.6 m (61 ft)
- Draught: 6.7 m (22 ft)
- Propulsion: 2 shaft COGAG, 4 gas turbines, 120,000 hp (89 MW)
- Speed: 34 knots (63 km/h; 39 mph)
- Range: 9,000 nmi (17,000 km; 10,000 mi)
- Complement: 380
- Armament: 2 quad SS-N-14 Silex anti-submarine missiles; 2 twin SA-N-3 Goblet surface-to-air missile launchers (80 missiles); SA-N-4 Gecko surface-to-air missile launchers (40 missiles); 2 twin 76mm AK-726 dual purpose guns; 4 30mm AK-630 CIWS; 2 × 5 533 mm PTA-53-1134B torpedo tubes; 2 RBU-6000 anti-submarine rocket launchers; 2 RBU-1000 anti-submarine rocket launchers
- Aircraft carried: 1 Kamov Ka-25 'Hormone-A' or Kamov Ka-27 'Helix'

Nikolayev was the lead ship of the Kara-class cruisers of the Soviet Navy. She was launched on 19 December 1969 and commissioned on 31 December 1971 at the 61 Communards Shipyard. On 8 February 1972, she became part of the 30th Surface Ship Division of the Black Sea Fleet. She visited Split, Yugoslavia, from 26 September to 1 October 1973, and Havana, Cuba from 15 to 21 April 1981. On 9 April 1984, she was reassigned to the Pacific Fleet. On 16 July 1986 at night, she collided with destroyer Strogy (1967) during exercises in the Sea of Japan. After minor repairs at Dalzavod, Vladivostok, she made a transition to Sevastopol, and then to Nikolayev. On 1 November 1987, Nikolayev was delivered to Nikolayev for major repairs. In April 1992, the repairs were cancelled and on 29 October 1992, she was decommissioned. On 10 August 1994, she was towed for scrapping in India.
