= SS Azov =

A number of steamships have been named Azov, including -

- SS Azov (1892), a cargo ship wrecked in 1925
- SS Azov (1895), renamed Heinrich Menzell 1901 and wrecked in 1904 near Vladivostok
- SS Azov (1929), sunk in an air raid 2 October 1944
- SS Azov (1944), scrapped in 1973

== See also ==
- Russian ship Azov (1826)
- Azov, a Soviet monitor
- Russian cruiser Azov
- Russian landing ship Azov, a Russian landing ship of the Project 775 (Ropucha class)
