= USS John Young =

Spruance-class destroyer

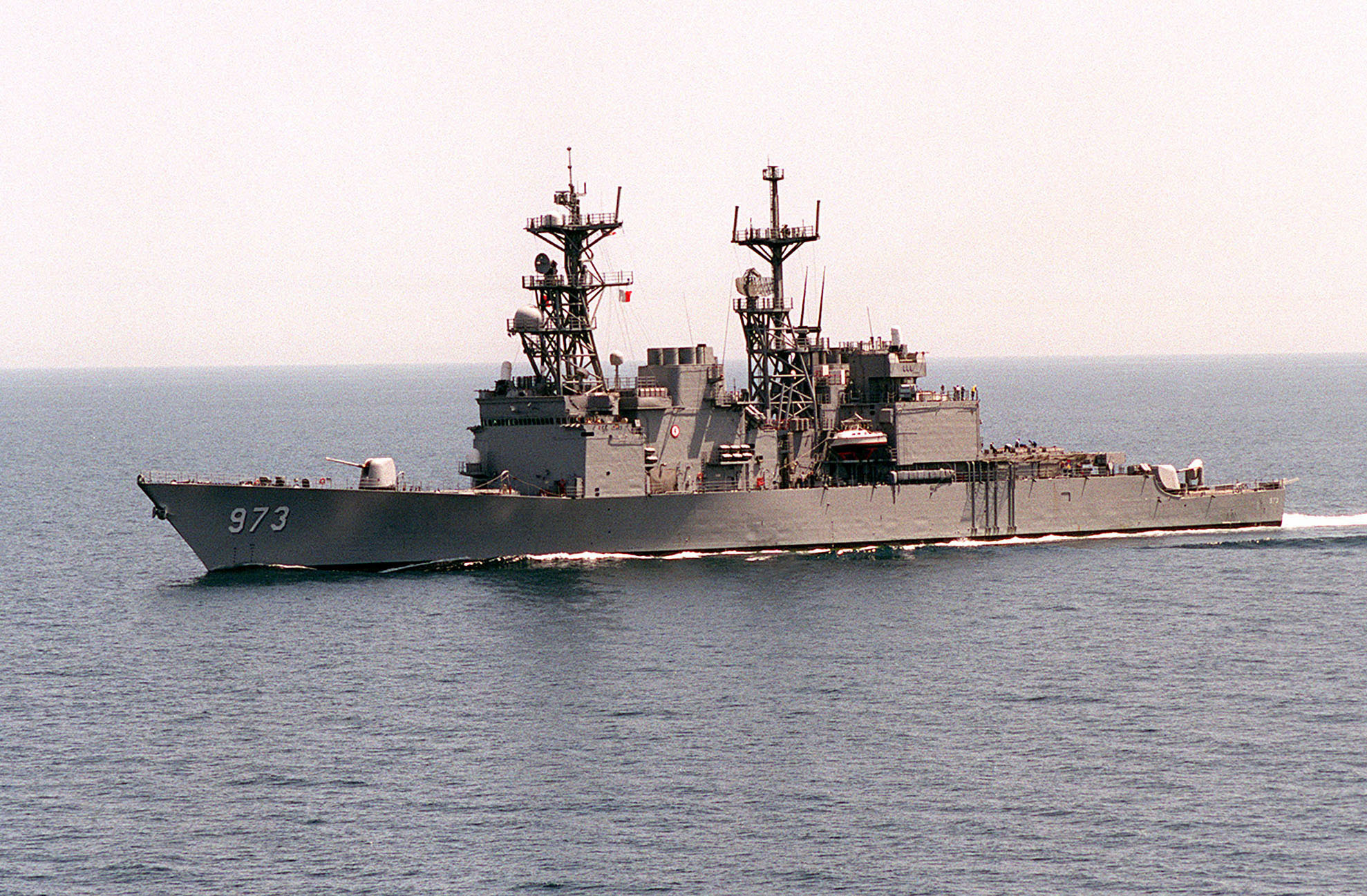
- USS John Young in the Persian Gulf 28 March 1998

History

United States
- Name: John Young
- Namesake: John Young
- Ordered: 26 January 1972
- Builder: Ingalls Shipbuilding
- Laid down: 17 February 1975
- Launched: 6 January 1976
- Acquired: 1 May 1978
- Commissioned: 20 May 1978
- Decommissioned: 30 September 2002
- Stricken: 6 November 2002
- Identification: Callsign: NJYG; Hull number: DD-973
- Motto: Prends La Mer Avec Courage; 'Set Sail With Courage'
- Fate: Sunk as target, 13 April 2004
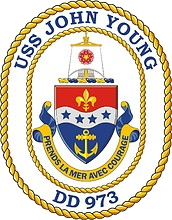
- Badge

General characteristics
- Class & type: Spruance-class destroyer
- Displacement: 8,040 long tons (8,170 t) full load
- Length: 529 ft (161 m) waterline; 563 ft (172 m) overall
- Beam: 55 ft (17 m)
- Draft: 29 ft (8.8 m)
- Installed power: 3 × 501-K17 generator sets (2,000 kW (2,700 hp) each)
- Propulsion: 4 × General Electric LM2500 gas turbines, 2 shafts, 80,000 shp (60 MW)
- Speed: 32.5 knots (60.2 km/h; 37.4 mph)
- Range: 6,000 nmi (11,000 km; 6,900 mi) at 20 knots (37 km/h; 23 mph)
- Complement: 19 officers, 315 enlisted
- Sensors & processing systems: AN/SPS-40 air search radar; AN/SPG-60 fire control radar; AN/SPS-55 surface search radar; AN/SPQ-9 gun fire control radar; Mark 23 TAS automatic detection and tracking radar; AN/SPS-65 missile fire control radar; AN/SQS-53 bow-mounted active sonar; AN/SQR-19 TACTAS towed array passive sonar; Naval Tactical Data System
- Electronic warfare & decoys: AN/SLQ-32 electronic warfare system; AN/SLQ-25 Nixie torpedo countermeasures; Mark 36 SRBOC decoy launching system; AN/SLQ-49 inflatable decoys
- Armament: 2 × 5 in (127 mm) 54 caliber Mark 45 dual purpose guns; 2 × 20 mm Phalanx CIWS Mark 15 guns; 1 × 8 cell ASROC launcher (removed); 1 × 8 cell NATO Sea Sparrow Mark 29 missile launcher; 2 × quadruple Harpoon missile canisters; 2 × Mark 32 triple 12.75 in (324 mm) torpedo tubes (Mk 46 torpedoes); 1 × 61 cell Mk 41 VLS launcher for Tomahawk missiles; 1 × 21 round RIM-116 Rolling Airframe Missile
- Aircraft carried: 2 × Sikorsky SH-60 Seahawk LAMPS III helicopters
- Aviation facilities: Flight deck and enclosed hangar for up to two medium-lift helicopters

USS John Young (DD-973), named for Captain John Young, USN, was a Spruance-class destroyer of the United States Navy. The ship was built by the Ingalls Shipbuilding Division of Litton Industries at Pascagoula, Mississippi.

== Service history ==
In 1987, John Young deployed off the coast of Iran in support of Operation Earnest Will and participated in Operation Nimble Archer. John Young deployed with Battle Group Echo, which included the aircraft carrier Ranger, battleship Missouri, cruisers Long Beach, Bunker Hill, destroyers Leftwich and Hoel, frigates Curts, Harold E. Holt, Robert E. Peary, Schofield and auxiliaries Shasta, Wichita, Kansas City, Hassayampa.

John Young, following appropriate Congressional notification, became one of eight combat ships that began receiving women as crewmembers in 1994.

As part of a reorganization by the Pacific Fleet's surface ships into six core battle groups and eight destroyer squadrons, with the reorganization scheduled to be completed by 1 October 1995, and homeport changes to be completed within the following, year, John Young was reassigned to Destroyer Squadron 23.

John Young departed San Diego on 9 February 1996 en route to the Persian Gulf for a six-month deployment as part of the Middle East Force (MEF). This deployment was remarkable because a main engineering space was completely gutted and refitted following a major fuel oil leak just days before that trapped several crew members in thirty thousand gallons of fuel. The ship was having extensive last-minute pre-deployment repairs, requiring most of the installed firefighting systems to be disabled. Also, the fire-proof escape doors in all the engineering spaces were temporarily removed for repairs. Had the fuel ignited, it would have been catastrophic to not only John Young, but the many ships nearby in port.

On 28 April 1996, a Navy boarding team aboard John Young boarded a merchant ship thus marking the 10,000th such boarding in support of United Nations sanctions against Iraq. As part of a multinational maritime interception force, operating in the Persian Gulf, the team boarded an Indian flagged dhow in the Persian Gulf to make the milestone boarding. The vessel was empty and permitted to proceed.

John Young departed San Diego on 18 November 1997 en route to the Persian Gulf for a six-month deployment as part of the Middle East Force (MEF).

John Young teamed up with a Coast Guard Law Enforcement Detachment (LEDET) in late March 2001 for a major drug bust at sea. She was last stationed at San Diego, California.

== Fate ==
John Young was decommissioned on 30 September 2002, and stricken 6 November 2002, laid up at Bremerton, Washington NISMF. On 13 April 2004, John Young was sunk during exercise RIMPAC 04 by a Mark 48 torpedo fired by the submarine Pasadena, which broke her in half.

== Gallery ==
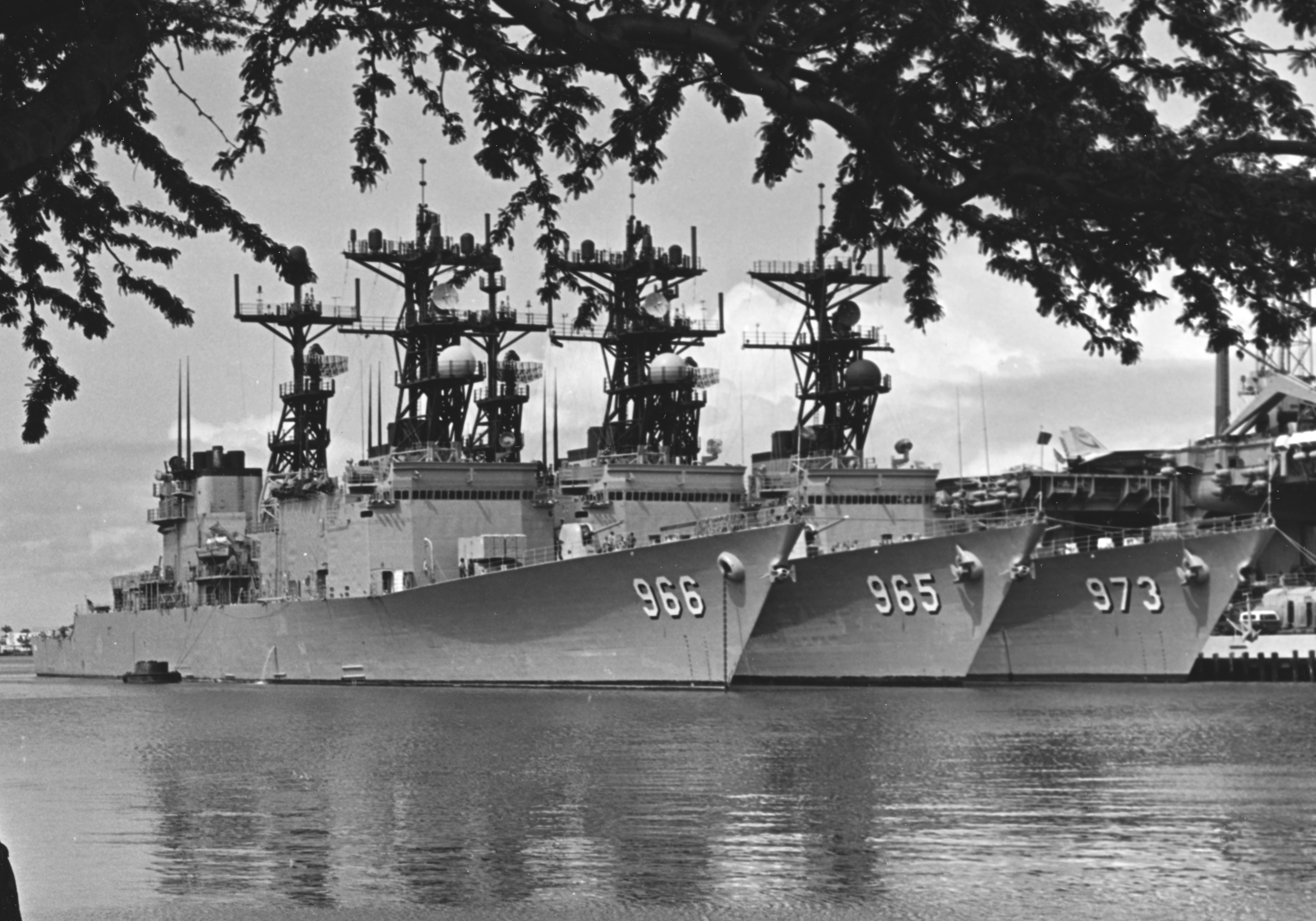
USS Hewitt, USS Kinkaid and USS John Young at Pearl Harbor in March 1980

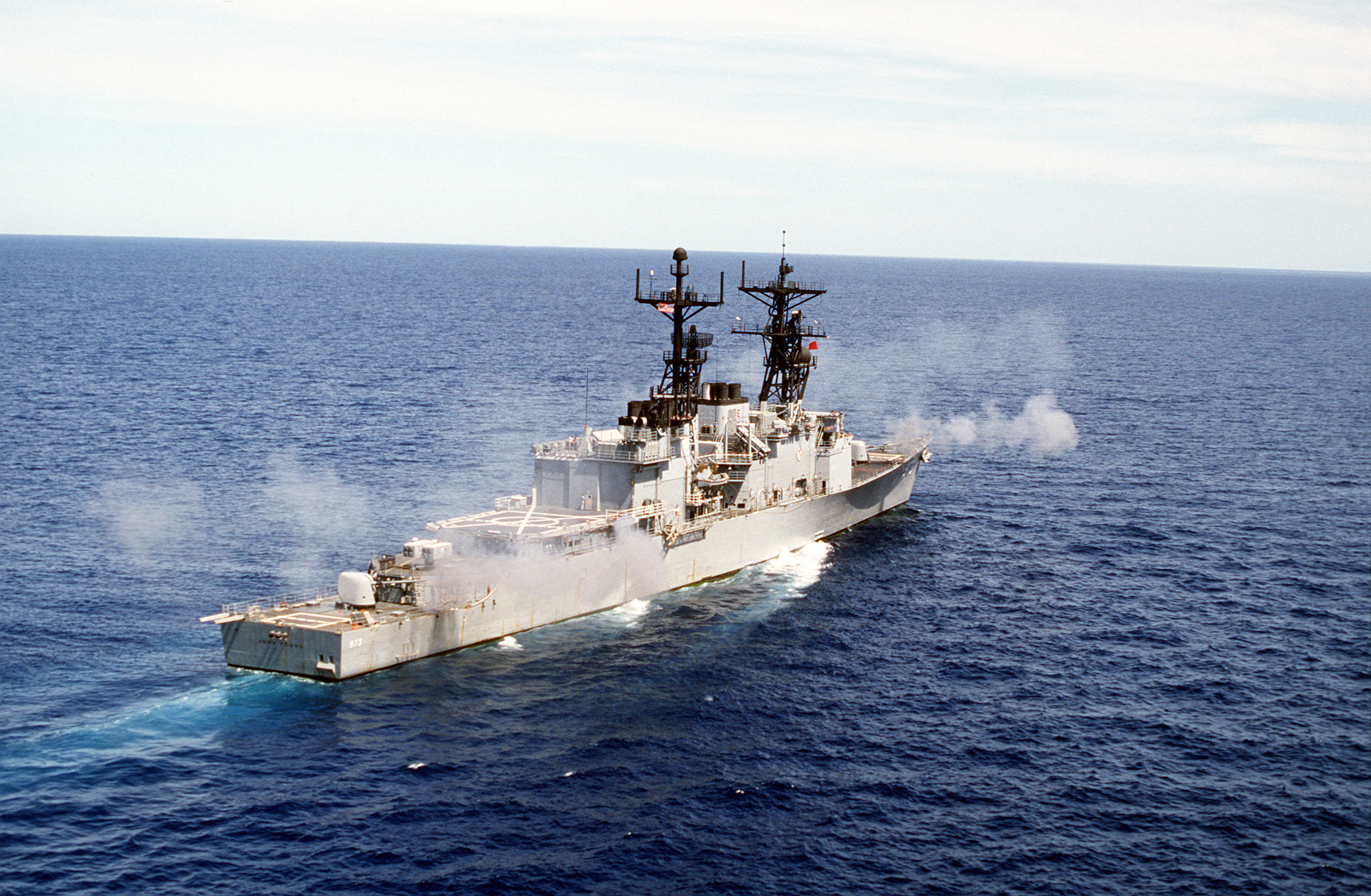
USS John Young on 1 May 1981

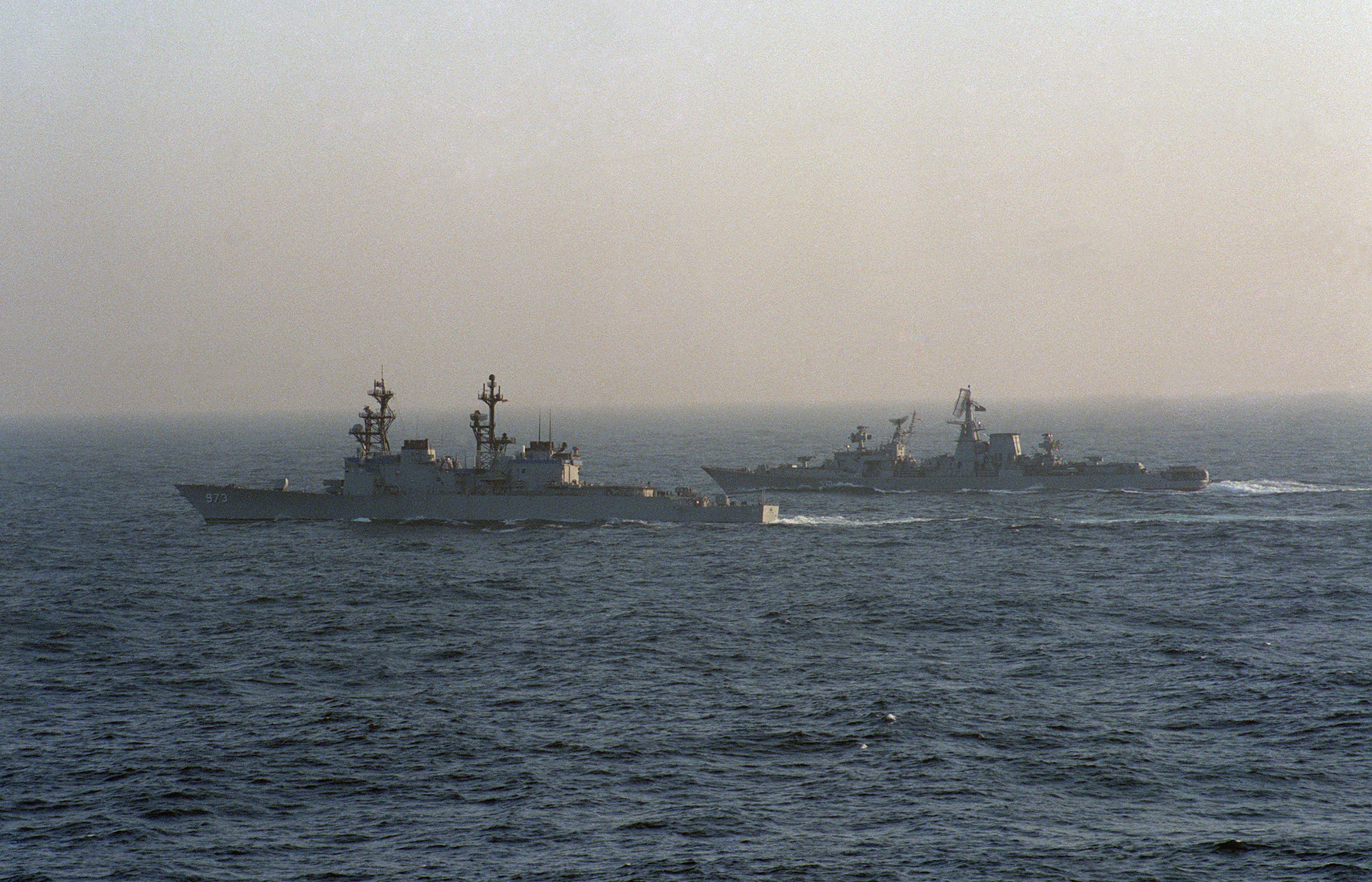
USS John Young and Tashkent in 1984

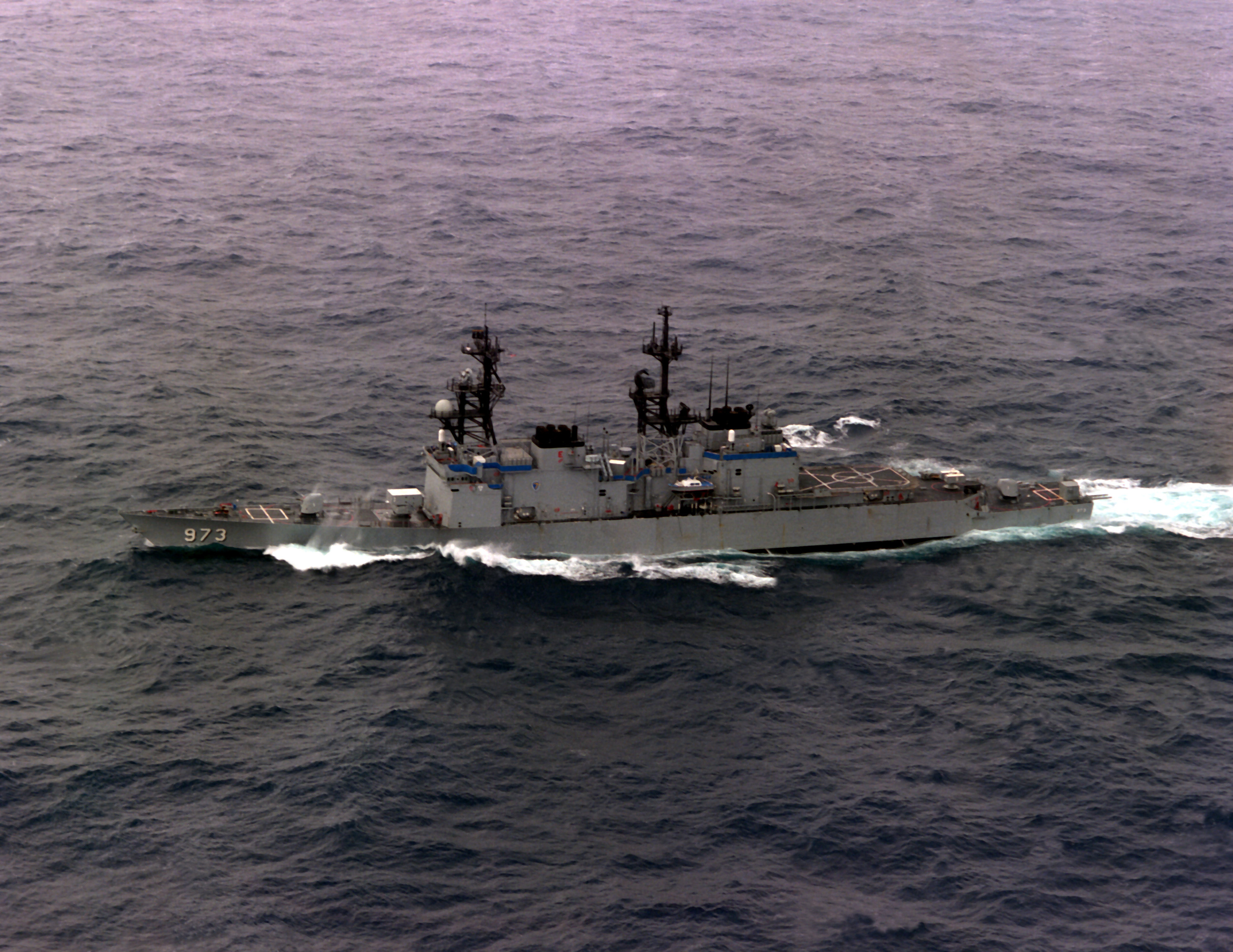
USS John Young on 26 August 1987

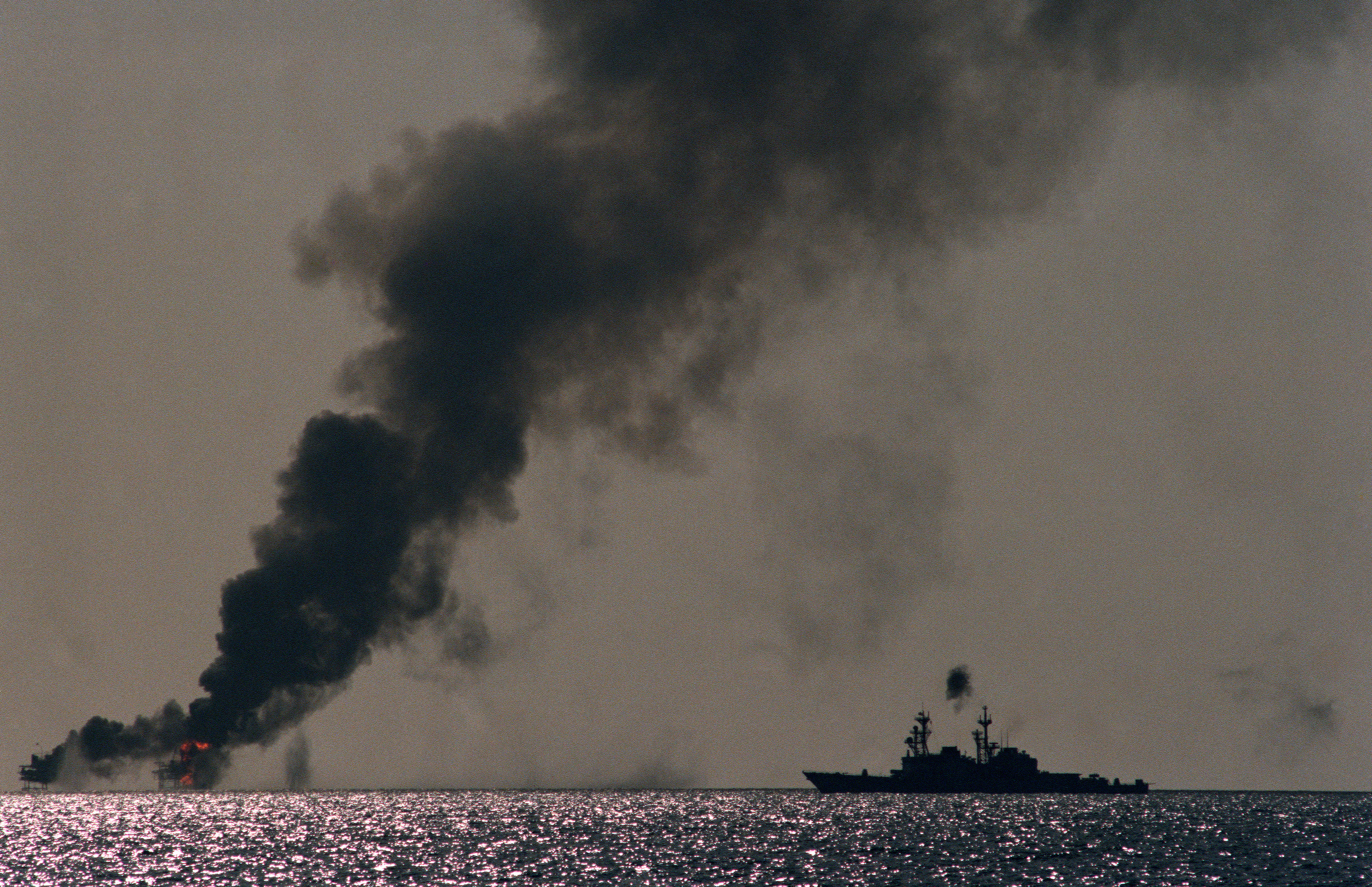
USS John Young on 19 October 1987

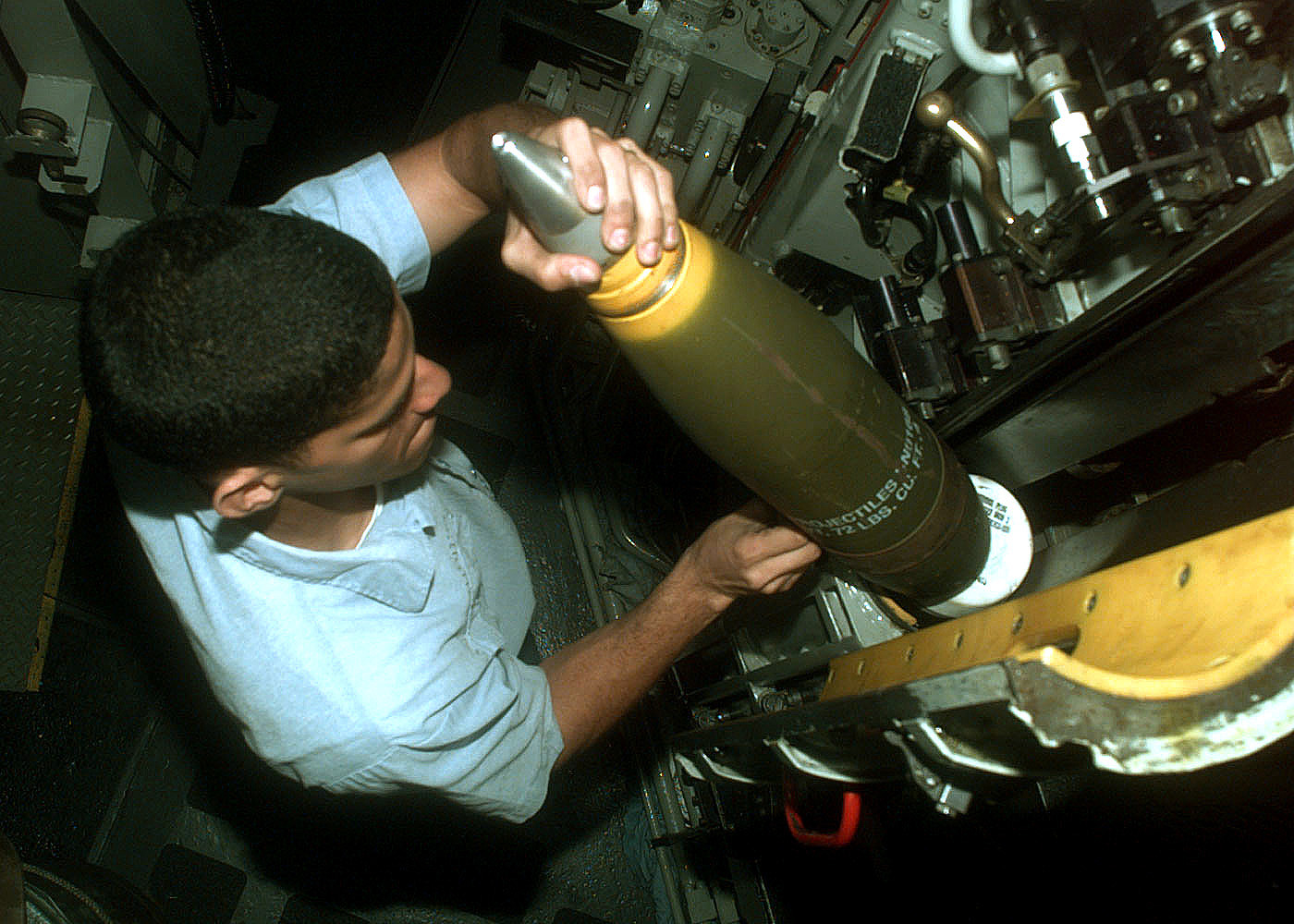
USS John Young's sailor loads a projectile into her 5-inch gun on 9 February 1998
