= Russian cruiser Tashkent =

Kara-class cruiser

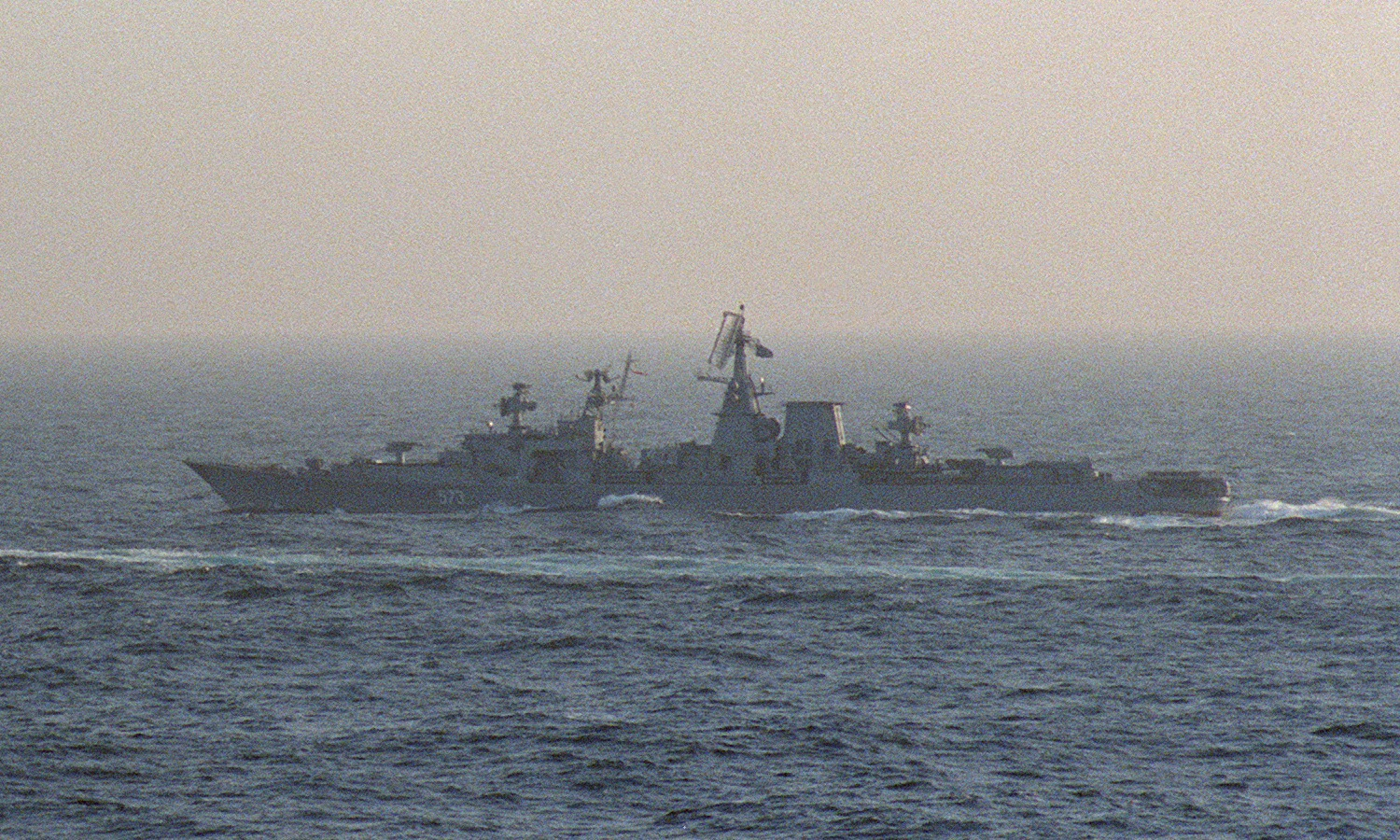
- Tashkent on 6 December 1984

History

Soviet Union
- Name: Tashkent; (Ташкент)
- Namesake: destroyer Tashkent
- Builder: 61 Communards Shipyard
- Laid down: 22 November 1974
- Launched: 5 November 1975
- Commissioned: 31 December 1977
- Decommissioned: 3 July 1992
- Stricken: 10 August 1994
- Home port: Sevastopol (1977-1978); Zolotoy Rog (1978-1994)
- Identification: 516, 528, 573, 716
- Fate: Scrapped, 1994

General characteristics
- Class & type: Kara-class cruiser
- Displacement: 8,200 tons standard; 9,700 tons full load
- Length: 173.2 m (568 ft)
- Beam: 18.6 m (61 ft)
- Draught: 6.7 m (22 ft)
- Propulsion: 2 shaft COGAG, 4 gas turbines, 120,000 hp (89 MW)
- Speed: 34 knots (63 km/h; 39 mph)
- Range: 9,000 nmi (17,000 km; 10,000 mi)
- Complement: 380-425
- Armament: 2 quad SS-N-14 Silex anti-submarine missiles; 2 twin SA-N-3 Goblet surface-to-air missile launchers (80 missiles); SA-N-4 Gecko surface-to-air missile launchers (40 missiles); 2 twin 76mm AK-726 dual purpose guns; 4 30mm AK-630 CIWS; 2 × 5 533 mm PTA-53-1134B torpedo tubes; 2 RBU-6000 anti-submarine rocket launchers; 2 RBU-1000 anti-submarine rocket launchers
- Aircraft carried: 1 Kamov Ka-25 'Hormone-A' or Kamov Ka-27 'Helix'
- Aviation facilities: Hangar and helipad

Tashkent was the sixth ship of the Kara-class cruisers of the Soviet Navy. She was launched in November 1975 and commissioned in December 1977 at the 61 Communards Shipyard. After the fall of the USSR, she was scrapped in India in 1994.

== Development and design ==
These ships were enlarged versions of the Kresta II class, with gas turbine engines replacing the steam turbines. These ships were fitted as flagships with improved command, control and communications facilities. These are dedicated ASW ships with significant anti-aircraft capability including both SA-N-3 and SA-N-4 surface-to-air missiles.

The specifications for the class were issued in 1964 with the design being finalised in the late 1960s. The gas turbine engine was chosen instead of steam for greater efficiency and quietness, and because the main Soviet gas turbine plant had a long association with the Nikolayev shipyards.

== Construction and career ==
Construction of the ship began on 22 November 1974 at the 61 Communards shipyard in Nikolaev. The ship was launched on 5 November 1975 and entered service on 31 December 1977. On 17 February 1978, it was included in the Russian Pacific Fleet.

From 24 February to 3 July 1979, as part of a detachment of ships of the aircraft carrier Minsk and Petropavlovsk made the transition from Sevastopol around Africa to Vladivostok, with the fulfillment of tasks combat service and business calls to Luanda, Maputo and Port Louis.

On 6 December 1984, Tashkent went on to screen USS Carl Vinson’s task force and sailed alongside USS John Young.

On 20 December 1988, it was delivered to Nikolaev for major repairs, but after the collapse of the USSR on 3 July 1992, it was expelled from the USSR Navy. On October 29 of the same year it was disbanded, on August 10, 1994, it was sent to India for scrap.

== Gallery ==
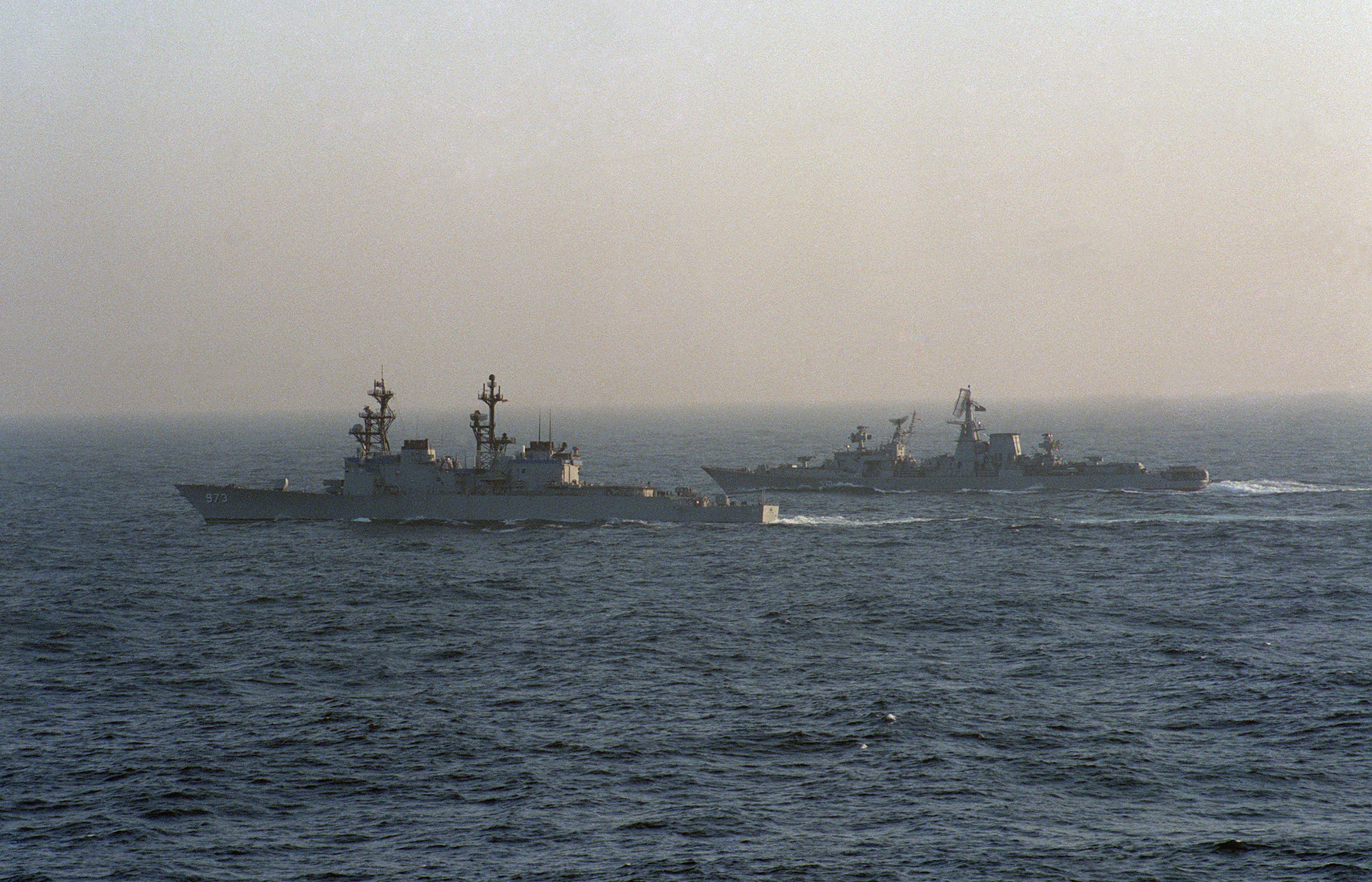
Tashkent alongside USS John Young on 6 December 1984.

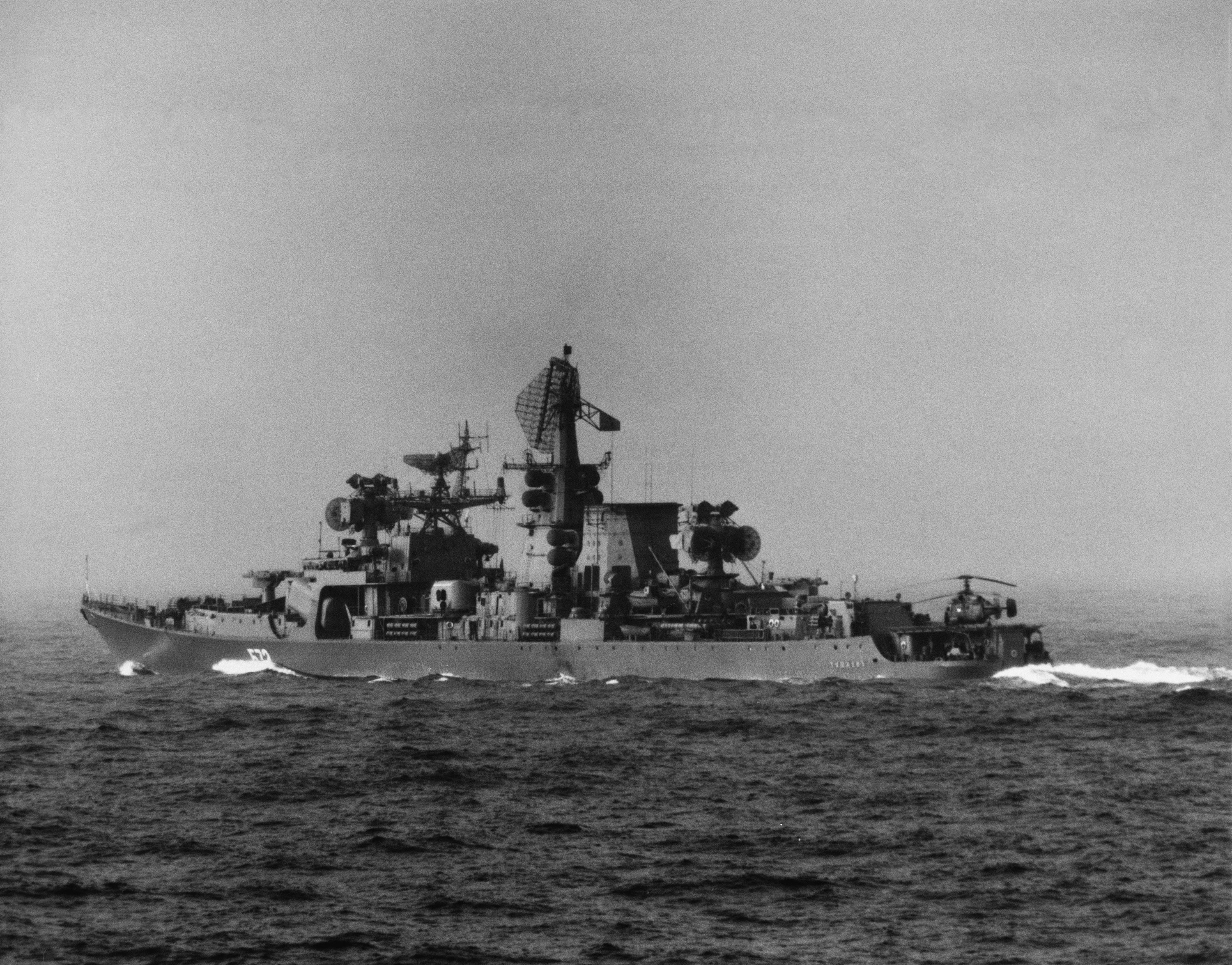
Tashkent underway in 1985.
