= Soviet cruiser Tallinn (1976) =

Kara-class cruiser

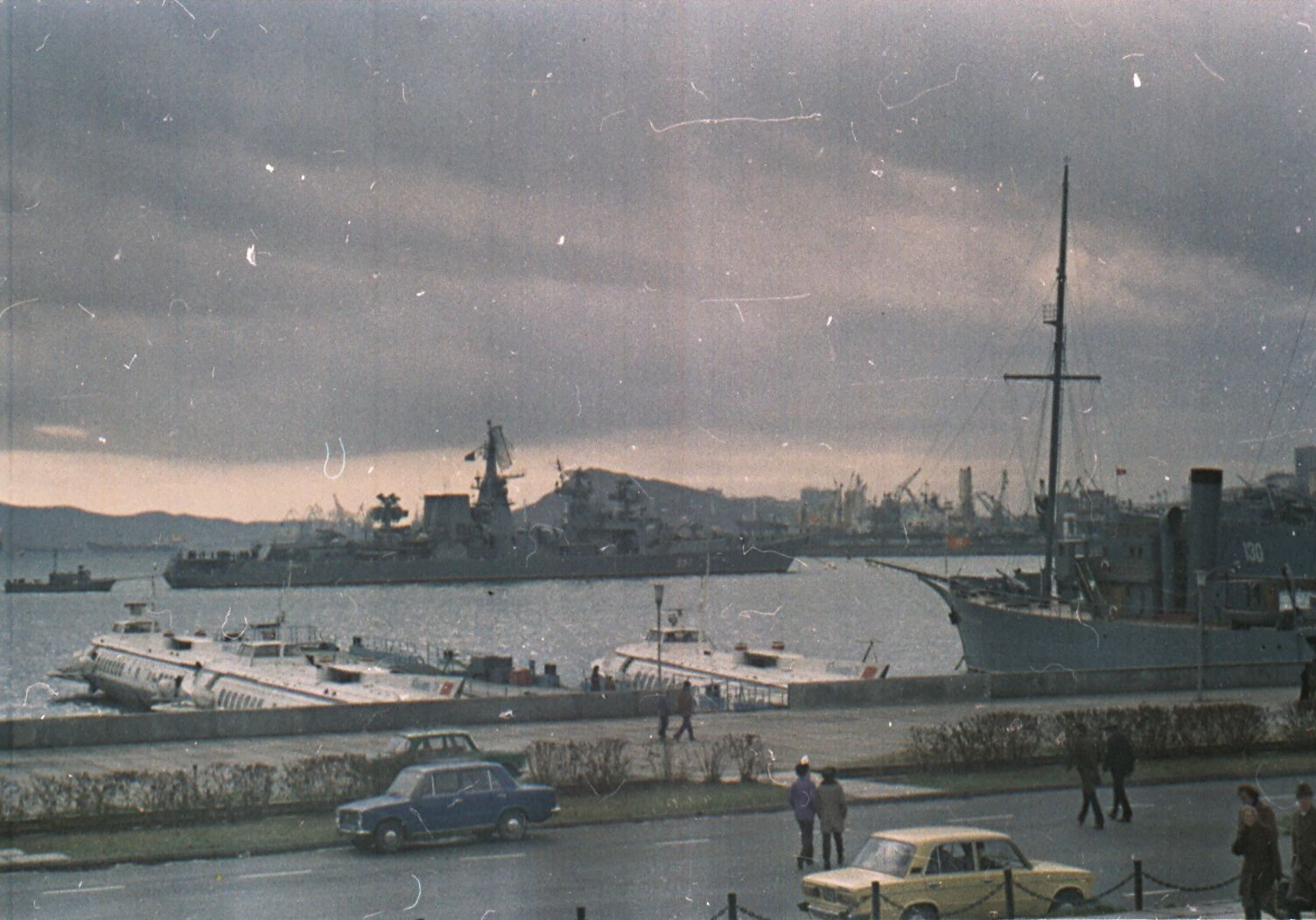
- Tallinn at Zolotoy Rog in November 1982

History

Soviet Union
- Name: Tallinn; (Таллин)
- Namesake: Tallinn; Vladivostok
- Builder: 61 Communards Shipyard
- Laid down: 5 November 1975
- Launched: 5 November 1976
- Commissioned: 31 December 1979
- Decommissioned: 5 July 1994
- Renamed: Vladivostok; (Владивосток)
- Stricken: May 1996
- Home port: Zolotoy Rog
- Identification: 531, 541, 547, 707
- Fate: Scrapped, 1996

General characteristics
- Class & type: Kara-class cruiser
- Displacement: 8,200 tons standard; 9,700 tons full load
- Length: 173.2 m (568 ft)
- Beam: 18.6 m (61 ft)
- Draught: 6.7 m (22 ft)
- Propulsion: 2 shaft COGAG, 4 gas turbines, 120,000 hp (89 MW)
- Speed: 34 knots (63 km/h; 39 mph)
- Range: 9,000 nmi (17,000 km; 10,000 mi)
- Complement: 380-425
- Armament: 2 quad SS-N-14 Silex anti-submarine missiles; 2 twin SA-N-3 Goblet surface-to-air missile launchers (80 missiles); SA-N-4 Gecko surface-to-air missile launchers (40 missiles); 2 twin 76mm AK-726 dual purpose guns; 4 30mm AK-630 CIWS; 2 × 5 533 mm PTA-53-1134B torpedo tubes; 2 RBU-6000 anti-submarine rocket launchers; 2 RBU-1000 anti-submarine rocket launchers
- Aircraft carried: 1 Kamov Ka-25 'Hormone-A' or Kamov Ka-27 'Helix'
- Aviation facilities: Hangar and helipad

Tallinn was the seventh ship of the Kara-class cruisers of the Soviet Navy. She was launched in November 1976 and commissioned in December 1979 at the 61 Communards Shipyard. She was renamed Vladivostok In 1992. After the fall of the USSR, she was scrapped in India in May 1996.

== Development and design ==
These ships were enlarged versions of the Kresta II class, with gas turbine engines replacing the steam turbines. These ships were fitted as flagships with improved command, control and communications facilities. These are dedicated ASW ships with significant anti-aircraft capability including both SA-N-3 and SA-N-4 surface-to-air missiles.

The specifications for the class were issued in 1964 with the design being finalised in the late 1960s. The gas turbine engine was chosen instead of steam for greater efficiency and quietness, and because the main Soviet gas turbine plant had a long association with the Nikolayev shipyards.

== Construction and career ==
Construction of the ship began on 22 November 1974 at the 61 Communards shipyard in Nikolaev. The ship was launched on 5 November 1975 and entered service on 31 December 1977. On 17 February 1978, it was included in the Russian Pacific Fleet.

From 13 to 17 December 1981, the ship visited Maputo and returned to the port of Victoria in the Seychelles. Tallinn was in the port until January 1982.

From 16 to 20 February 1984 visit to Massawa, Ethiopia.

On March 1, 1985, the ship was transferred to the 183rd BRPK. From 13 to 17 August 1985 visit to Wonsan (North Korea).

From 12 to 16 March 1986, she made a trip to Djibouti.

In January 1989, the ship was transferred to the 201st BRPK.

In 1990, the ship was put under repair at Dalzavod, which was later actually frozen.

Since March 1991, Tallinn was included in the 48th Anti-submarine Ships Division (DIPK).

In September 1992 it received a new name Vladivostok.

After the collapse of the USSR, on 5 July 1994, she was stricken, in May 1996 and sent to India for scrap.
