= Russian cruiser Petropavlovsk =

Kara-class cruiser

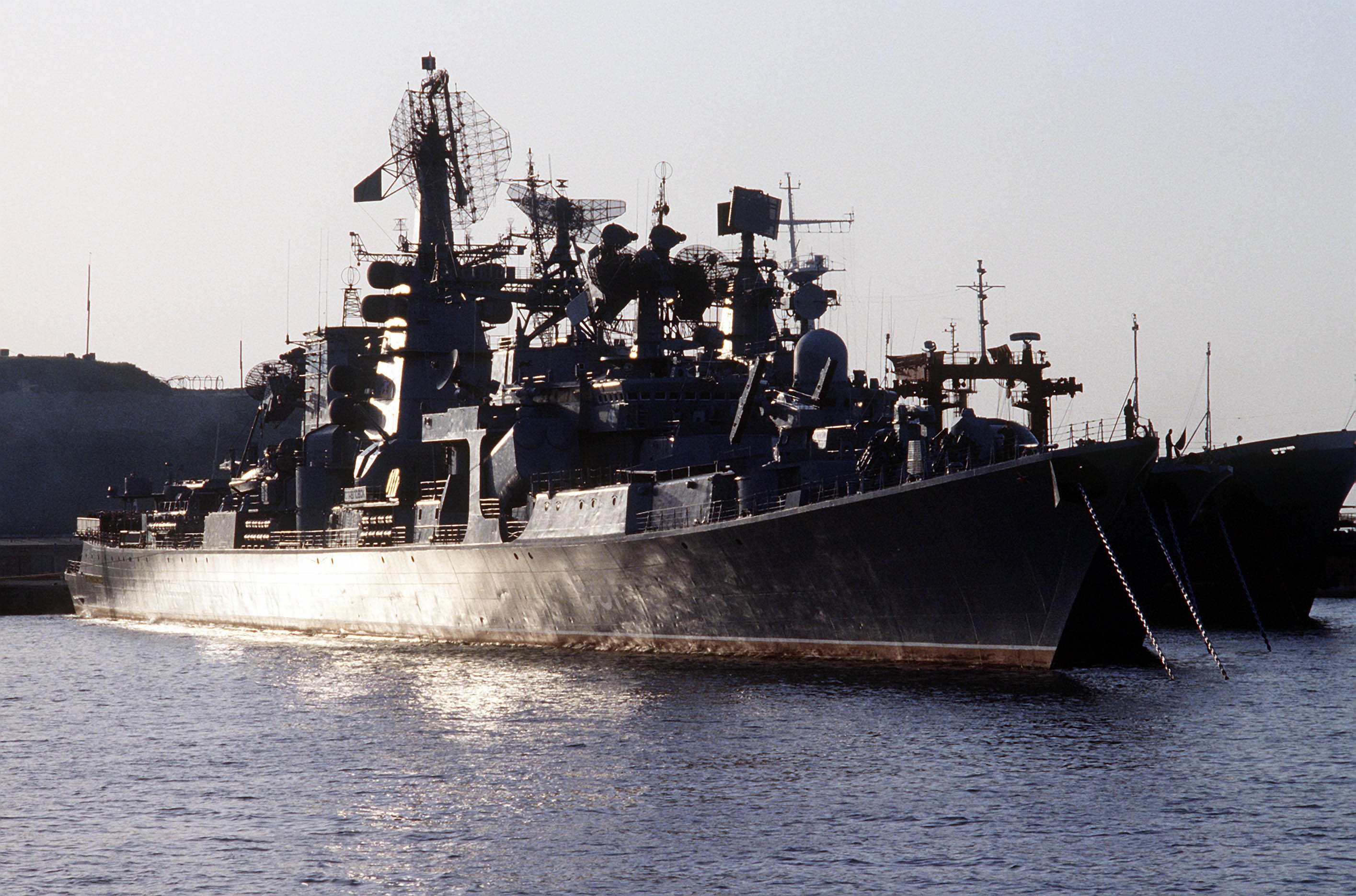
- Petropavlovsk on 20 September 1992

History

Soviet Union
- Name: Petropavlovsk; (Петропавловск)
- Namesake: Petropavlovsk
- Builder: 61 Communards Shipyard
- Laid down: 9 September 1973
- Launched: 22 November 1974
- Commissioned: 29 December 1976
- Decommissioned: 26 February 1992
- Stricken: June 1997
- Home port: Zolotoy Rog
- Identification: 518, 527, 558, 561, 565, 712, 732
- Fate: Scrapped, 1997

General characteristics
- Class & type: Kara-class cruiser
- Displacement: 8,200 tons standard; 9,700 tons full load
- Length: 173.2 m (568 ft)
- Beam: 18.6 m (61 ft)
- Draught: 6.7 m (22 ft)
- Propulsion: 2 shaft COGAG, 4 gas turbines, 120,000 hp (89 MW)
- Speed: 34 knots (63 km/h; 39 mph)
- Range: 9,000 nmi (17,000 km; 10,000 mi)
- Complement: 380-425
- Armament: 2 quad SS-N-14 Silex anti-submarine missiles; 2 twin SA-N-3 Goblet surface-to-air missile launchers (80 missiles); SA-N-4 Gecko surface-to-air missile launchers (40 missiles); 2 twin 76mm AK-726 dual purpose guns; 4 30mm AK-630 CIWS; 2 × 5 533 mm PTA-53-1134B torpedo tubes; 2 RBU-6000 anti-submarine rocket launchers; 2 RBU-1000 anti-submarine rocket launchers
- Aircraft carried: 1 Kamov Ka-25 'Hormone-A' or Kamov Ka-27 'Helix'
- Aviation facilities: Hangar and helipad

Petropavlovsk was the fifth ship of the Kara-class cruisers of the Soviet Navy. She was launched in November 1975 and commissioned in December 1976 at the 61 Communards Shipyard. In 1996, she was scrapped in India.

== Development and design ==
These ships were enlarged versions of the Kresta II class, with gas turbine engines replacing the steam turbines. These ships were fitted as flagships with improved command, control and communications facilities. These are dedicated ASW ships with significant anti-aircraft capability including both SA-N-3 and SA-N-4 surface-to-air missiles.

The specifications for the class were issued in 1964 with the design being finalised in the late 1960s. The gas turbine engine was chosen instead of steam for greater efficiency and quietness, and because the main Soviet gas turbine plant had a long association with the Nikolayev shipyards.

== Construction and career ==
Construction of the ship began on 9 September 1973 at the 61 Communards shipyard in Nikolaev. The ship was launched on 22 November 1974 and entered service on 29 December 1976. On 5 February 1977 it was included in the Russian Pacific Fleet.

From 24 February to 3 July 1979, as part of a detachment of ships of the aircraft carrier Minsk and Tashkent made the transition from Sevastopol around Africa to Vladivostok, with the fulfillment of tasks combat service and business calls to Luanda, Maputo and Port Louis.

In 1980, the ship's crew was awarded the pennant of the USSR Minister of Defense for courage and military valor shown in sea voyages while performing combat service. The ship housed the headquarters of the operation to recover the wreckage of the South Korean Boeing, shot down on 1 September 1983 near Moneron Island.

In June 1994 she was withdrawn from the fleet. On August 30 of the same year, she was transferred to the 44th brigade of anti-submarine ships, formed on the basis of 48 DIPK and 201 brigades of anti-submarine ships 10 OPESK of the Russian Pacific Fleet, based in the Golden Horn Bay.

In 1996, the ship was disarmed, on May 26, 1997, it was withdrawn from the Navy, in June of the same year it was sent in tow to India for scrap.

== Gallery ==
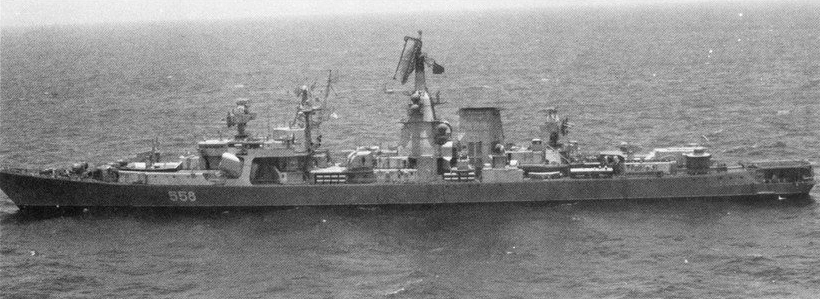
Petropavlovsk underway in 1980.

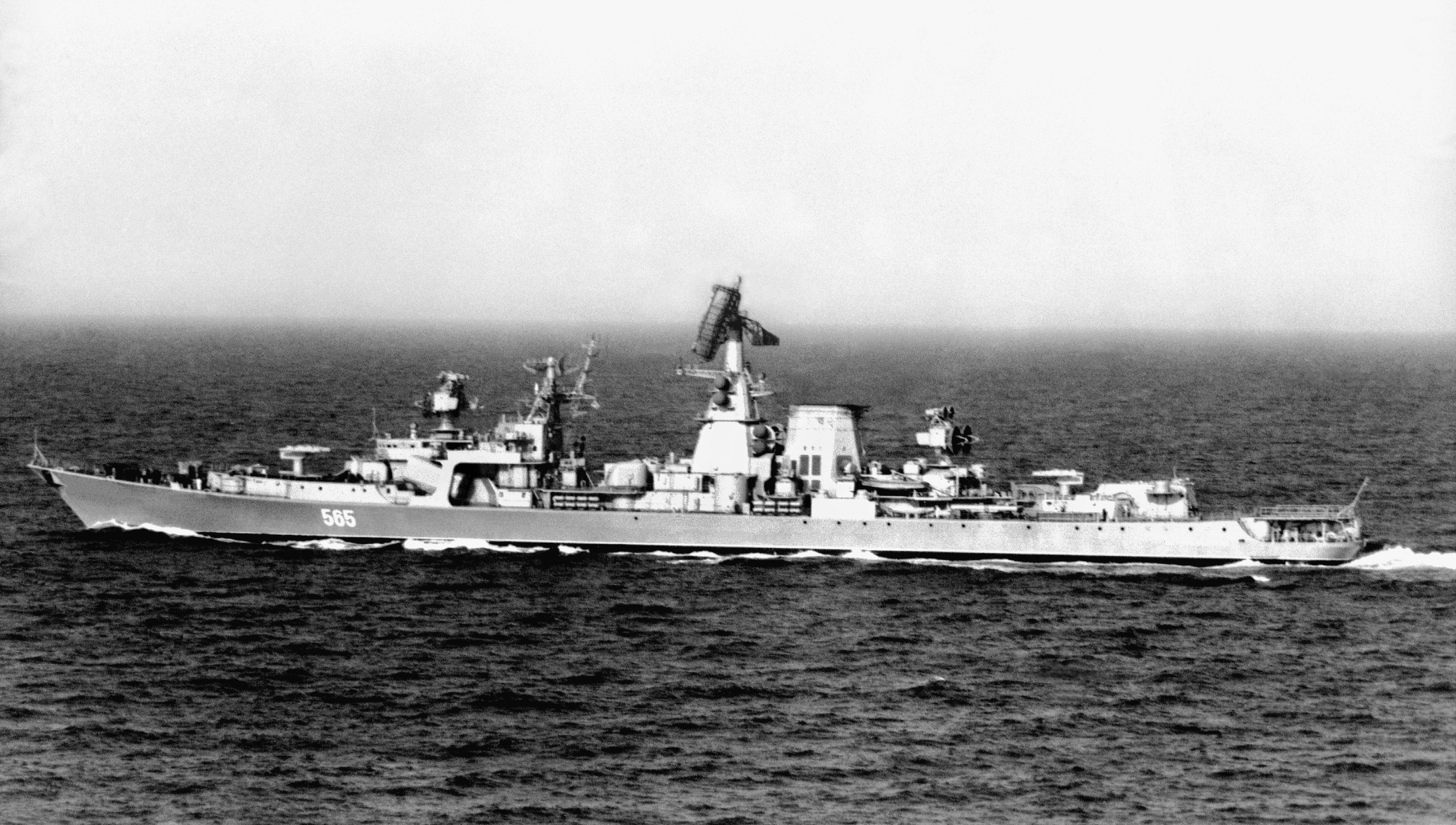
Petropavlovsk underway in November 1981.

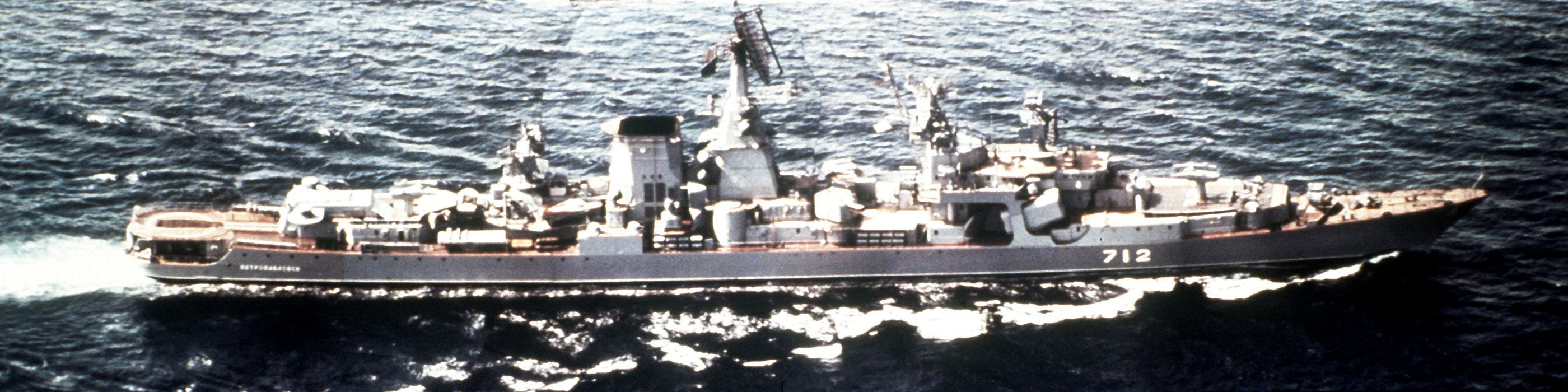
Petropavlovsk underway in May 1982.

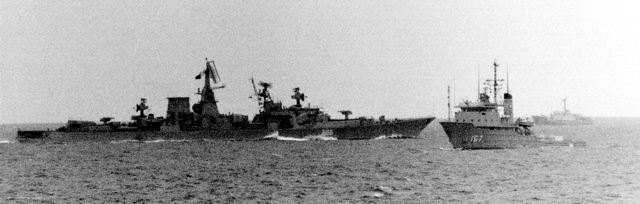
Petropavlovsk underway in 1983.

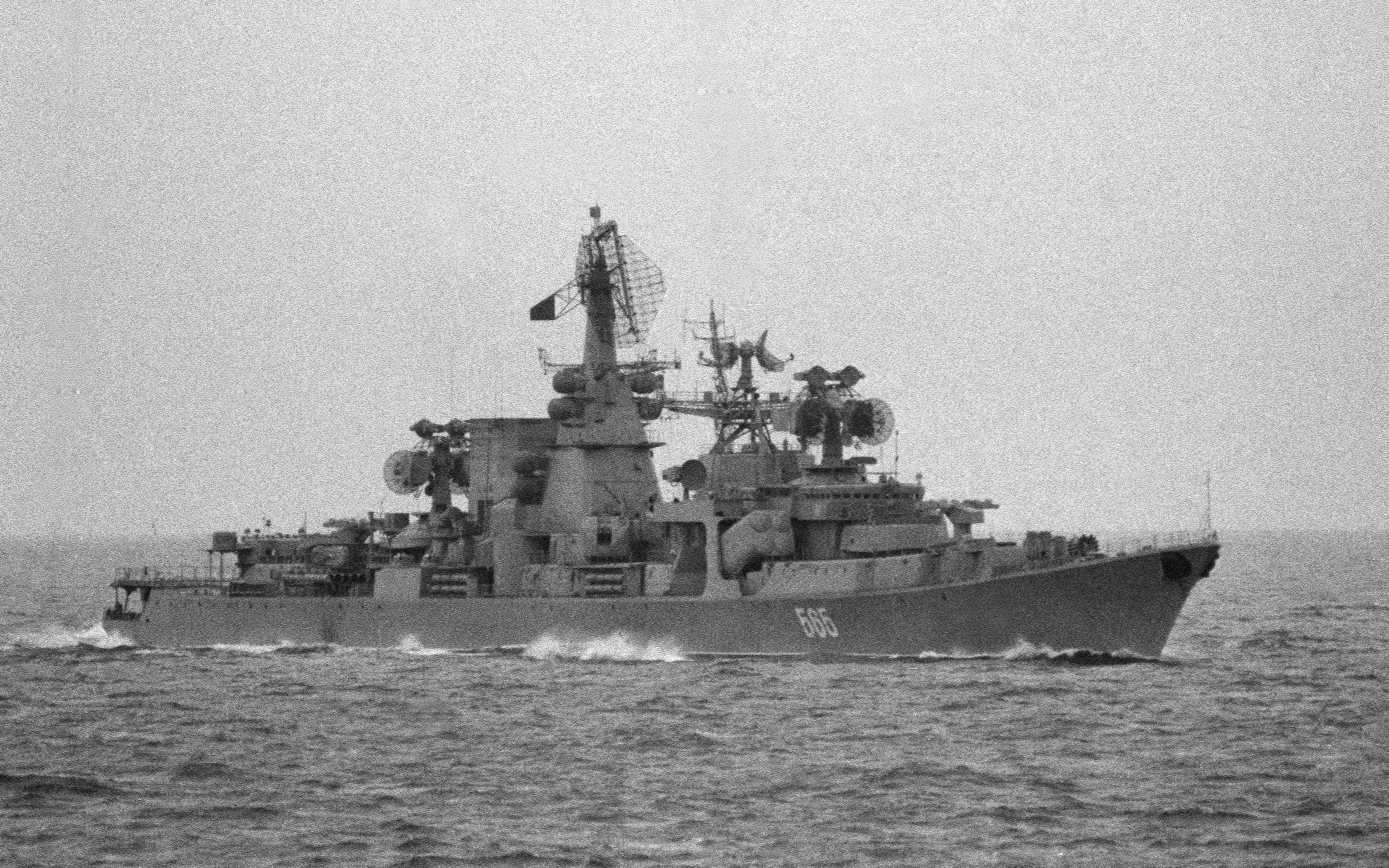
Petropavlovsk underway on 17 September 1983.

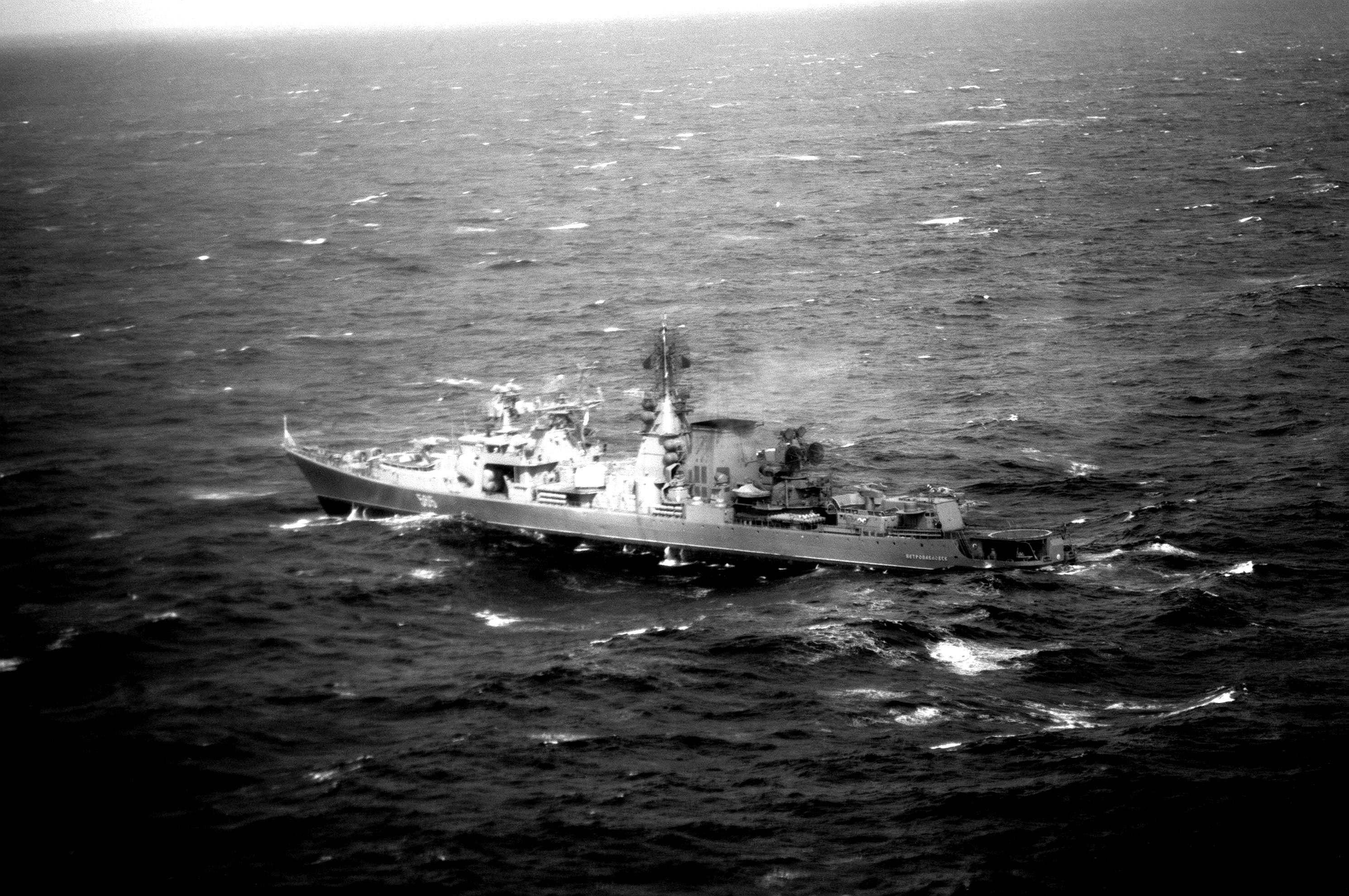
Petropavlovsk underway on 21 March 1984.

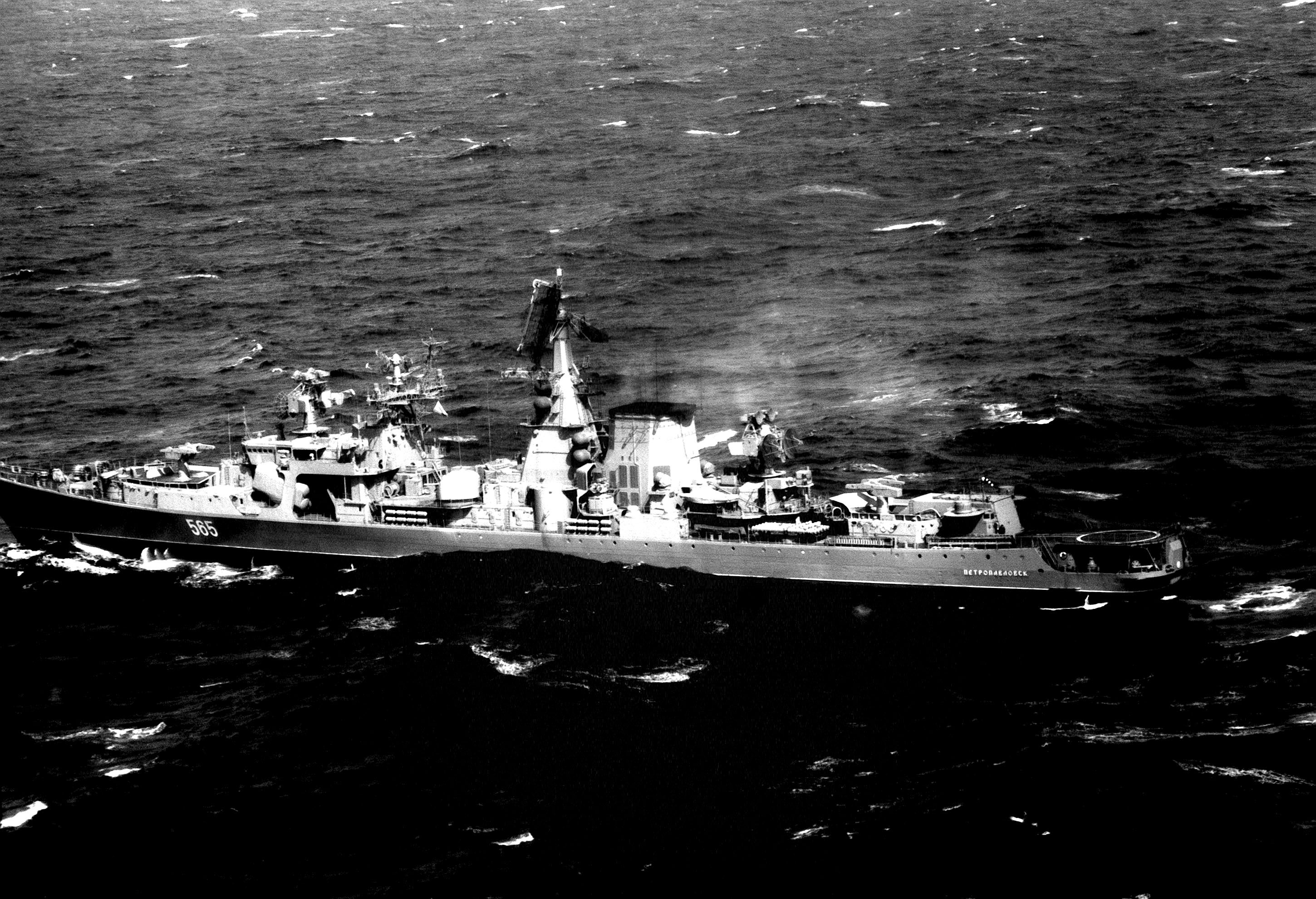
Petropavlovsk underway on 21 March 1984.

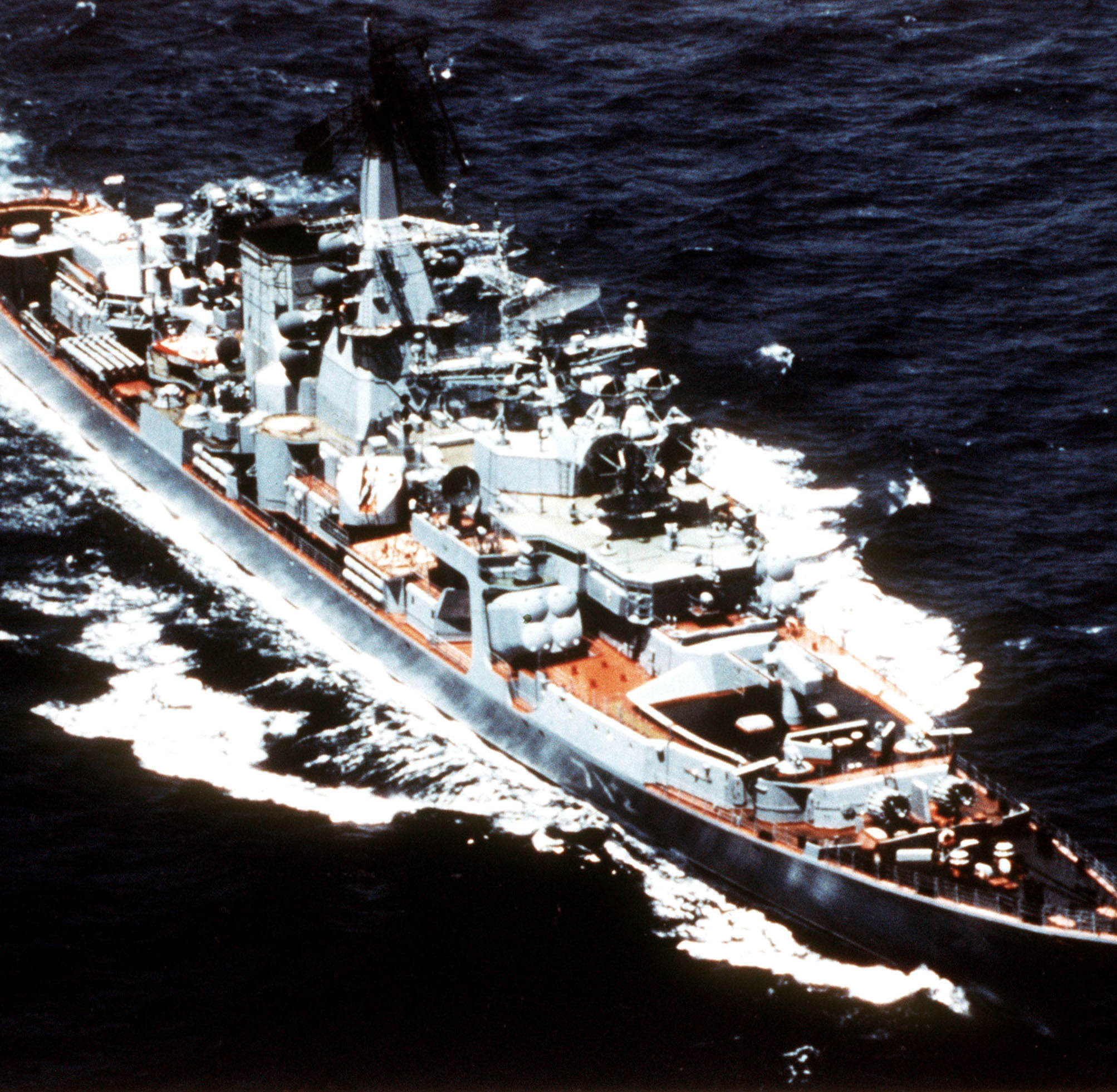
Petropavlovsk underway on 23 May 1984.
