= Russian cruiser Kerch =

Kara-class missile cruiser of Russian Navy

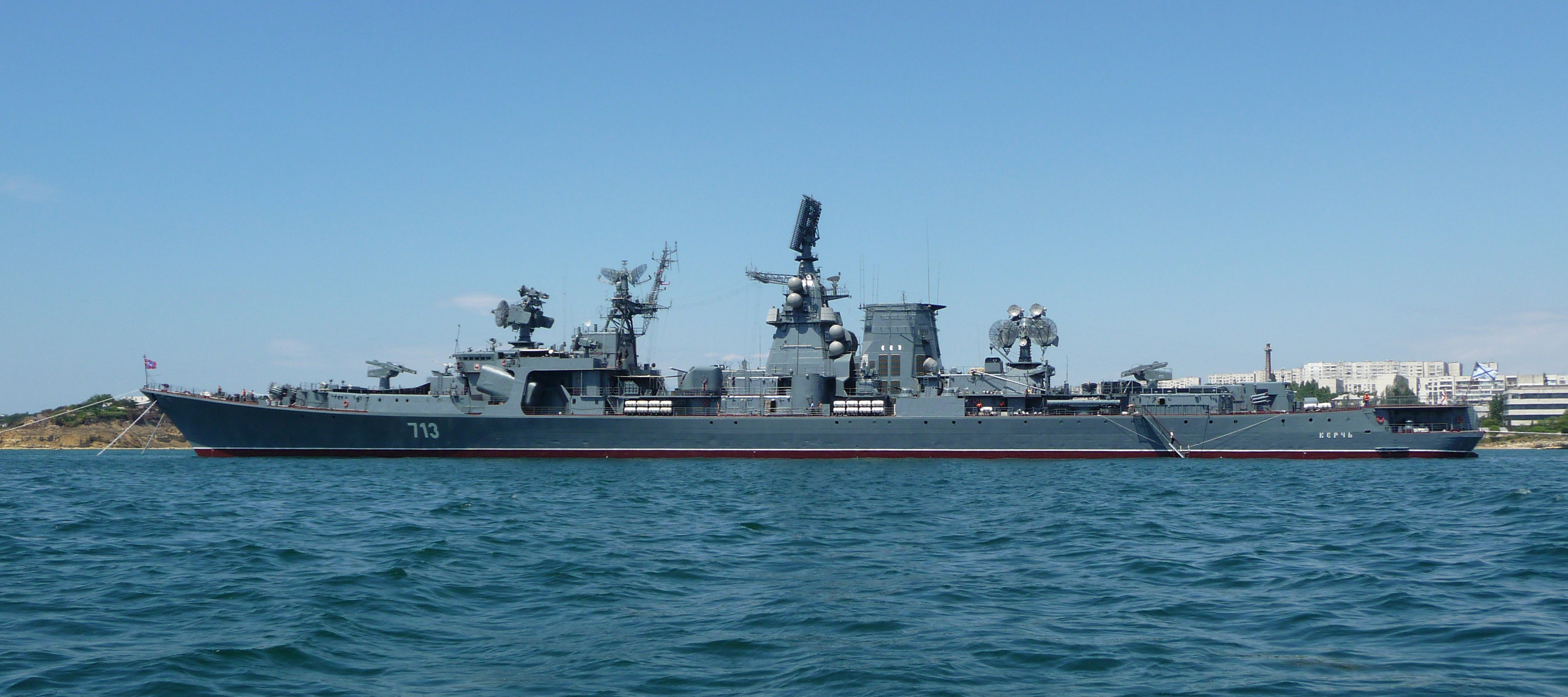
- Kerch in Sevastopol Bay, 2009

History

Russia
- Name: Kerch
- Namesake: Hero City Kerch
- Builder: 61 Communards Shipyard
- Laid down: 30 April 1971
- Launched: 21 July 1972
- Commissioned: 25 December 1974
- Decommissioned: 15 February 2020
- Out of service: 4 November 2014
- Identification: 713
- Fate: Scrapped 14 April 2020

General characteristics
- Class & type: Kara-class cruiser
- Displacement: 8,900 tons
- Length: 173.4 m (568.9 ft)
- Beam: 18.5 m (60.7 ft)
- Draft: 5.4 m (17.7 ft)
- Propulsion: 4 turbine-type generators GTG-12,5A x1250 kW; 1 turbine-type generator GTG-6M 600 kW
- Speed: 32 knots (59 km/h; 37 mph)
- Range: 9,000 nmi (17,000 km; 10,000 mi)
- Complement: 425
- Armament: 2 quad SS-N-14 Silex anti-submarine missiles; 2 twin SA-N-3 Goblet surface-to-air missile launchers (80 missiles); SA-N-4 Gecko surface-to-air missile launchers (40 missiles); 2 twin 76mm AK-726 dual purpose guns; 4 30mm AK-630 CIWS; 2 × 5 533 mm PTA-53-1134B torpedo tubes; 2 RBU-6000 anti-submarine rocket launchers; 2 RBU-1000 anti-submarine rocket launchers
- Aircraft carried: 1 Kamov Ka-25

Kerch (Керчь) was a Kara-class missile cruiser of the Soviet and later Russian Navy. She served as part of the Black Sea Fleet. The ship was scrapped in 2020 following a large fire which broke out on 4 November 2014.

== History ==
Kerch was laid down in the Soviet Union on 30 April 1971, launched on 21 July 1972 and was commissioned in the Soviet Black Sea Fleet on 25 December 1974. The ship was constructed in the 61 Kommunar Shipyard at Nikolayev (Mykolaiv) on the Black Sea. She was in service with the Soviet Fleet until 1991, and then joined its successor, Russian Navy.

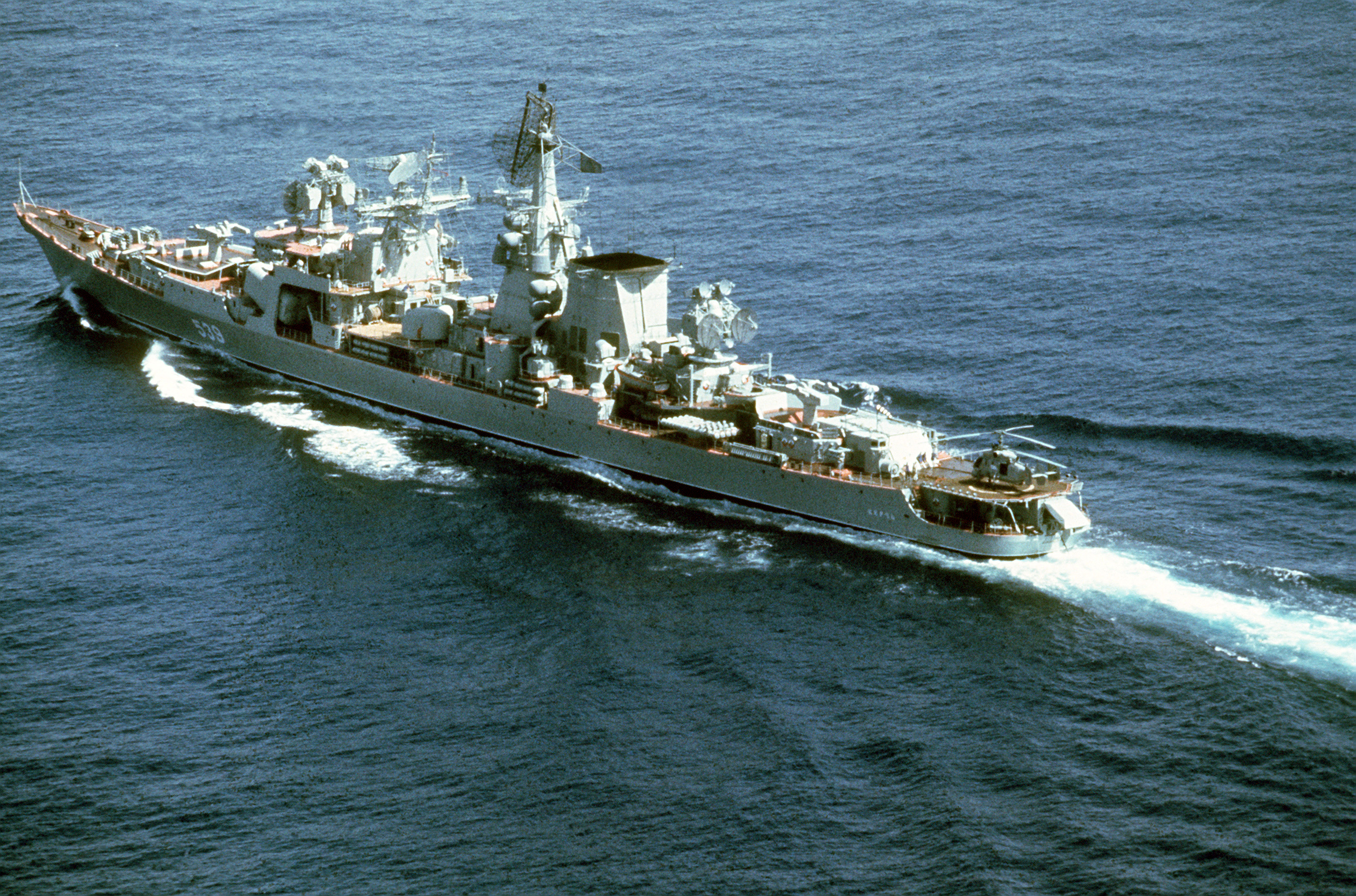
Kerch in 1986 as part of the Soviet navy.

On 4 November 2014 a fire broke out aboard the ship during a routine servicing in Sevastopol. According to officials nobody was injured and the fire was contained to the ship's aft. On April 24, 2020, the ship was towed away from her dock for the scrapyard. Satellite images published in Google Earth show several stages of the ship's demolition in Inkerman (44.608°N 33.599°E) between May and the end of 2020.

== In popular culture ==
In a naval sea battle game (Modern Warships) it is featured as an Epic Class Cruiser.
