= Kara-class cruiser =

Class of Guided missile cruisers of the Soviet later Russian navy

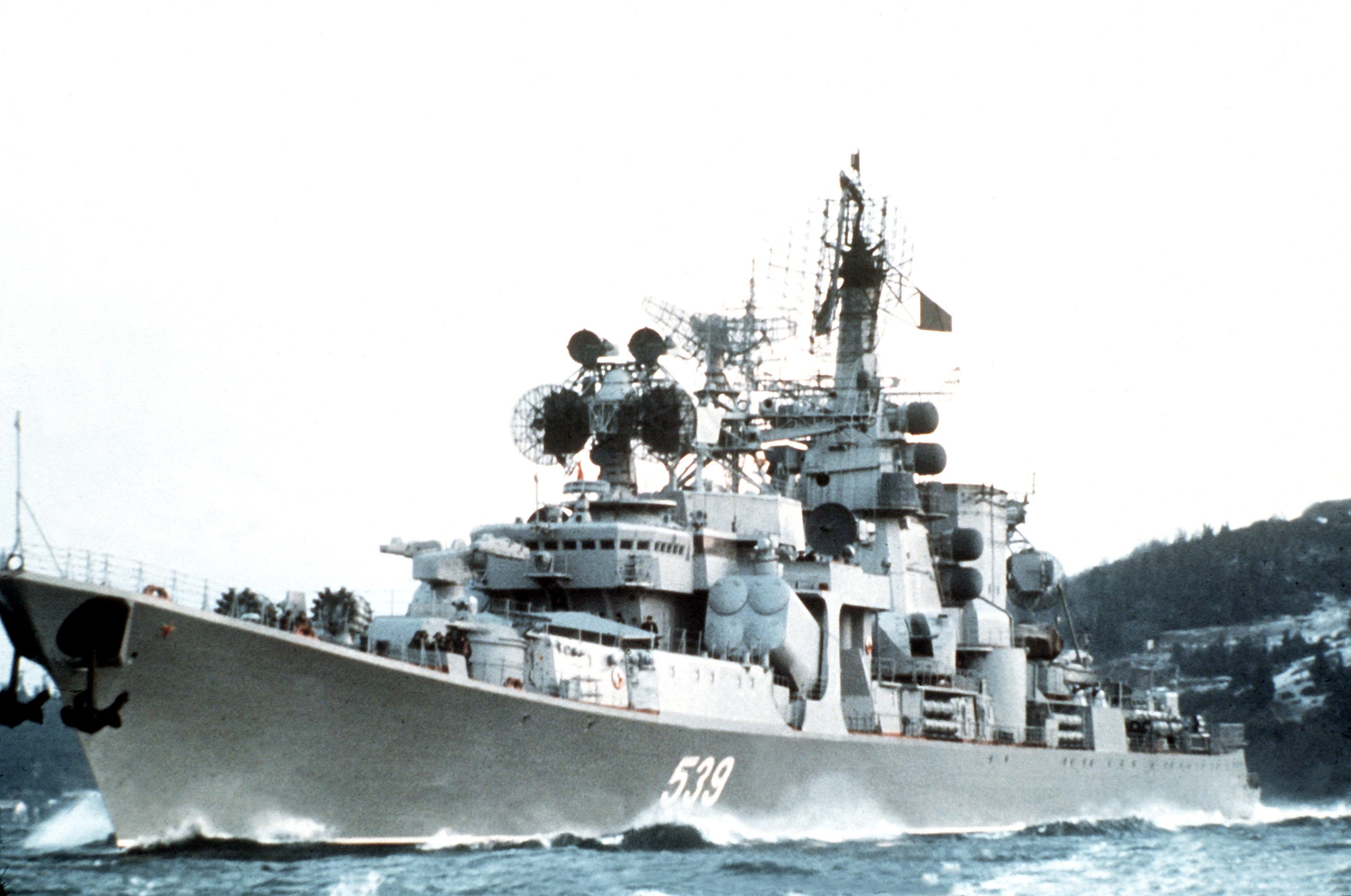
- A Kara-class cruiser underway c. 1982

Class overview
- Name: Kara class
- Builders: 61 Communards Shipyard, Nikolayev
- Operators: Soviet Navy; Russian Navy
- Preceded by: Kresta II class
- Succeeded by: Kirov class; Slava class
- Built: 1968–1979
- In commission: 1971–2020
- Completed: 7
- Retired: 7

General characteristics
- Type: Guided missile cruiser
- Displacement: 8,200 tons standard; 9,700 tons full load
- Length: 173.2 m (568 ft 3 in)
- Beam: 18.6 m (61 ft 0 in)
- Draught: 6.7 m (22 ft 0 in)
- Propulsion: 2 shaft COGAG, 4 × DN59 2x DS71 gas turbines, 120,000 hp (89,000 kW)
- Speed: 34 knots (63 km/h; 39 mph)
- Range: 9,000 nmi (17,000 km)
- Complement: 380
- Sensors & processing systems: MR-600 'Voskhod' air-search radar; MR-310 A 'Angara' air/surface-search radar; MG-332 'Titan-2'/'Titan-2 T' under keel sonar; MG-325 'Vega' variable depth sonar; 3R41 Volna (Azov)
- Electronic warfare & decoys: MRP-150 Gurzuf; R-740; R-143
- Armament: 2 × quad Metel Anti-Ship Complex anti-submarine missiles; 2 × twin M-11 Shtorm surface-to-air missile launchers (80 missiles); 2 x twin 9K33 Osa surface-to-air missile launchers (40 missiles); 2 × twin 76 mm (3 in) AK-726 naval guns; 4 × 30 mm (1 in) AK-630 CIWS; 2 × 5 533 mm (21 in) PTA-53-1134B torpedo tubes; 2 × RBU-6000 anti-submarine rocket launchers; 2 × RBU-1000 anti-submarine rocket launchers; 24 × S-300F surface-to-air missiles (Azov)
- Aircraft carried: 1 × Ka-25PL helicopter
- Aviation facilities: Helipad and recessed hangar

The Kara class, Soviet designation Project 1134B Berkut B ("golden eagle"), was a class of guided missile cruisers ("large anti-submarine warfare ship" in Soviet classification) built for the Soviet Navy between 1968 and 1976. NATO classified the type as cruisers mainly due to their size and the presence of the 'Metel' (SS-N-14 Silex) anti-ship missile system, capable of striking both submarines and surface vessels.

== Development ==
The Kara-class cruisers were originally designed as an iteration on the Kresta II class. They were based on the same initial technical drawings, but were modified to include a gas turbine power plant, an enhanced anti-aircraft (AA) armament, and improved artillery systems. This included the addition of the navalized 4K33 'Osa-M' surface-to-air missile system, and the replacement of the AK-725 artillery systems with AK-726 systems. Anti-submarine warfare (ASW) and sensors systems remained the same, but modernized communication systems were added later in the design process.

While based on the same hull as the Kresta class, the addition of various systems required a significant increase in size. The hull length increased by 12 metres (39 ft), and the beam by 0.6 metres (2.0 ft), allowing for the superstructure to be increased in volume. The specifications for the class were issued in 1964 with the design being finalised in the late 1960s.

The 61 Communards shipyard in Mykolaiv (Nikolayev) was selected to construct the class, due primarily to previous experience with gas turbines and proximity to the main Soviet gas turbine plant. Initial trials by the lead ship, Nikolayev, required alterations to the gas generator intakes due to water ingestion, and the addition of redundant air compressors for control.

Azov was constructed as a trials ship for the S-300 missile system and was also fitted with the associated 3R41 Volna (Top Dome) radar. During the Cold War she was confined to the Black Sea.

== Design ==
=== Armament ===
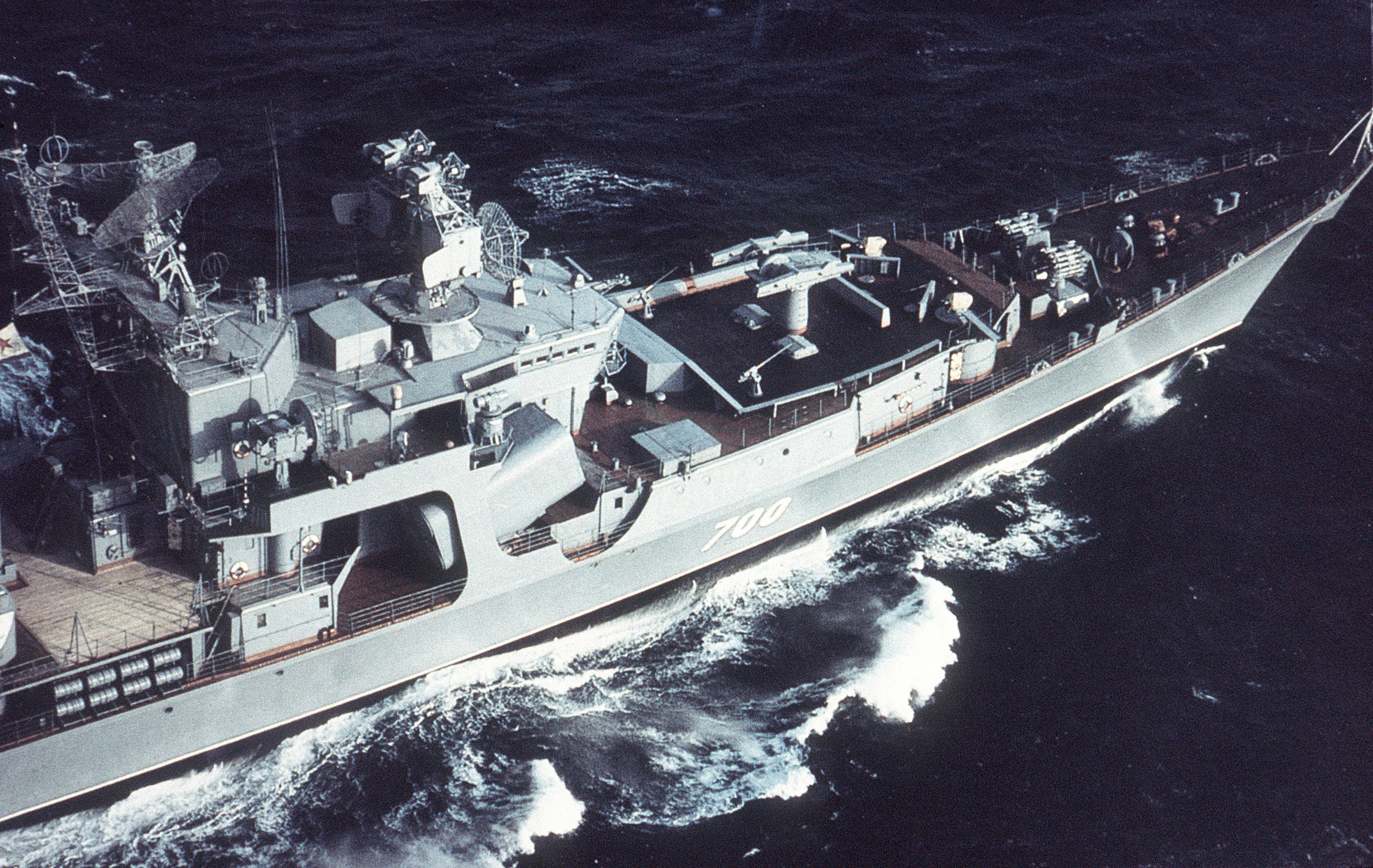
A bow view of Nikolayev, with Metel, M-11, and RBU-6000 launchers visible.

The primary AA armament of the Kara-class consisted of M-11 'Shtorm' surface-to-air missiles. These were initially designed for destroying aircraft at higher altitudes, but were modernized throughout the 1970s and 1980s to increase performance against low flying aircraft and cruise missiles. 4K33 Osa-M missiles were equipped for shorter range air defence against low flying aircraft or missiles. These operated off an independent radar system from the M-11, but could receive cueing from the main search radars.

In the ASW role, the Kara class was primarily armed with the URPK-3 'Metel' complex. This consisted of an AT-2U torpedo mounted to an 85R cruise missile, and was designed to allow for the engagement of submarine contacts up to 50 kilometres (31 mi) away. This was achieved by using the cruise missile to fly the torpedo out to the target area, at which point it would detach and begin locating a target. This was intended to be used alongside target information from other fleet elements, such as friendly warships or ASW aircraft. Each ship carried eight 85R/UPRK-3 missiles, within two angled box launchers on either side of the bridge.

The ships were also equipped with two RBU-6000 launchers on the bow, and two RBU-1000 launchers on the stern. These were designed to saturate a target area with several rocket-launched anti-submarine bomblets. The standard torpedo armament consisted of two five-tube torpedo launchers to the left and right of the forecastle. These typically carried six 53-65K torpedoes for anti-ship use, and four SET-65 torpedoes for ASW use.

The Kara-class cruisers carried two AK-726 cannons for AA and anti-surface use. Four AK-630 rotary cannons mounted to the aft were included for point defence of the ship, and could be radar directed or manually aimed, via a gunsight.

=== Sensors ===
The main air search radar used on the Kara-class was the MR-600 'Voskhod', located on top of the main mast. This system formed the core of the cruiser's air search system, with an antenna size of 7.15 by 6.3 metres (23.5 by 20.7 ft), and an equipment weight of about 10 tons. This system was complemented by the MR-310 A 'Angara' air/surface search radar, which also operated as a backup air search radar in case of equipment failure.

Fire control for the M-11 'Shtorm' missiles, and guidance for the URPK-3 'Metel' ASW complex was provided by two 4R-60M 'Grom-M' universal fire control systems. These systems integrated tracking radars and guidance antennae, and were mounted above the bridge, and behind the smokestack. Guidance for the Osa-M missiles was provided by a separate set of two 4R-33 fire control systems, which were mounted on opposite sides of the bridge.

Sonar systems consisted of the MG-332 'Titan-2' under-keel sonar, which was capable of both active and passive operation. This was mounted in a large, flood bulge on the bow of the ship. Beginning with Kerch, these were replaced with updated MG-332 Titan-2 T sonars. An MG-325 'Vega' variable-depth sonar was mounted in a door at the stern, and was capable of diving down to 100 metres (330 ft) below the ship.

=== Aircraft ===
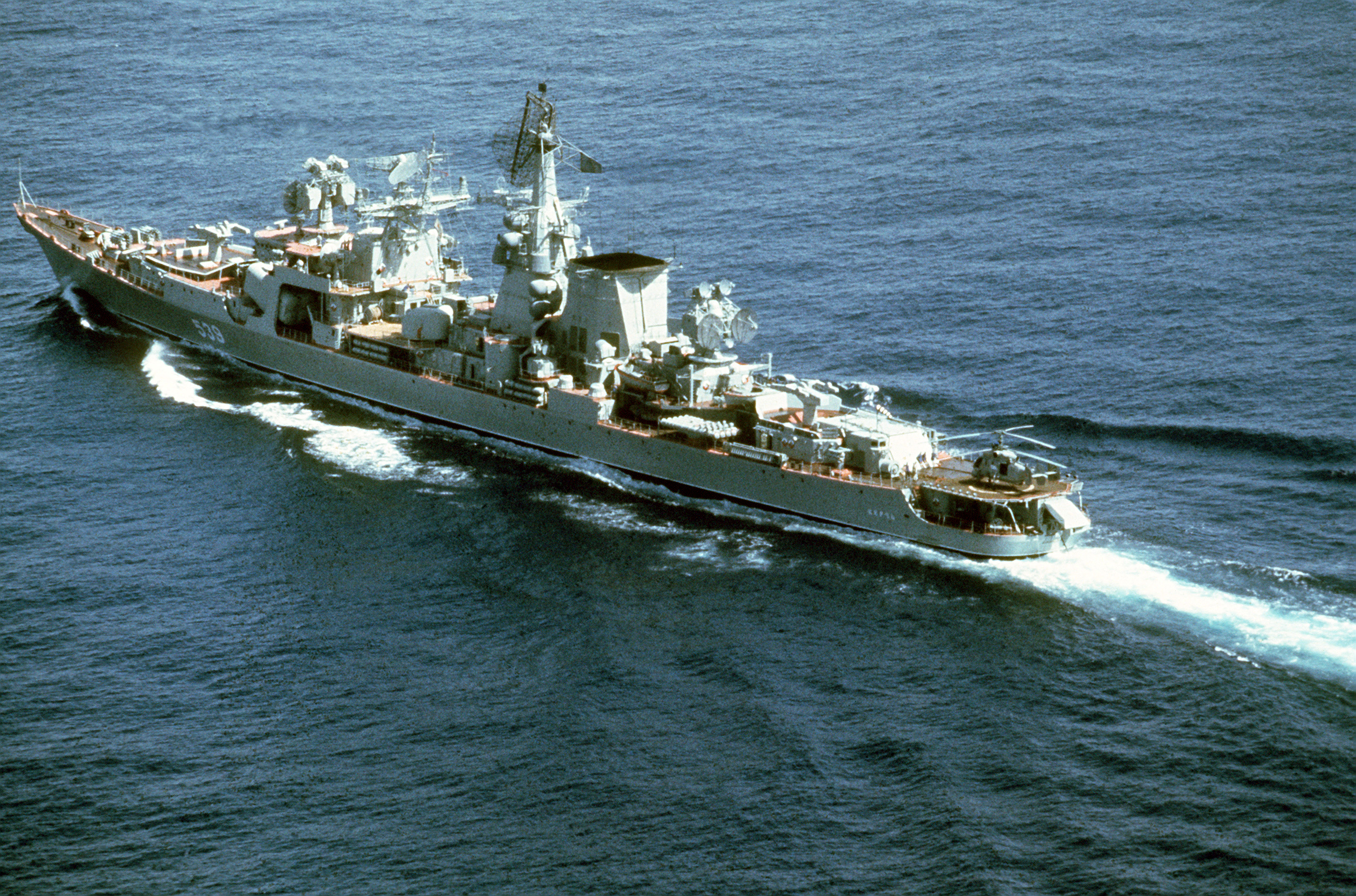
A stern shot of Kerch displays the raised pad and recessed hangar.

The rear deck of the cruiser was outfitted with a landing pad and hangar for a Ka-25PL naval helicopter. Previous Kresta-class cruisers had encountered problems with seawater flooding the landing pad, which was countered in the Karas by raising the landing pad higher above the waterline, and lowering the hangar into the ship. The Ka-25PL was primarily used to aid the ship in ASW activities, using dipping sonars and air-dropped sonobuoys to better detect targets at range. Ka-25PLs could carry 8 to 12 sonobuoys in the belly compartment, depending on type, or a single AT-1 torpedo.

== Ships ==
All ships were built by the 61 Communards Shipyard in Nikolayev.

Name	Russian	Laid down	Launched	Commissioned	Decommissioned	Notes
Nikolayev	Николаев	25 June 1968	19 December 1969	31 December 1971	29 October 1992	Scrapped in India, 1994
Ochakov	Очаков	19 December 1969	30 April 1971	4 November 1973	12 August 2011	Purposely sunk in channel of Donuzlav Bay 6 March 2014. Later refloated and awaits scrapping.
Kerch	Керчь	30 April 1971	21 July 1972	25 December 1974	15 February 2020	Scrapped at Inkerman, Sevastopol in 2020
Azov	Азов	21 July 1972	14 September 1973	25 December 1975	30 May 1998	Scrapped at Inkerman in 1999-2000.
Petropavlovsk	Петропавловск	9 September 1973	22 November 1974	29 December 1976	26 February 1992	Sold for scrap in 1996.
Tashkent	Ташкент	22 November 1974	5 November 1975	31 December 1977	3 July 1992	Sold for scrap in 1994.
Vladivostok (ex-Tallinn)	Владивосток (Таллин)	5 November 1975	5 November 1976	31 December 1979	5 July 1994	Sold for scrap in 1994.

== See also ==
- List of ships of the Soviet Navy
- List of ships of Russia by project number
