= Russian cruiser Azov =

1973 Kara-class missile cruiser

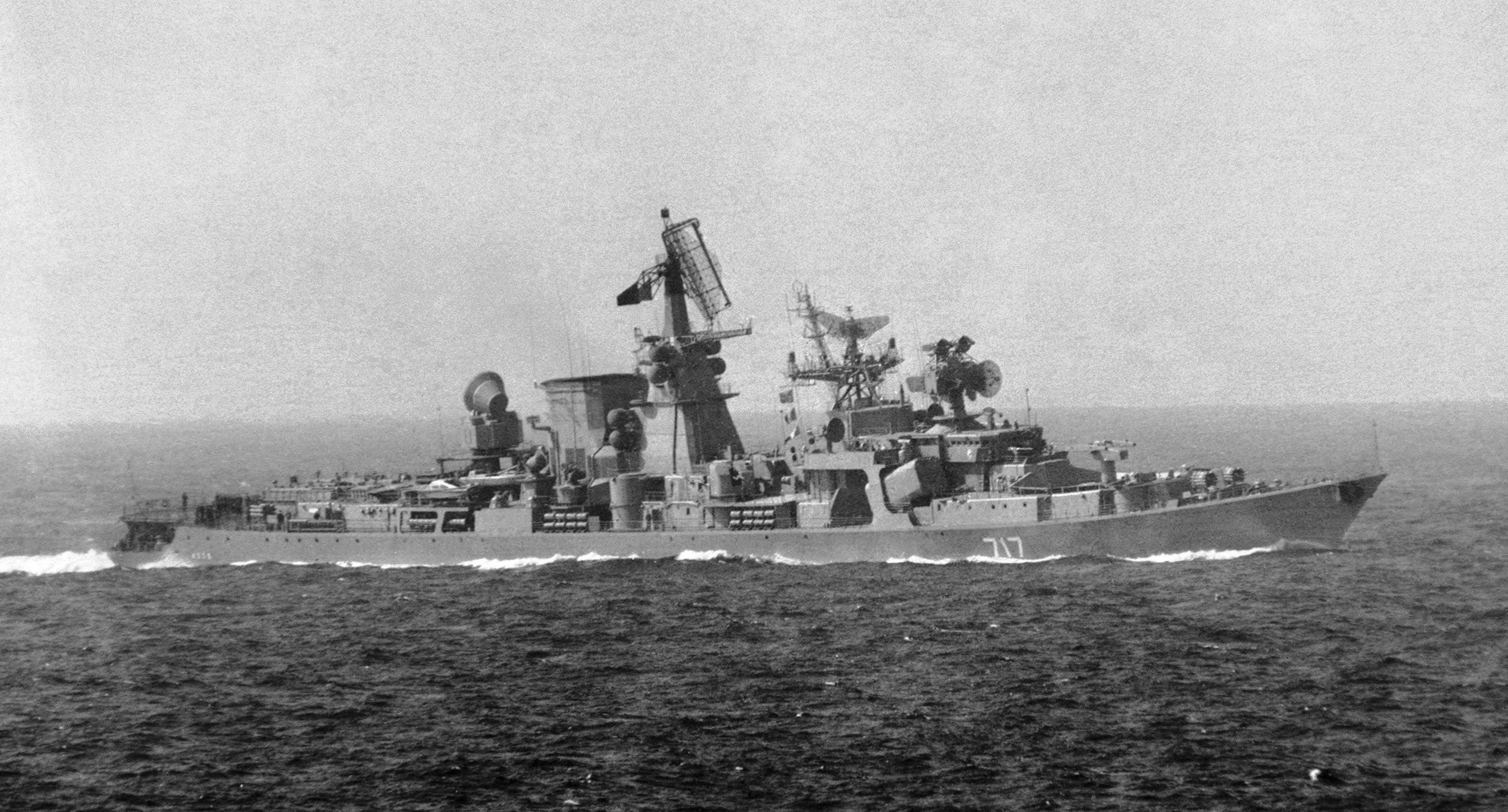

History

→ Soviet Union → Russia
- Name: Azov
- Builder: 61 Communards Shipyard
- Laid down: 21 July 1972
- Launched: 14 September 1973
- Commissioned: 25 December 1975
- Decommissioned: 1998
- Fate: Scrapped in 2000

General characteristics
- Class & type: Kara-class cruiser
- Displacement: 8,900 tons
- Length: 173.4 m (568.9 ft)
- Beam: 18.5 m (60.7 ft)
- Draft: 5.4 m (17.7 ft)
- Propulsion: 4 turbine-type generators GTG-12,5A x1250 kW; 1 turbine-type generator GTG-6M 600 kW
- Speed: 32 knots
- Range: 9,000 miles
- Complement: 425
- Armament: 2 quad SS-N-14 Silex anti-submarine missiles; 1 twin SA-N-3 Goblet surface-to-air missile launcher (42 missiles); SA-N-4 Gecko surface-to-air missile launchers (44 missiles); SA-N-6 surface-to-air missile (48 missiles); 2 twin 76mm AK-726 dual purpose guns; 4 30mm AK-630 CIWS; 2 × 5 533 mm PTA-53-1134B torpedo tubes; 2 RBU-6000 anti-submarine rocket launchers; 2 RBU-1000 anti-submarine rocket launchers
- Aircraft carried: 1 Kamov Ka-25

Azov was a Kara-class missile cruiser of the Soviet and later Russian Navy.

== History ==
Azov was laid down on 21 July 1972, launched on 14 September 1973 and was commissioned on 25 December 1975. The ship was stationed in the Black Sea Fleet. In 1977 the ship was modified to carry the new S-300F (SA-N-6) anti-air missile complex.

After the collapse of the Soviet Union the ship became a part of the Russian Navy. There the cruiser served until 1998, when the ship was decommissioned and scrapped in 2000.
