= Nanchang Q-5 =

Chinese jet ground-attack aircraft

Nanchang Q-5 / A-5
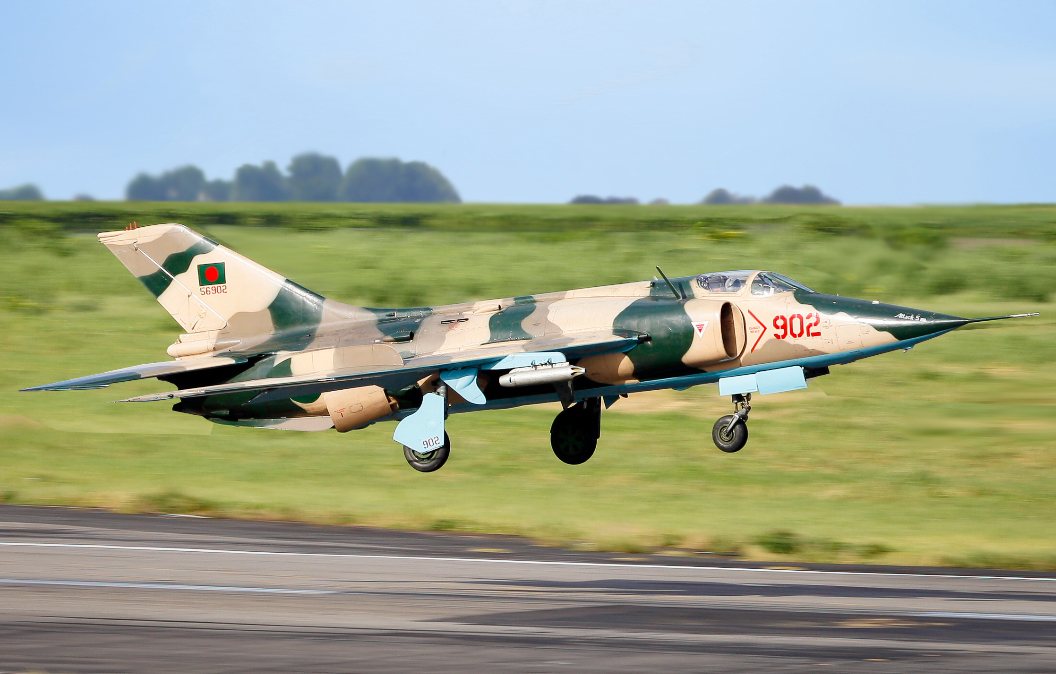
- An A-5 of the Bangladesh Air Force

General information
- Type: Ground-attack aircraft
- National origin: China
- Manufacturer: Nanchang Aircraft Mfg. Co.
- Status: In service with the Myanmar Air Force
- Primary users: People's Liberation Army Air Force (historical): People's Liberation Army Navy Air Force (historical); Pakistan Air Force (historical); Myanmar Air Force
- Number built: 1,300 (approx.)

History
- Manufactured: 1969–2012
- Introduction date: 1970
- First flight: 4 July 1965
- Retired: 2017 by PLA Air Force; 2011 by Pakistan Air Force; 2015 by Bangladesh Air Force
- Developed from: Shenyang J-6

The Nanchang Q-5 (Chinese: 强-5; pinyin: Qiang-5; NATO reporting name: Fantan), also known as the A-5 in its export versions, is a 1960s-design Chinese-built single-seat, twin jet engine ground-attack aircraft based on the Shenyang J-6. The aircraft is primarily used for close air support.

== Design and development ==
The PRC was an enthusiastic user of the MiG-19, which it manufactured locally as the Shenyang J-6 from 1958. In August 1958, the People's Liberation Army requested development of a jet attack aircraft for the air support role.

Lu Xiaopeng was appointed chief designer of this project. Lu also designed the J-12 fighter jet. Although based on the MiG-19, the new design, designated Qiangjiji-5 (fifth attack aircraft design), had a longer fuselage, area ruled to reduce transonic drag and accommodate a 4 m (13-ft) long internal weapons bay. The air intakes were moved to the fuselage sides to make space in the nose for a planned target radar (which was never actually fitted). New wings with greater area and reduced sweep were incorporated. The Q-5 shares the J-6's Liming Wopen WP-6 A (Tumansky RD-9) turbojet engines. The redesign cost some high-altitude speed, but the Q-5 is as fast as the MiG-19/J-6 at low level, thanks largely to the area-ruled fuselage.

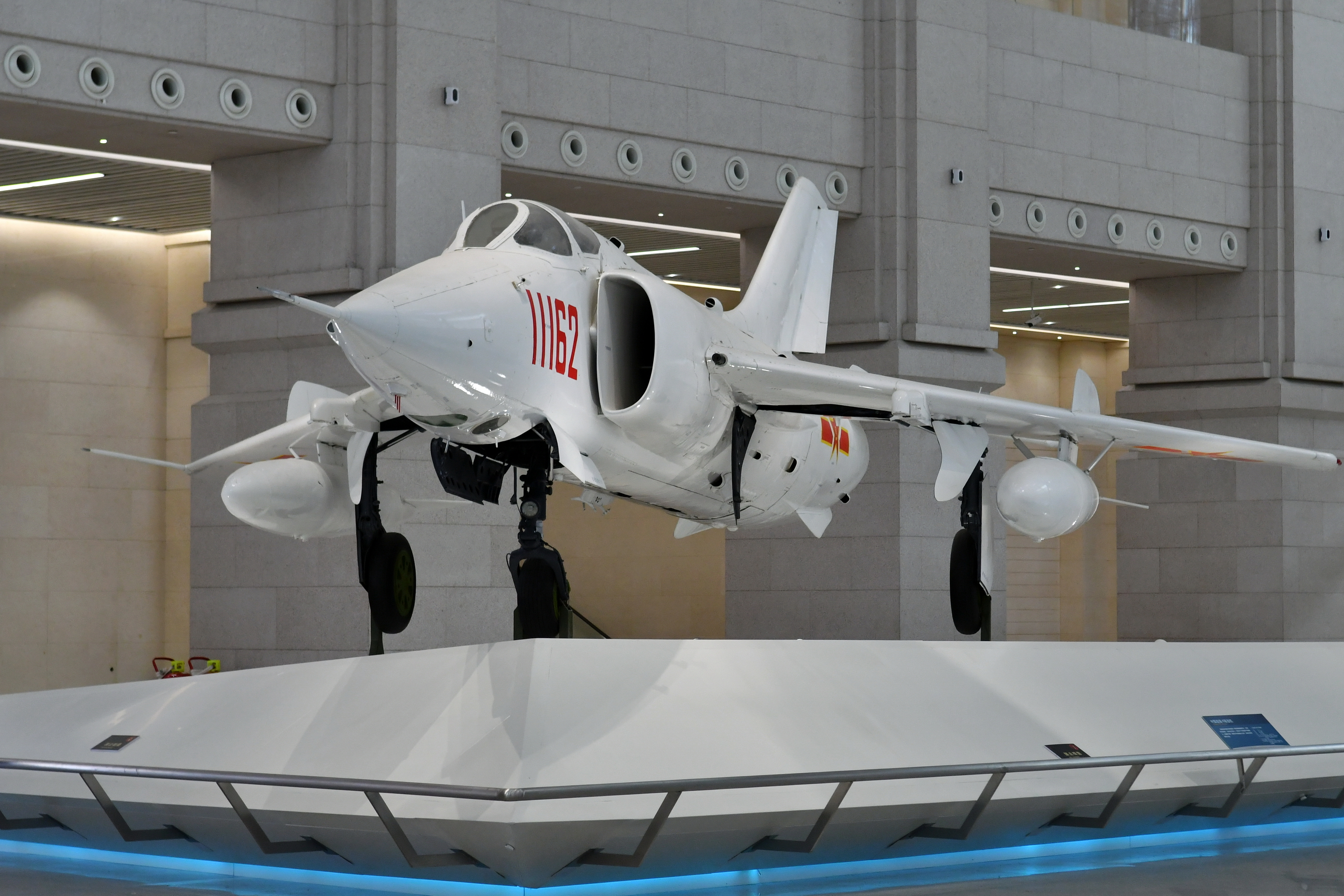
Q-5 in Military Museum of the Chinese People's Revolution.

Fixed armament of the Q-5 was reduced to two Type 23-1 23 mm cannon with 100 rounds per gun, mounted in the wing roots. Two pylons under each wing and two pairs of tandem pylons under the engines were provided in addition to the weapons bay. A total of 1,000 kg (2,205 lb) of ordnance could be carried internally, with an additional 1,000 kg externally. On many aircraft the weapons bay is now used primarily for an auxiliary fuel tank.

Production drawings were completed in 1960 allowing construction of prototypes to begin, but the political climate in China resulted in the project being canceled in 1961. A small team kept the program alive until work restarted in earnest at Nanchang. The first flight finally occurred on 4 July 1965. Series production began in 1969, with squadron delivery starting in 1970.

About 1,300 aircraft were produced, 600 of them being the updated Q-5A.

Some were retrofitted to be capable of carrying a small nuclear bomb, with the People's Liberation Army Air Force wanting a more maneuverable aircraft which could block or delay a potential Soviet invasion. In March 1979, the Central Committee stopped this program, which was one of China's few tactical nuclear weapons programs.

A long-range Q-5I, introduced in 1983, added a fuel tank instead of the internal weapons bay, compensating for that with the provision of two additional underwing pylons. Some of these aircraft serve with the PLA Navy, and have apparently been equipped with radar to guide anti-ship missiles. Subsequent minor upgrades include the Q-5IA, with a new gun/bomb sighting system and avionics, and the Q-5II, with radar warning receiver (RWR).

The aircraft was exported to allied nations such as Pakistan, Bangladesh, Myanmar, and Sudan as late as 2003 under the designation A-5. The A-5 was also reportedly exported to North Korea, while other sources mention no service with the Korean People's Army Air Force.

Plans for an upgraded Q-5/A-5 with Western equipment and new navigation and attack (nav/attack) systems were largely aborted following the 1989 Tiananmen Square protests and massacre, but the aircraft continued in service until its retirement in 2017. It is a capable light attack aircraft, although its limited navigation and weapons-delivery systems are inferior to more modern aircraft.

In more recent years, the PLAAF has begun to field newer models of the Q-5, that incorporate some of the technology developed during the canceled Q-5M and Q-5K projects. The Q-5 introduces a nose-mounted laser rangefinder, and a laser designator is also likely to be fitted since the aircraft is said to be able to deliver laser-guided bombs. The Q-5A variant is believed to be capable of delivering nuclear munitions. The Q-5D is an upgrade with new avionics, including a HUD and a new navigation system. The Q-5E and Q-5F models are reportedly being worked on, though little is known about them at this time.

== Operational history ==
The Sudanese Air Force employed its A-5 attack jets during the War in Darfur.

In March 2015, some Myanmar Air Force A-5C jets flying sorties against the Myanmar National Democratic Alliance Army, accidentally dropped bombs on a Chinese village in Gengma County, Yunnan inside the Chinese border, killing 4 villagers, with the PLA responding by deploying HQ-12 surface-to-air missiles and fighter jets.

On 20 April 2017 two Q-5s were seen in Bohai Bay practicing air strikes against ground targets in the wake of increased tensions on the Korean peninsula.

The Q-5 was replaced by the Xi'an JH-7 during the 2010s.

== Variants ==
=== Domestic variants ===
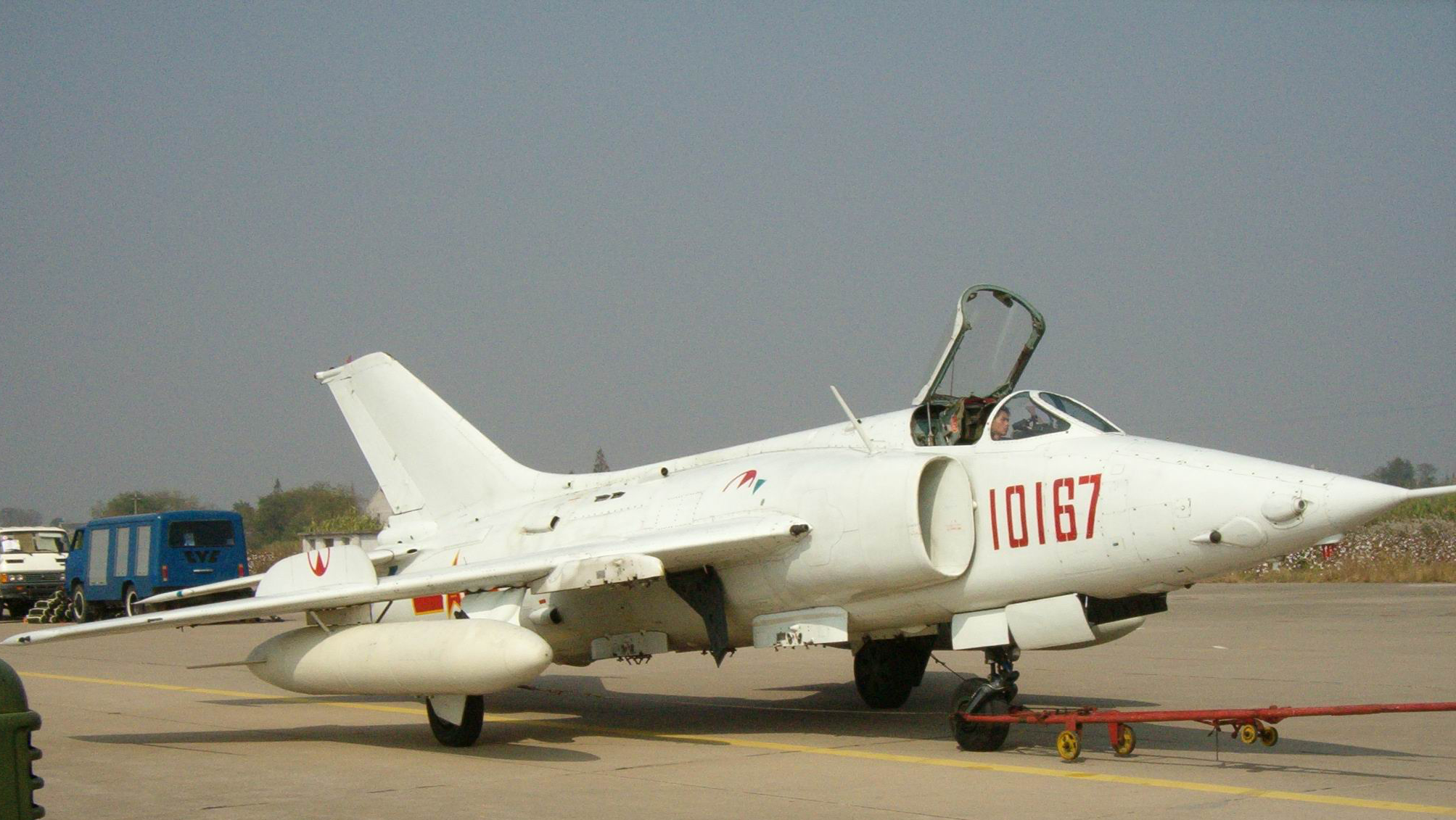
Q-5

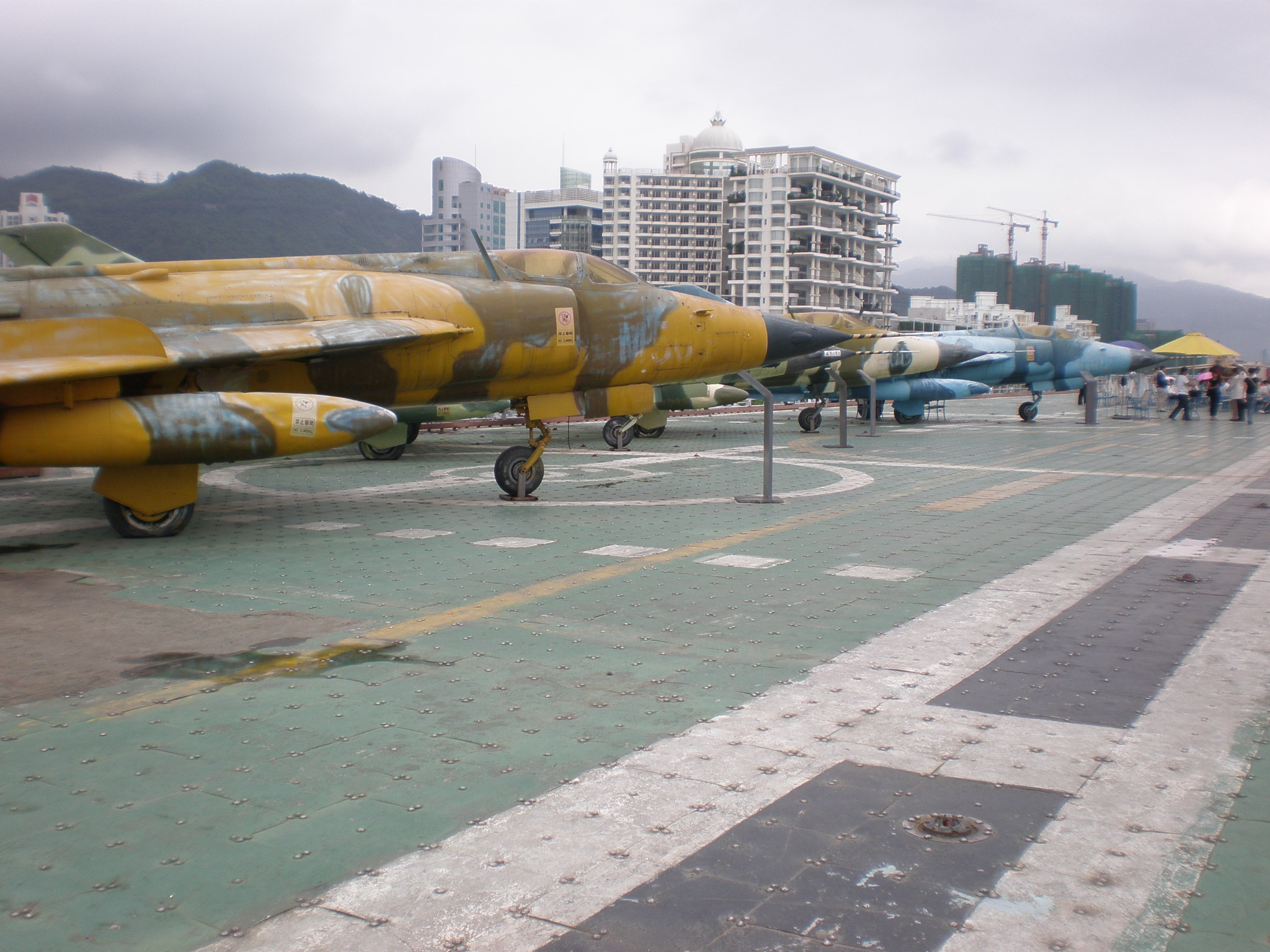
Old Q-5s on the deck of the Minsk, at the Minsk World Theme Park

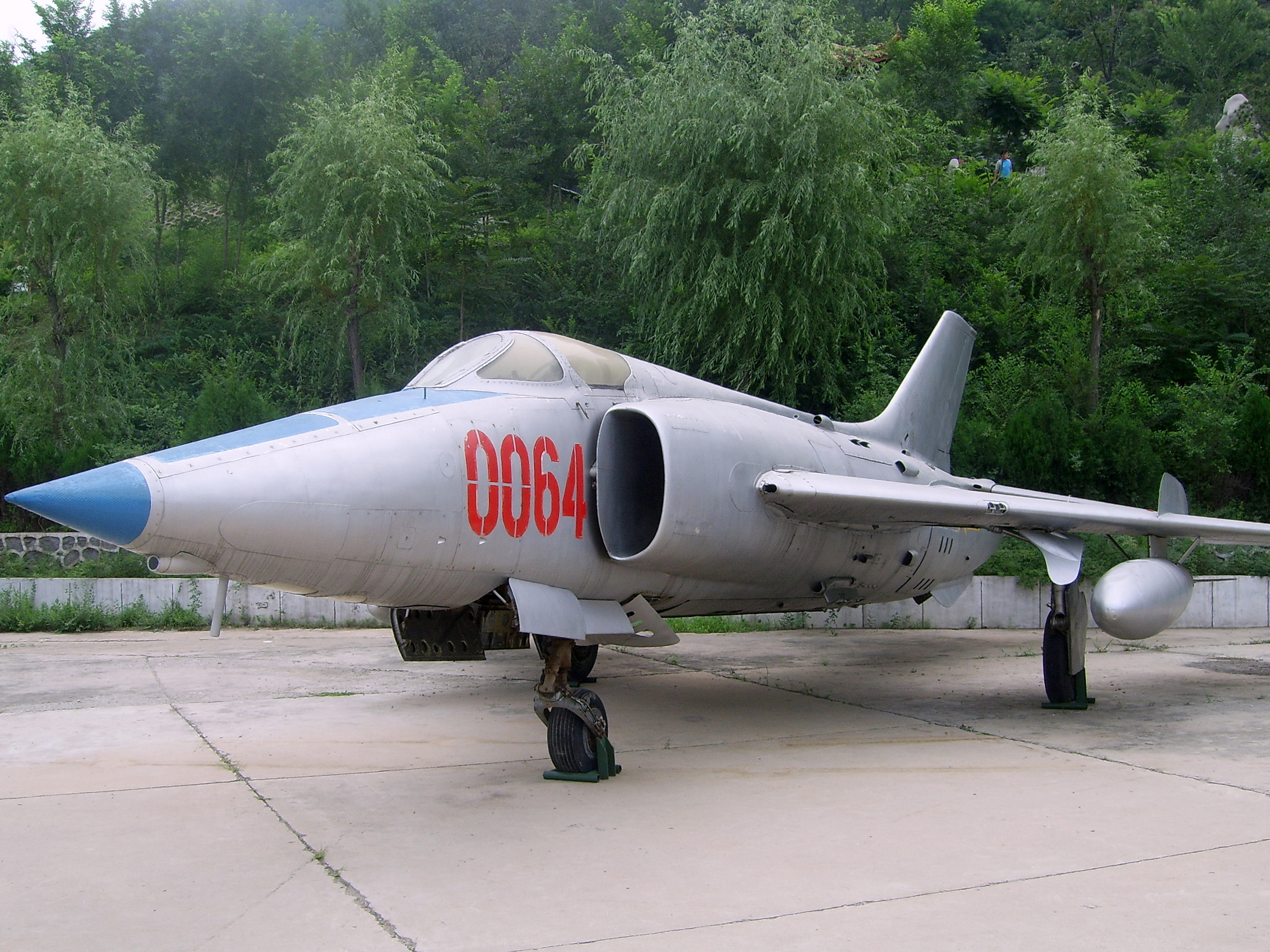
Old Q-5 numbered #0064

- Q-5: Original production version with a total of 6 pylons, two under each wing and two under the fuselage, and was superseded by the Q-5A.
- Q-5Jia: Q-5 modified to carry Kuangbiao-1 tactical nuclear bombs, only a very limited number were built. 317Jia radar was tested as improvement program. One of such aircraft is currently on display at the aviation museum in Beijing.
- Q-5Yi: Torpedo attacker for navy, only few manufactured. YJ-8 anti-ship missile was also being considered, but the program was cancelled due to budget problem even though the missile was well developed, and afterwards missile test launches were conducted from Type 024 missile boat. In eighties, YJ-81 was once mounted for test, but this proposition was soon rejected when it was decided to let JH-7 take the role.
- Q-5I (Q-5A): Q-5 with the internal weapon bay replaced by internal fuel tank, increasing fuel capacity over 70%. Like all previous Q-5 variants, navigation was still a bottle neck with the result being that aircraft must fly longer times in more complex search patterns in long range strikes. However, this problem is somewhat reduced by the increased fuel capacity. An indigenous Type 79Y4 laser rangefinder developed by No. 613 Institute was fitted.
- Q-5IA (Q-5B): Improved Q-5I, radar warning receiver and flare dispensers added, the original weapon aiming sight of the Q-5 was developed by No. 5311 Factory, and named as SH-1, short for She – Hong (Shoot-Bomb-1 / 射轰-1), which only had limited capability because attacks could only be carried out at a fixed angle. No. 5311 Factory developed an improved version SH-1I (射轰-1甲) to allow the attack to be carried out at different angles. Extra outer pylon under each wing added for PL-2/PL-5 air-to-air missiles, bombs or rocket launchers.
- Q-5II (Q-5C): Q-5I with omnidirectional radar warning receivers. Later, Type 205 pulse doppler navigation radar was installed on several planes to solve the navigation problem.
- Q-5III: Foreign trade variant, export name A-5III/A-5C, Project Long6 (Dragon Six). Total 10 pylons, with 1 extra pylon under each wing for R.550/AIM-9 air-to-air missiles. See also Export variants.
- Q-5 with indigenous nav/attack system: Project CC, Q-5I with indigenous Type 205 doppler navigation system, Q5HK-15 laser rangefinder and SH-1IIA sight. One year later, head-up display and air data computer were incorporated into system. The whole system finally got approved in 1992, and relevant technology was applied to Q-5D several years later.
- Q-5IV (Q-5M, Q-5D(old)): Project CI. Joint Chinese-Italian project to upgrade the Q-5II with Italian avionics from the AMX International AMX attack fighter. Avionics would include a ranging radar, head-up display, inertial navigation system, air data computer and dual central computers all integrated via dual-redundant MIL-STD-1553B databus. Completion and first deliveries were to take place in late 1988 and early 1989 respectively. 28.8% change in comparison to the closest earlier version. Two central computers like that of Q-5M and new RW-30 radar warning receivers were added. ALR-1 laser rangefinder and QHK-10 Head-Up Display developed by No. 613 Institute were added. Although the project was influenced after the 1989 Tiananmen Square protests and massacre, it was approved to continue by China and Italy in 1992, new upgrade items such as IFIR and ELINT, etc., were put into program. Due to the loss of time, it failed to enter production. See also Export variants.
- Q-5D(C): Composite material demonstrator for Q-5D(old).
- Q-5IIGai (Q-5K, Q-5E(old)): Project CF, joint Chinese-French project to upgrade Q-5II with French avionics, such as VE110 head-Up Display, ULIS91 inertial navigation system, TMV630 laser rangefinder and other electro-optics. Like the Q-5M/A-5M, the project was cancelled after the Tiananmen Square protest of 1989. So some indigenous equipment such as doppler radar, jammer etc., were used to achieve further progress. It was terminated in 1993.
- Q-5D: Interim attack aircraft introduced during the 1996 Taiwan Strait Crisis, the separate doppler navigation system and GPS of the Q-5C was replaced by the DG-1 integrated doppler navigation/GPS system. Other systems included the ALR-1 Laser rangefinder/Marked Target seeker and QHK-10 Head-Up Display. A new weapon aiming sight, the SH-1II (射轰-1乙), replaced the older SH-1I (射轰-1甲), and No. 5311 Factory managed to successfully integrate this sight with the new laser rangefinder and Type 205 navigation radar.
- Q-5E: New pylon with ability to mount laser-guided bombs such as LS-500J LGB, fire control system also improved. Laser pod is absent from the plane due to weight issue.
- Q-5F: Laser designator pod carrier, special large belly right pylon mounted for laser targeting pod, which is always false recognized as semi-buried electro-optical targeting pod.
- Q-5G: Q-5E with belly conformal fuel tank to solve the range problem.
- JQ-5J: Tandem two seater of Q-5. The manufacturer claimed that it can be used as forward air control like the OA-10A, and providing targeting information via data links. The rear seat is 286 millimetres higher than the front seat, enables the back-seat pilot to have a 5 degree field of vision, and the canopy opens to the right. When used as a trainer, the rear cockpit control can override that of the front cockpit.
- Q-5L – Upgraded Q-5C, with LLLTV/FLIR vision systems for a day/night capability. Infrared imaging and television cameras were mounted on nose orb. Other improvements include Head Up Display, GPS Rx, INS, TACAN, and chaff/flare dispensers. Weapons capability include the Chinese LS-500J laser-guided glide bombs with a 12 km range. Optional belly conformal fuel tank.
- Q-5N – Upgraded Q-5D with same upgrade program as Q-5L, main difference is navigation system of Q-5D.

=== Export variants ===
- A-5: Export designation for version of the Q-5 to North Korea in 1970s that appeared in Chinese media. The designation contains more than one variant since the Chinese military aid to North Korea is protracted, but it's not clear whether this export version is derived from Q-5, Q-5A, Q-5I or Q-5IA.
- A-5IIA: Modified version of Q-5II, sold to Sudan.
- A-5IIIK: Export version of Q-5III sold to Myanmar.
- A-5III/A-5C: Export version with Western equipment upon customers' requests, such as flight instrumentation made by Rockwell Collins, and Western ejection seat made by Martin-Baker. Added the capability to fire Western weaponry such as the French SNEB, Matra Durandal, R.550 Magic or US AIM-9 Sidewinders. Exported to Pakistan.
- A-5IV/A-5M: Export version of Q-5M with more Western equipment such as flight instrumentation made by Rockwell Collins, and Western ejection seat made by Martin-Baker. Added the capability to fire Western missiles such as the R.550 Magic or AIM-9 Sidewinder. Myanmar ordered, but chose A-5IIIK instead after program extension. Evaluated by the Pakistan Air Force in 1990.

== Surviving aircraft ==
- Q-5I - Jianchuan Museum Cluster
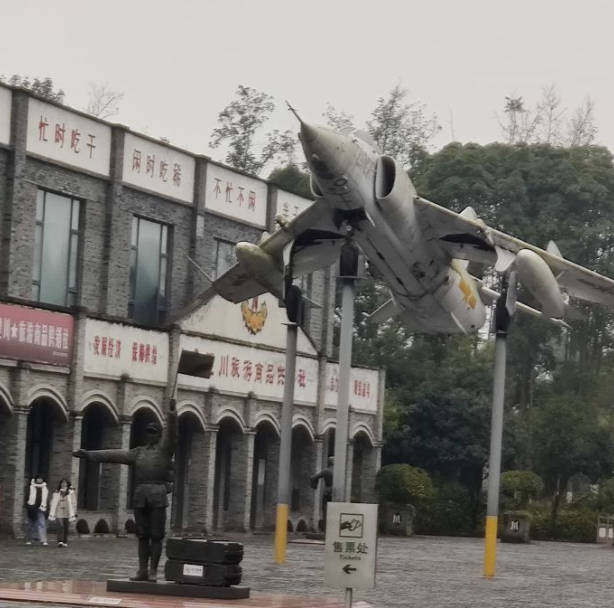
  Q-5I at Jianchuan Museum Cluster
- Minsk world theme park (Soviet aircraft carrier Minsk)

== Operators ==
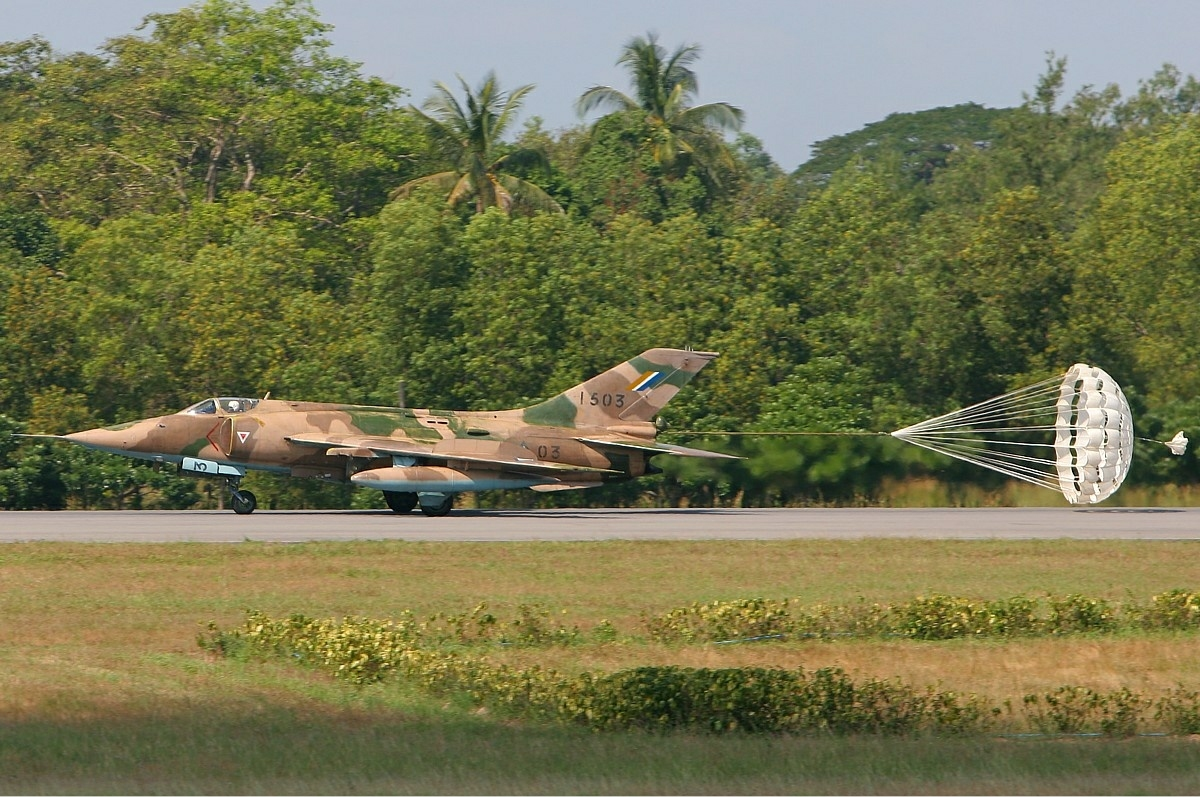
Myanmar Air Force A-5C with drogue parachute deployed.

=== Current ===
Myanmar

- Myanmar Air Force − Received 24 A-5C in 1997−1998. 20 remain in service as of December 2025

Sudan

- Sudanese Air Force − 20 A-5C in service as of 2026.

=== Former ===
Bangladesh

- Bangladesh Air Force − Operated 21 A-5C in 2003, this number declined to 18 before it was retired c. 2015

China

- People's Liberation Army Air Force − Operated 500 in 2003,. Kept in service until 2017, it was estimated that 120 Q-5C/D/E were in service prior to their retirement
- People's Liberation Army Navy − Operated 30 Q-5 prior to their retirement c. 2011

Pakistan

- Pakistan Air Force − 58 delivered in total between 1983−2003
  - No. 7 Squadron Bandits operated A-5C from 1983 until c. 1991
  - No. 26 Squadron Black Spiders operated A-5C from 1984 until February 2010
  - No. 16 Squadron Black Panthers operated A-5C from 1983 until April 2011

== Specifications (Q-5D) ==
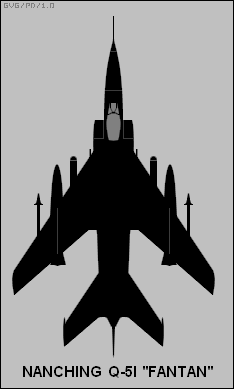
View of Nanchang Q-5

Data from Wilson

General characteristics

- Crew: 1
- Length: 15.65 m (51 ft 4 in)
- Wingspan: 9.68 m (31 ft 9 in)
- Height: 4.33 m (14 ft 2 in)
- Wing area: 27.95 m^{2} (300.9 sq ft)
- Empty weight: 6,375 kg (14,054 lb)
- Gross weight: 9,486 kg (20,913 lb)
- Max takeoff weight: 11,830 kg (26,081 lb)
- Powerplant: 2 × Liming Wopen-6A afterburning turbojet engines, 29.42 kN (6,610 lbf) thrust each dry, 36.78 kN (8,270 lbf) with afterburner

Performance

- Maximum speed: 1,190 km/h (740 mph, 640 kn)
- Maximum speed: Mach 1.12 at altitude
- Range: 2,000 km (1,200 mi, 1,100 nmi)
- Combat range: 400 km (250 mi, 220 nmi) lo-lo-lo with maximum payload

600 km (370 mi; 320 nmi) hi-lo-hi

- Service ceiling: 16,500 m (54,100 ft)
- Rate of climb: 103 m/s (20,300 ft/min)
- Wing loading: 423.3 kg/m^{2} (86.7 lb/sq ft)
- Thrust/weight: 0.588

Armament

- Guns: 2× Norinco Type 23-2K 23 mm (0.906 in) cannon, 100 rounds per gun
- Hardpoints: 10 (4× under-fuselage, 6× under-wing) with a capacity of 2,000 kg (4,400 lb), with provisions to carry combinations of:
  - Rockets: 57 mm, 90 mm, 130 mm unguided rocket pods
  - Missiles: PL-2, PL-5, PL-7 air-to-air missiles
  - Bombs:

- 50 kg (110 lb), 150 kg (330 lb), 250 kg (550 lb), 500 kg (1,100 lb) unguided bombs
- BL755 cluster bombs
- Matra Durandal anti-runway bombs

- Others:
  - Fuel tanks: 400 L (105 U.S. gal), 760 L (200 U.S. gal), 1,100 L (300 U.S. gal)

== See also ==
Related development

- Mikoyan-Gurevich MiG-19
- Shenyang J-6
- Xi'an JH-7

Aircraft of comparable role, configuration, and era

- Soko J-22 Orao – (Yugoslavia, Romania)
- Sukhoi Su-7 – (Soviet Union)
- SEPECAT Jaguar – (France, United Kingdom)
- F-105 Thunderchief – (United States)
- A-4 Skyhawk – (United States)
- F-11 Tiger – (United States)
- A-10 – (United States)
- Su-25 – (Soviet Union, Russia, Georgia)

Related lists

- List of historic aircraft of the People's Liberation Army Air Force
