= Minsk World =

Defunct military theme park in China

Minsk World 明思克航母世界
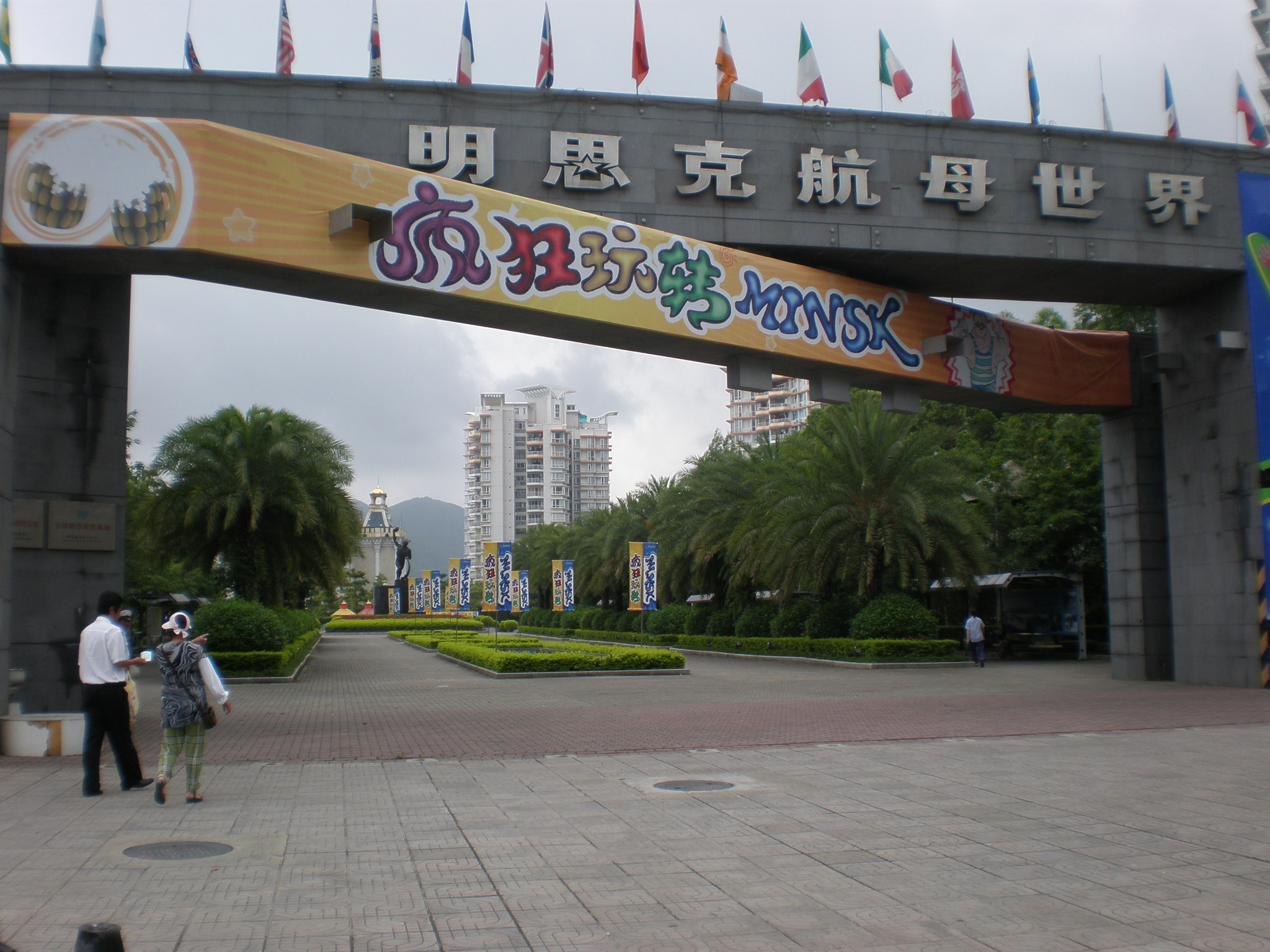
- The main entrance to Minsk World
- Interactive map of Minsk World 明思克航母世界
- Location: Shenzhen, Guangdong, China
- Coordinates: 22.553772°N 114.237009°E
- Status: Defunct
- Opened: 10 May 2000; 26 years ago
- Closed: 14 February 2016; 10 years ago
- Theme: Military theme naval theme
- Attendance: 5 million

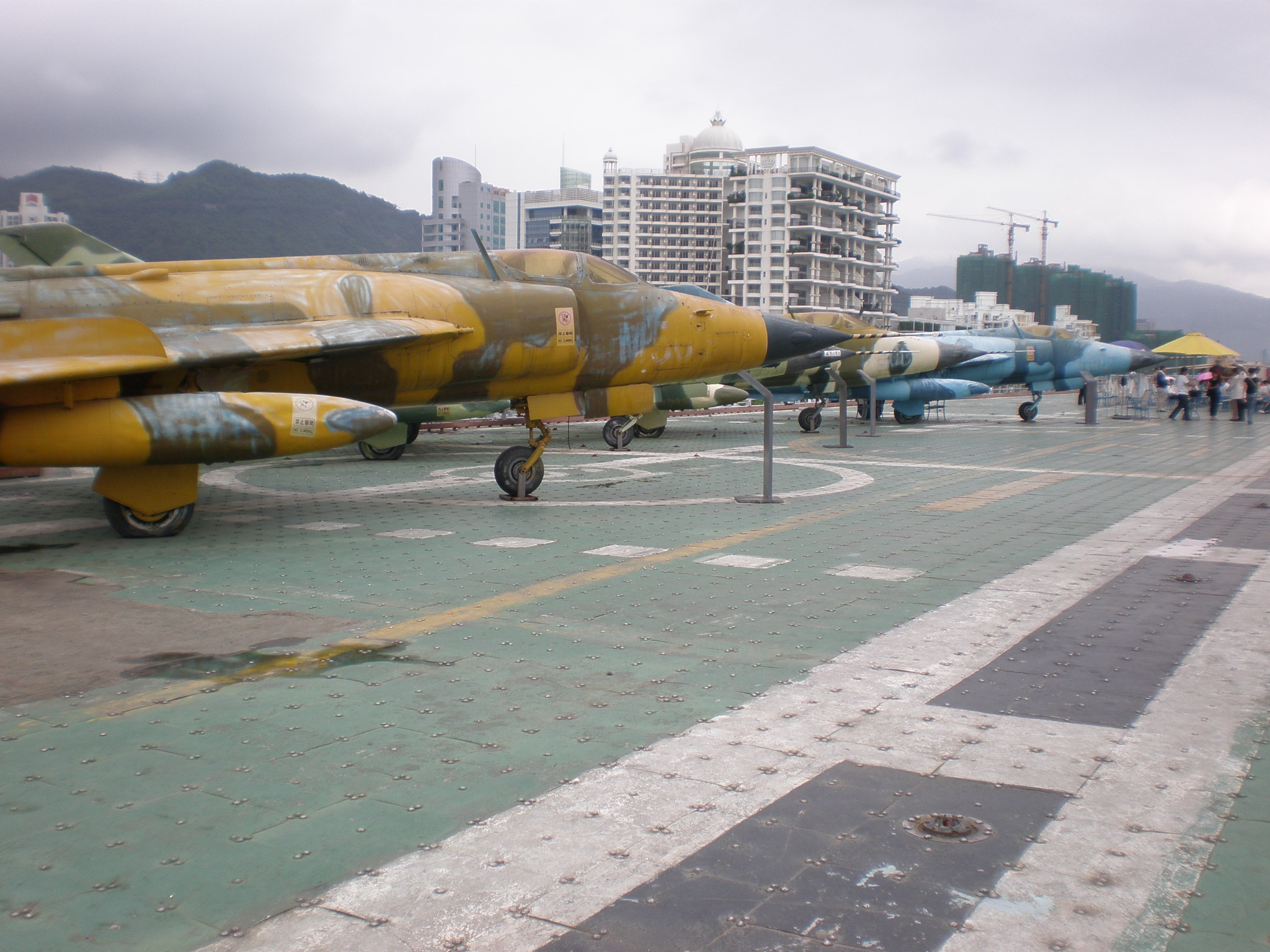
The flight deck of the Minsk

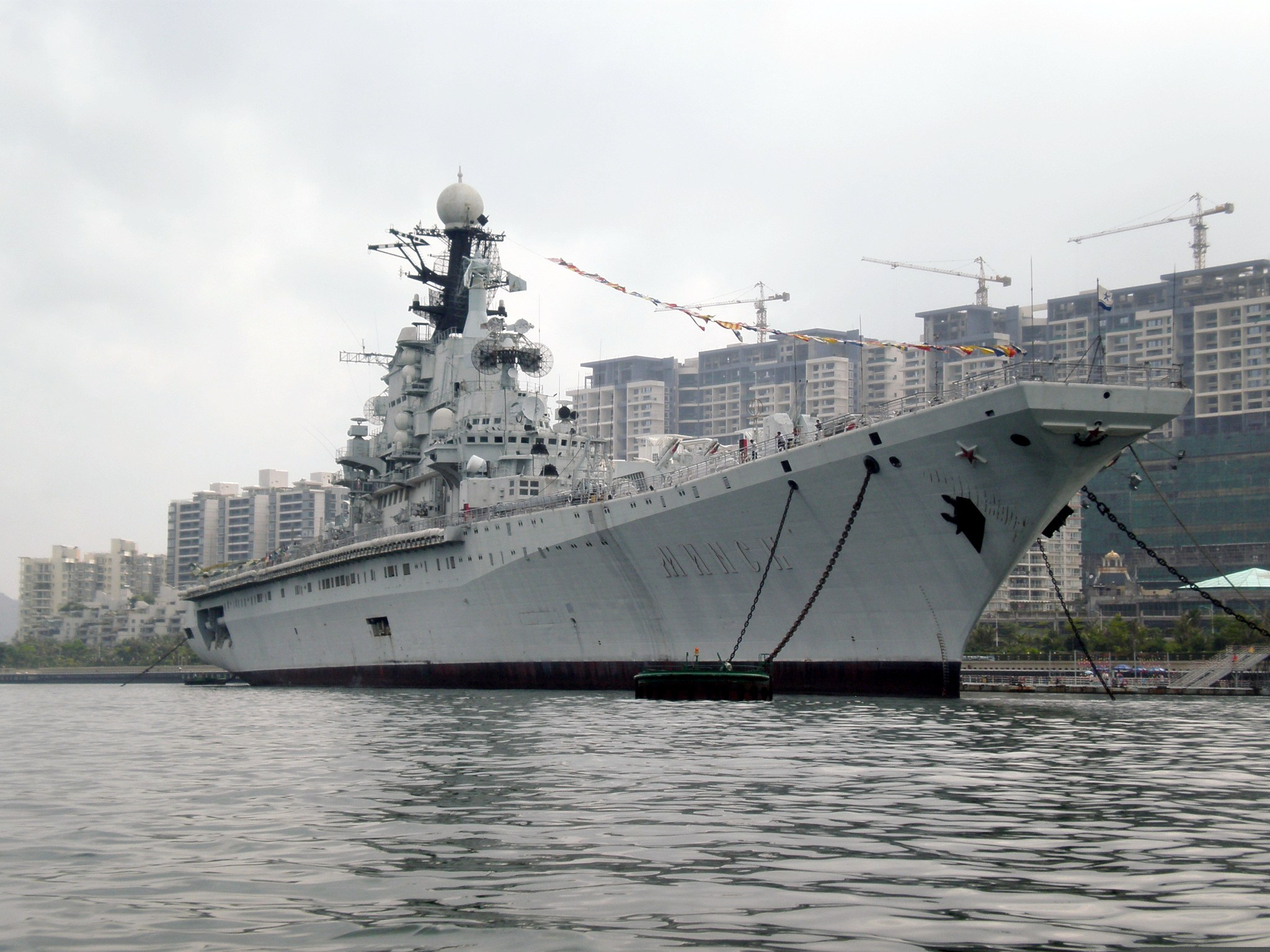
Minsk from the starboard side

Minsk World (Chinese: 明思克航母世界; pinyin: Míngsīkè Hángmǔ Shìjiè) was a military theme park located in Dapeng Bay, Shatoujiao, Shenzhen, Guangdong, China. It included the former Soviet (later Russian) aircraft carrier Minsk, redesigned as a tourist attraction. The theme park opened on 10 May 2000. As of 2005, it had attracted more than five million visitors and generated 450 million yuan in revenue. The park closed in February 2016 and the aircraft carrier was moved to Zhoushan for repairs, after which it would be moved to another theme park in Nantong, Jiangsu.

== History ==
The aircraft carrier Minsk was part of the Soviet Pacific Fleet. It had to be retired as a result of a major accident which could only be repaired at Chernomorski's facility, located in the newly independent Ukraine. In 1995, it was sold to a South Korean businessman, and later resold to Shenzhen Minsk Aircraft Carrier Industry Co. Ltd., a Chinese company. Until 2006, when the company went bankrupt, Minsk was the centrepiece of a military theme park in Shatoujiao (沙头角) district, Shenzhen, called Minsk World. The aircraft carrier was put up for auction on 22 March 2006. No bids at the starting price of 128 million RMB were received, so the carrier was withdrawn from sale.

On 31 May 2006, the ship was auctioned off in Shenzhen for 128 million RMB to CITIC Shenzhen, which operated the carrier as the CITIC Minsk World military theme park. The ship was painted with the hull number 015, matching the Chinese Navy's first aircraft carrier Liaoning (16).

After a decline in visitor numbers, the park closed in 2016 when the local government decided to reclaim land in the area. The aircraft carrier was moved to Zhoushan for repairs, after which it will be moved to another theme park in Nantong, Jiangsu.

On 16 August 2024, the ship caught fire during further refit work in Nantong. Although the fire could be extinguished, the future of the ship as a centerpiece of another theme park became uncertain.

== Facilities ==
In addition to the island, four of the carrier's decks, including the flight deck and hangar deck, were open to visitors. Various aspects of the Minsk, such as its living quarters and armament, were set up as exhibits. The staff were dressed in mock military uniforms, while regular choreographed musical performances were held on the flight and hangar decks. It was also possible to take a quick ride around the starboard side of the Minsk via motorboat.

In 2006, Chinese filmmaker Cheng Xiaoxing made a documentary about "Minsk World", broadcast on Arte TV.

=== Static display ===
There were a number of military aircraft and armaments on display on the deck and on the mainland area:

- MiG-23
- Mi-24
- Mikoyan MiG-27
- Yakovlev Yak-38
- M-11 Shtorm
- 53-65 torpedo
- AK-630

== Gallery ==
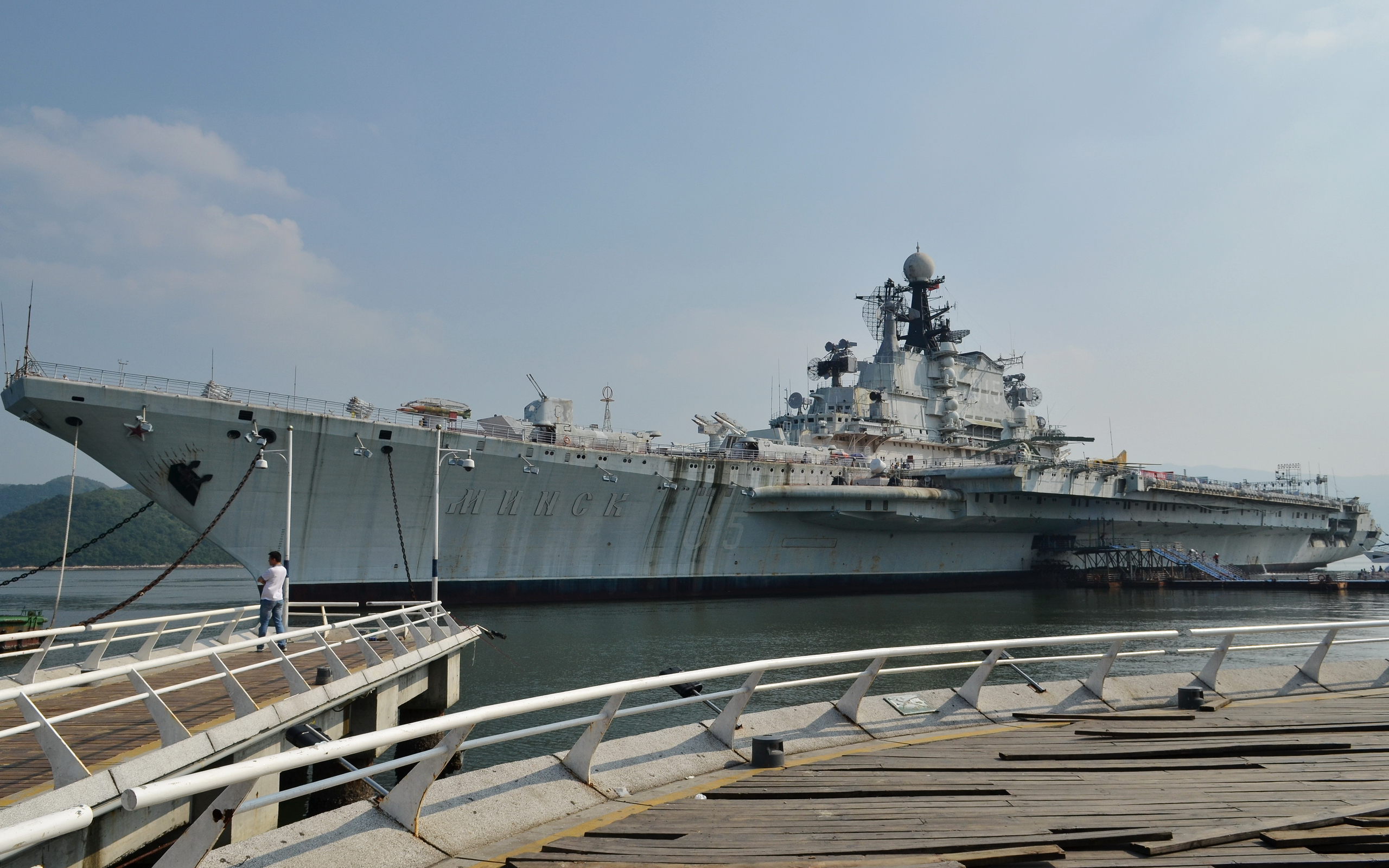
Minsk

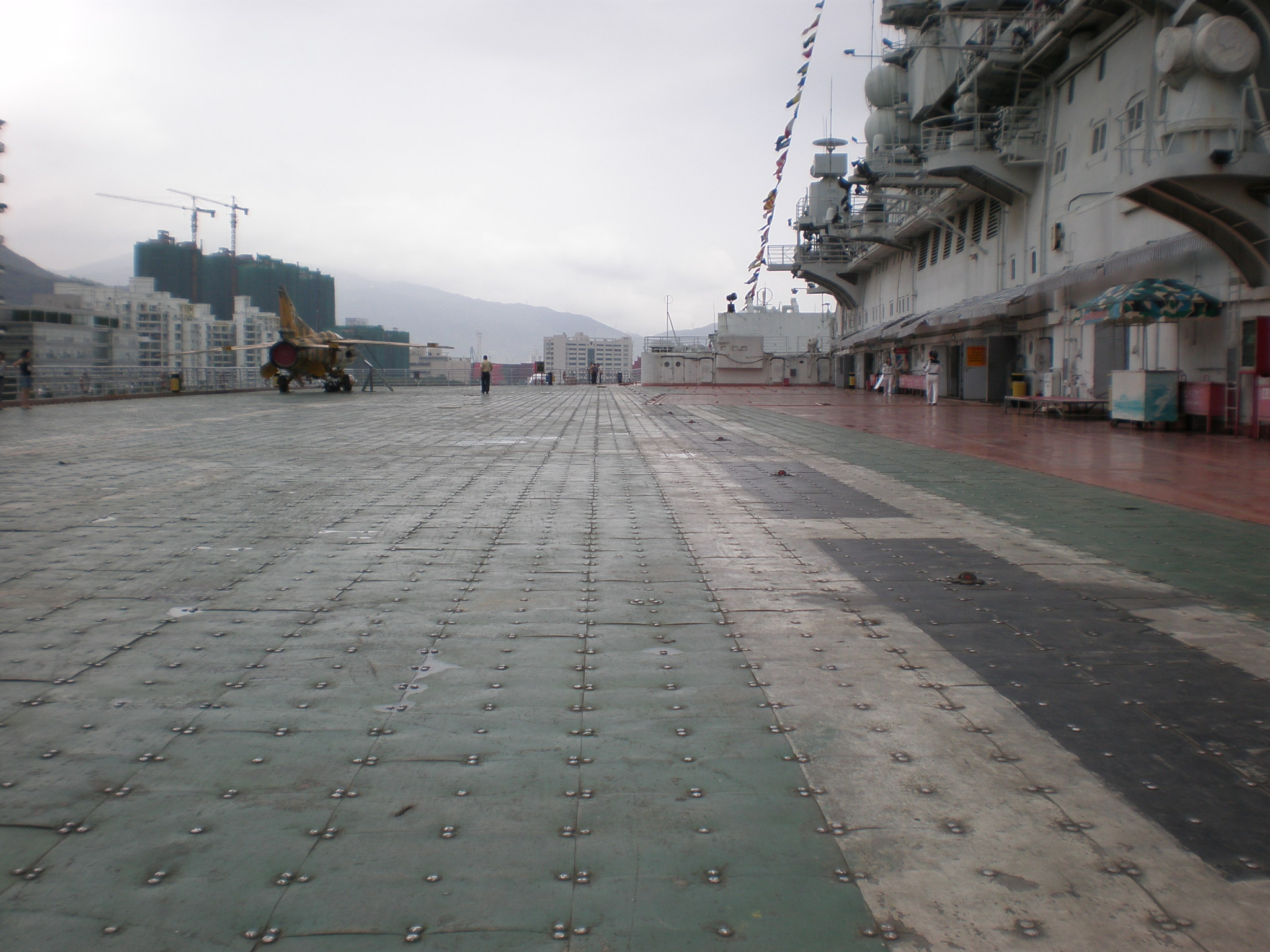
Minsk carrier flight deck

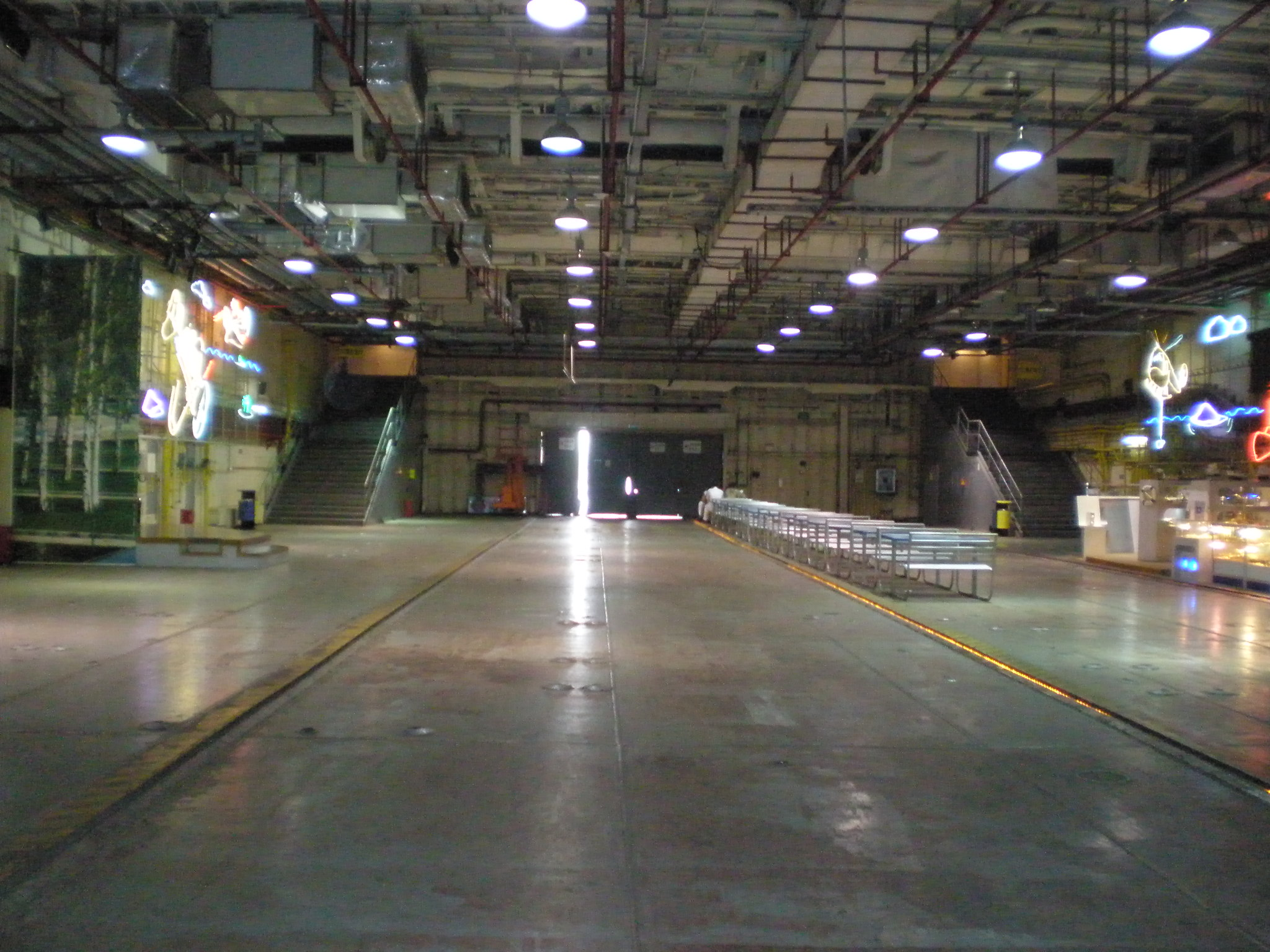
Minsk hangar deck

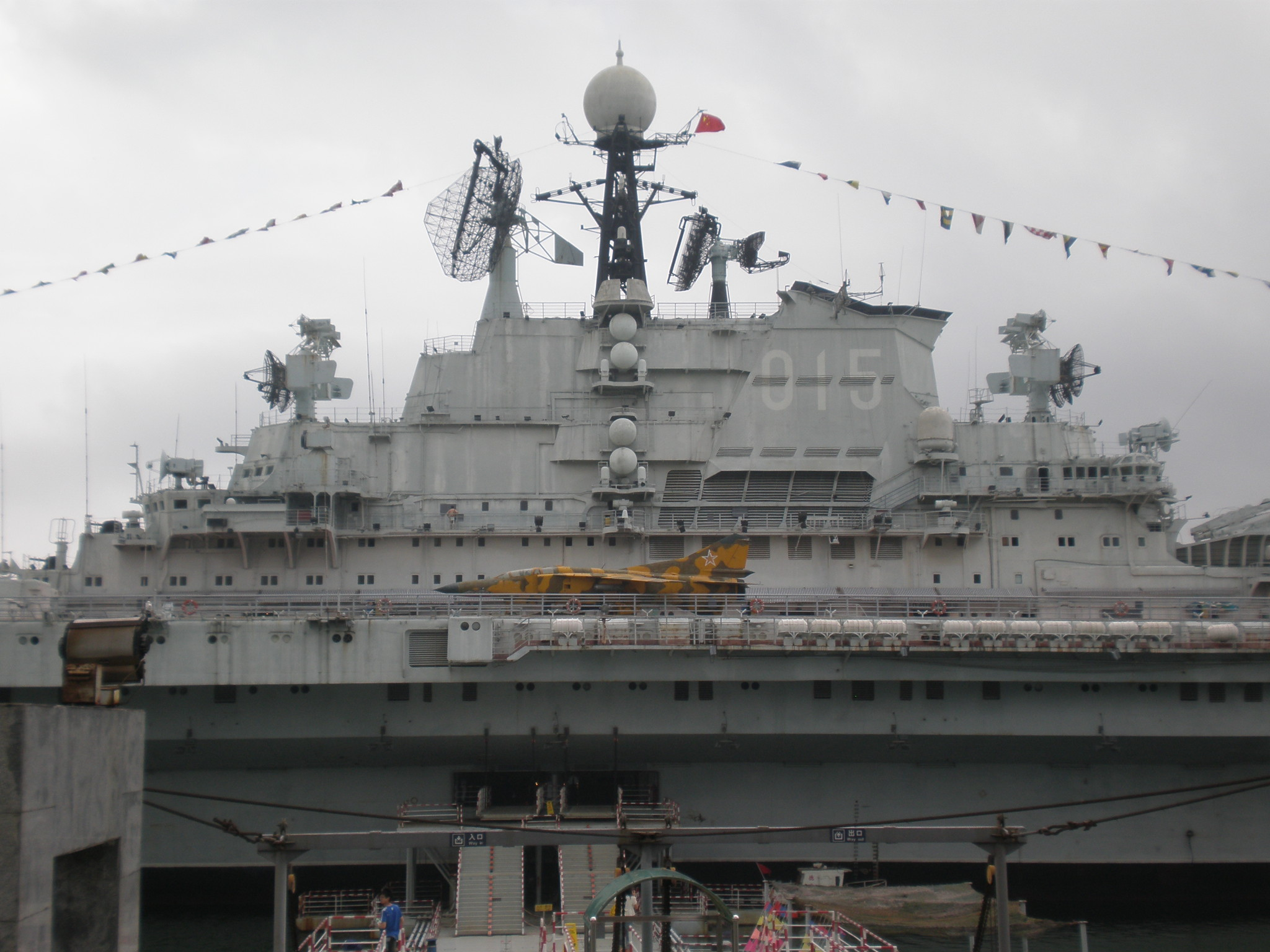
Minsk from shore

== See also ==
- List of parks in Shenzhen
