= Conformal fuel tank =

Type of external fuel tank for aircraft

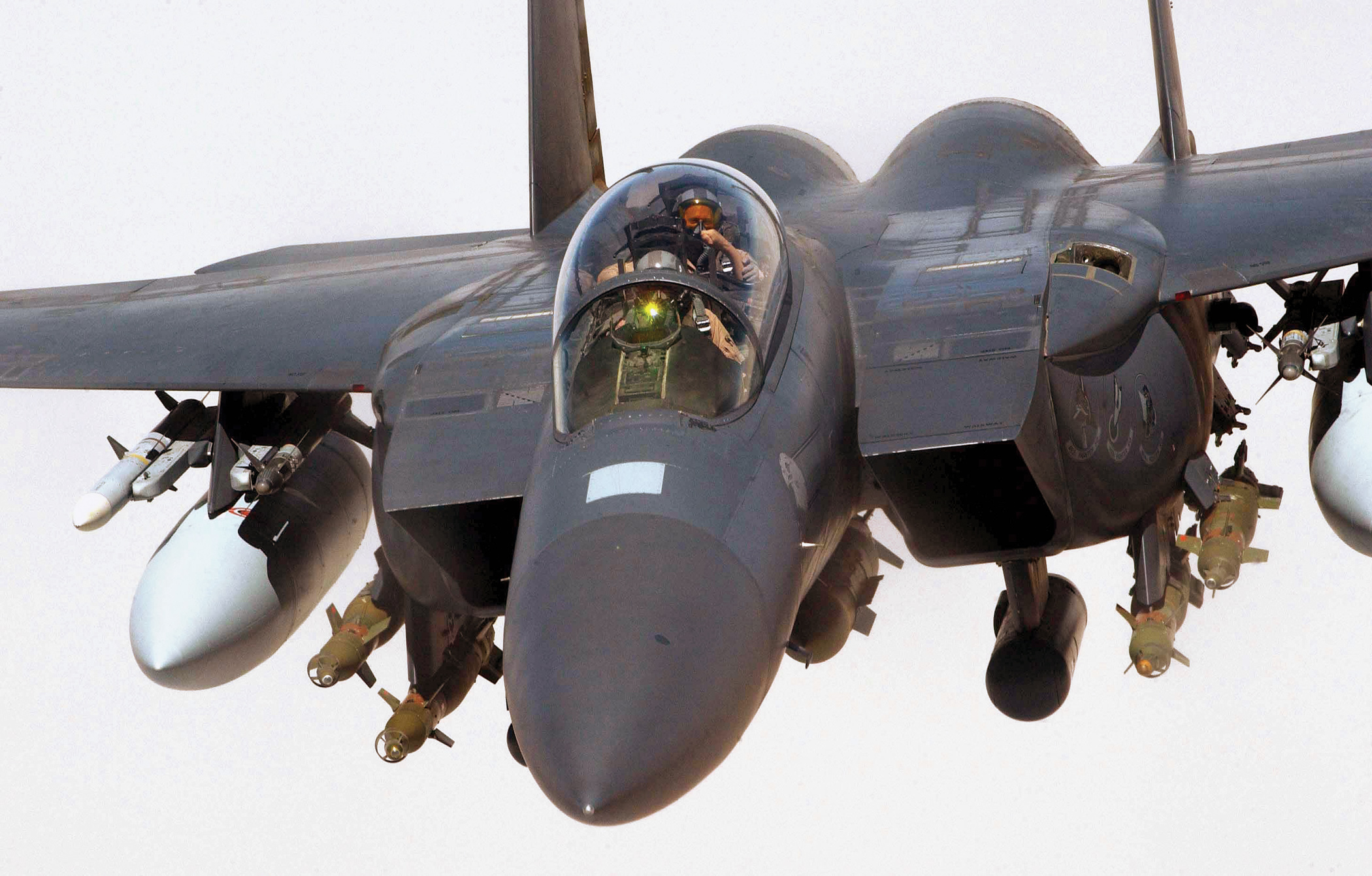
A McDonnell Douglas F-15E Strike Eagle fitted with conformal fuel tanks under the wing roots.

Conformal fuel tanks (CFTs) are additional fuel tanks fitted closely to the profile of an aircraft that extend the endurance of the aircraft.

== Advantages ==
CFTs have a reduced aerodynamic penalty compared to external drop tanks, and do not significantly increase an aircraft's radar cross-section. Another advantage CFTs provide is that they do not occupy ordnance hardpoints like drop tanks, allowing the aircraft to carry its full payload.

== Disadvantages ==
Conformal fuel tanks have the disadvantage that, unlike drop tanks, they cannot be discarded in flight, because they are plumbed into the aircraft and so can only be removed on the ground. As a result, they will impose a slight drag-penalty and minor weight gain on the aircraft even when the tanks are empty, without any benefit. They can also impose slight g-load limits, although not always an absolute issue: the CFTs on the F-15E allow the same maneuverability without g-limitations.

== Examples ==
=== Aircraft in service with conformal fuel tanks ===
F-15 family

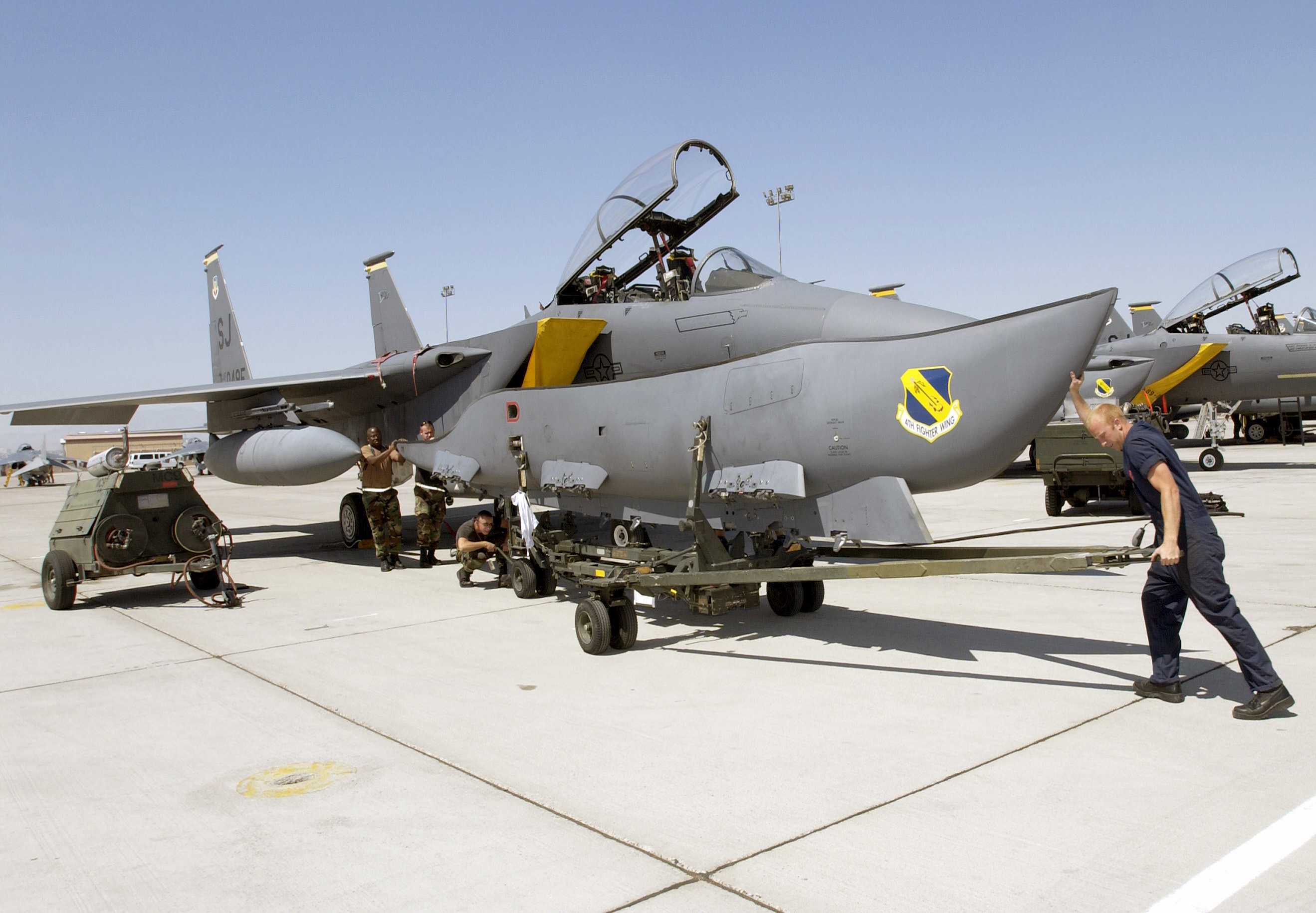
Ground crew handling the CFT of an F-15E

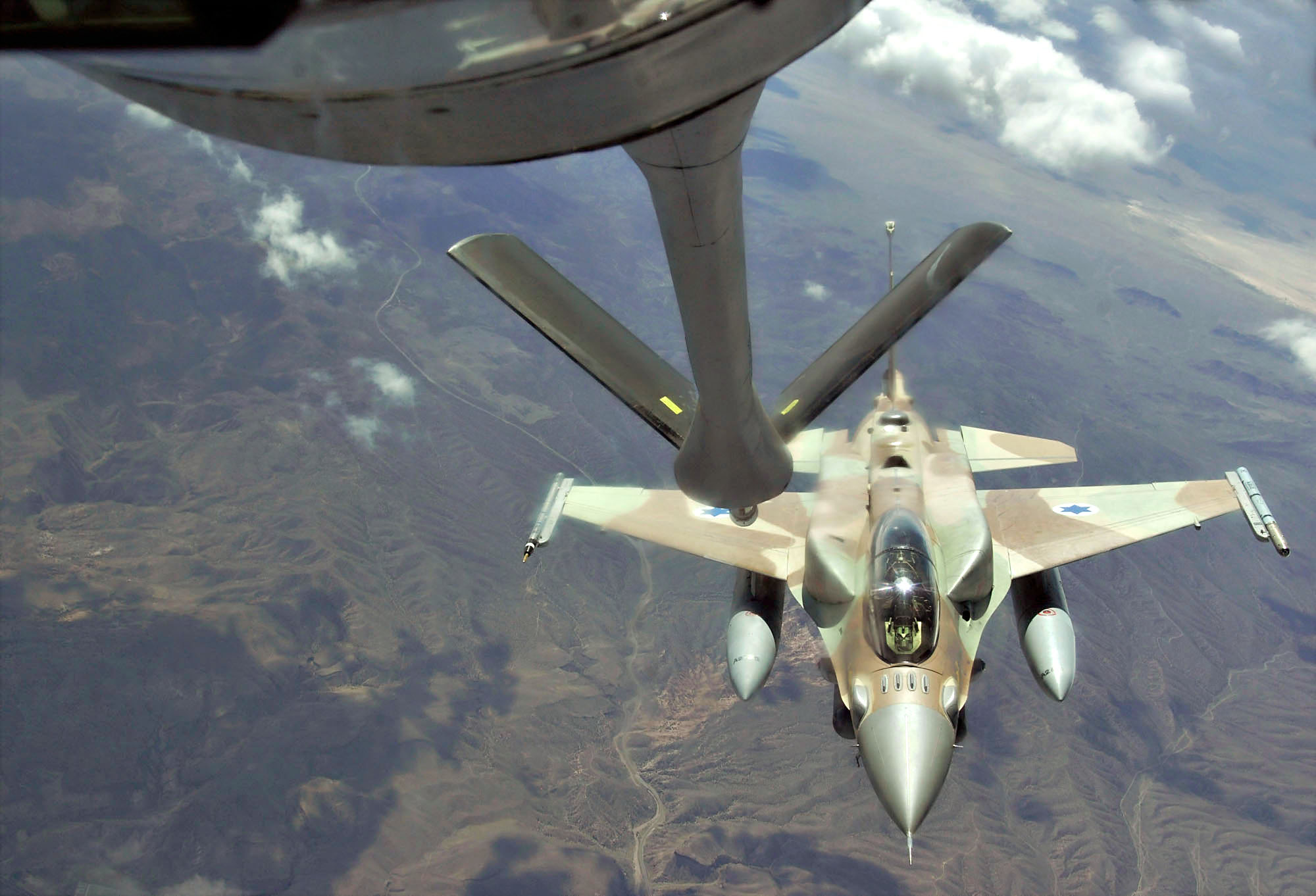
Israeli F-16I Sufa, based on the F-16D Block 50/52+, with 2 CFT on the wing root.

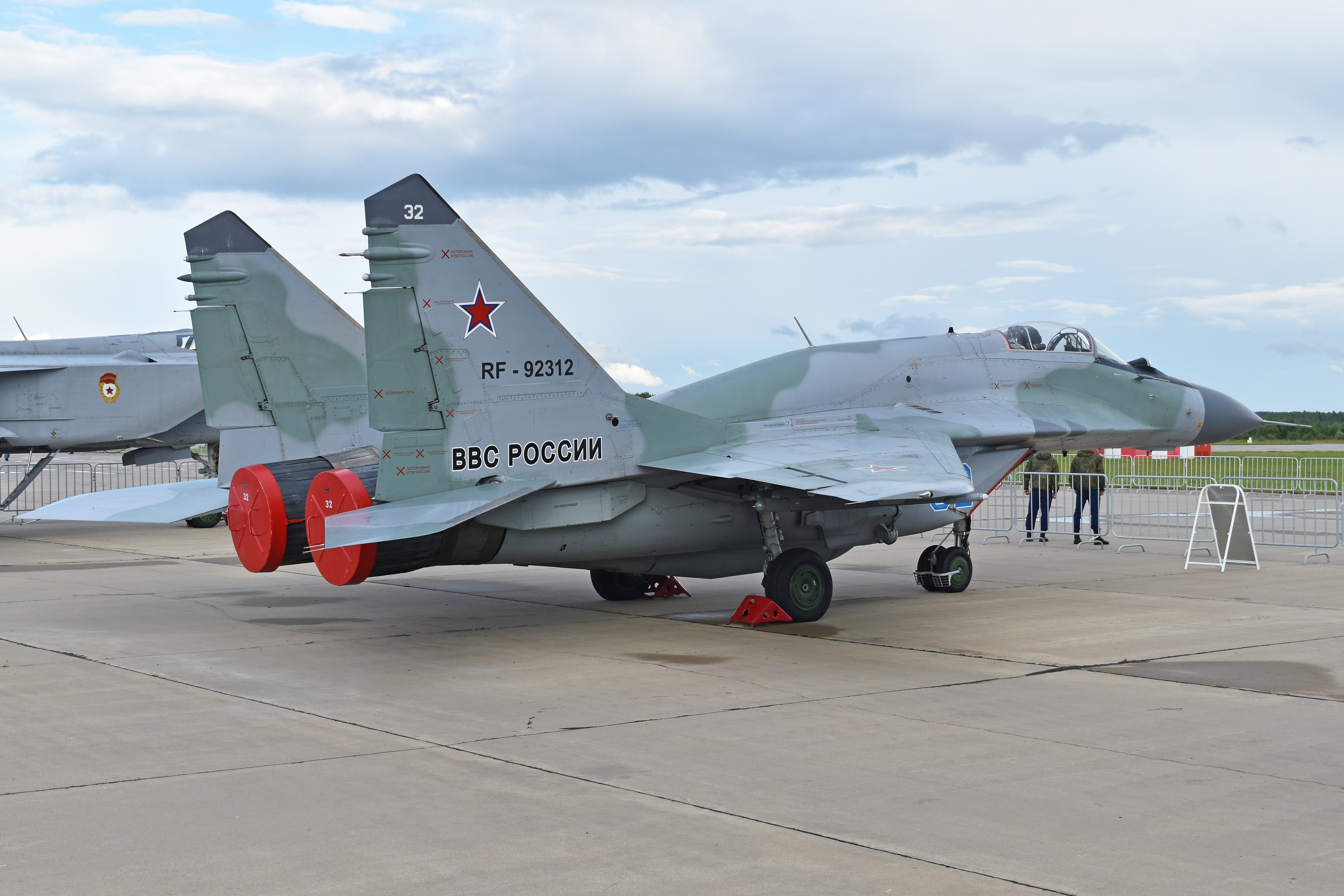
Russia MiG-29 SMT with the spinal conformal fuel tank

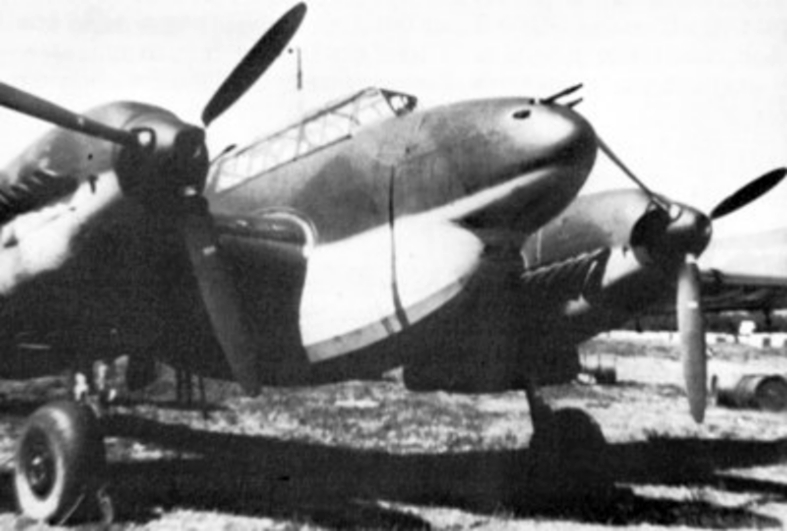
Bf 110D with Dackelbauch tank

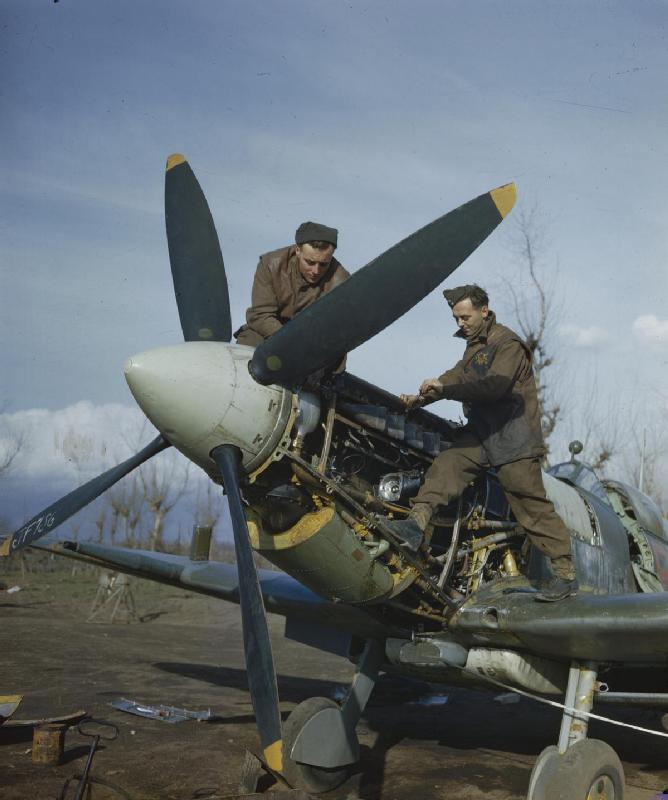
Supermarine Spitfire with a belly tank

From the F-15C Eagle, all the aircraft of the F-15 family were designed and built to receive the conformal fuel tanks. The aircraft in question are the F-15C Eagle, the F-15E Strike Eagle and the F-15EX Eagle II.
The tanks were initially known as FAST packs (for "Fuel And Sensor Tactical"). The first tests took place on the F-15B in 1974. Initially, the project intended to include navigational equipment and infrared targeting sensors on the FAST pack (thus "Fuel And Sensor"). But the sensor part of the concept was never implemented, instead specialised pods are being used by the F-15 family, such as the LANTIRN for ground-attack missions.
Each aircraft carries two tanks, with each 2,840 L (750 US gal) of extra fuel for a total of 5,680 L (1,500 US gal). Despite their presence, the F-15C kept the hardpoints on the side of the fuselage for 4 × AIM-7F Sparrow missiles or bombs, some of the hardpoints are on the side of the FAST packs.
Operators:
- F-15C/D Eagle:
  - USAF: some were retrofitted with CFT.
  - Royal Saudi Air Force: they are equipped with CFT.
- F-15E Strike Eagle:
  - USAF: most are equipped with CFT, but some are not using them on air-defence missions for an improved flight performance.
  - Republic of Korea Air Force: known locally as the F-15K Slam Eagle, equipped with the CFT.
  - Republic of Singapore Air Force: known locally as the F-15SG, equipped with the CFT.
- F-15EX Eagle II (note, the F-15EX Eagle II of the USAF were ordered without CFTs)
  - Qatar Emiri Air Force: the F-15QA (precursor of the F-15EX) are equipped with the CFT.
  - Royal Saudi Air Force: the F-15SA (precursor of the F-15EX) are equipped with the CFT.
F-15 - Israel
IAI (Israel Aerospace Industries) developed their own conformal fuel tanks and they are used on the Israeli F-15 (A/B, C/D, E, EX). These have been manufactured since 1984.
F-16
The F-16C/D Block 50/52+, the F-16E/F Block 60 and the F-16V Block 70/72 were reinforced structurally to receive two CFT mounted atop the aircraft near the wing root. Each tank adds a capacity of 850 L (220 US gal) for a total of 1,700 L (450 US gal). The first aircraft with CFT was a F-16E/F delivered to the UAE in 2004.
The current operators include: Bahrain, Bulgaria, Egypt, Greece, Morocco, Oman, Pakistan, Poland, Taiwan, Turkey, Singapore, Slovakia, UAE. Future operators: Peru (aircraft selected for procurement in 2026).
F-16 - Israel
IAI (Israel Aerospace Industries) developed their own conformal fuel tanks and they are used on the Israeli F-16I Sufa. Each tank adds a capacity of 850 L (220 US gal) for a total of 1,700 L (450 US gal).
Mikoyan MiG-29
The Mikoyan MiG-29 SMT is modified with an enlarged spine which is filled with an additional tank of 950 L (250 US gal).
The countries that purchased this upgrade are Russia, Algeria and Yemen, but the Yemeni variant isn't equipped with the conformal fuel tank.
Messerschmitt Bf 109
Some Bf 109 generation has a centerline belly tank.
Messerschmitt Bf 110D-0
It was only used on the Messerschmitt Bf 110D-0 variant. It was nicknamed "Dackelbauch" (Dachshund belly). Its capacity was of 1,050 L (280 US gal).
Supermarine Spitfire
It was known as a slipper drop tank. Multiple sizes existed:
- 30 imp gal (140 L; 36 US gal)
- 45 imp gal (200 L; 54 US gal)
- 90 imp gal (410 L; 110 US gal)
- 170 imp gal (770 L; 200 US gal)

=== Projects of aircraft with conformal fuel tanks ===
AIDC F-CK-1 Ching-kuo
The F-CK-1C (single-seat), and the F-CK-1D Brave Hawk (2-seater), are both prototypes. They have two CFT that are atop the wings, near the wing root.
Boeing F/A-18E/F Super Hornet
The US Navy planned to mount CFT on F/A-18 E/F Block III (and could have been retrofitted on Super Hornet E/F and Growler), but the plan was cancelled due to the practical considerations of space and maintenance at sea. Plus during some of the landing with the land-based arresting system (carrier landing simulator), the CFTs were heavily damaged due to the shock.
The total capacity was 1,950 L (520 US gal).
Chengdu J-10
Chengdu tested a design of CFT in a wind tunnel. They are located over the root of the wing.
Dassault Rafale
Dassault developed and tested a Rafale equipped with two CFT in April 2001. Each of the tank has a capacity of 1,150 L (300 US gal), for a total of 2,300 L (610 US gal). The tanks are located atop the fuselage, on each side of the spine.
Dassault exposed a Rafale equipped with CFT at the Paris Air Show 2025.
Eurofighter Typhoon
BAE Systems tested in a wing tunnel a variant of the Eurofighter equipped with two CFT located atop of the fuselage on each side of the spine. They were designed to be retrofitted on every Eurofighter T2 and T3.
Each of the tank has a capacity of 1,500 L (400 US gal), for a total of 3,000 L (790 US gal).
Saab Gripen
During the 2000s, Saab was assessing options to increase the range. One of the option was to add to CFT on the sides of the spine of the aircraft. The other that was later chosen was to develop the Gripen NG, which is today the Gripen E/F.

=== Examples of distended internal tanks ===
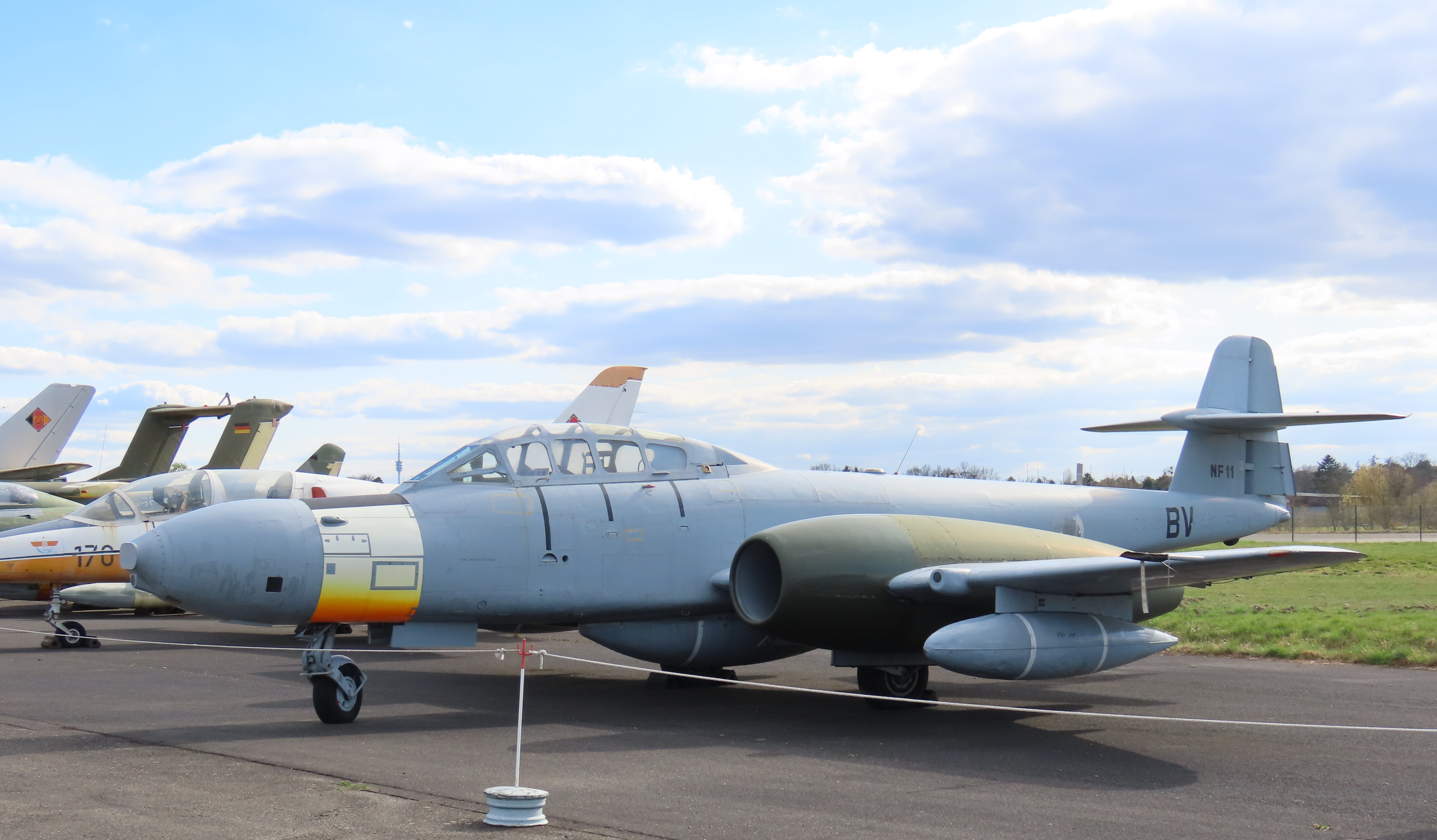
Gloster Meteor with a belly tank

Distended internal tanks are fuel tanks that either create a bulge in the fuselage, or are mounted flush with the fuselage.

English Electric Lightning
Conformal ventral store was used for a small or large belly fuel tank which bulges out from the underbody.
Gloster Javelin
Fitted with dual flush-mounted belly tanks with a capacity of 1,100 L (290 US gal). They were known as "bosom tanks" or "Sabrinas".
Gloster Meteor
Conformal ventral store was used for a large belly fuel tank which bulges out from the underbody.
Shenyang J-6
An underbelly tank known as ‘Gondola’ fuel tanks, used by the Pakistani Air Force.
Nanchang Q-5
The Q-5G is a Q-5E with a belly conformal tank.
The Q-5L had the option of a belly tank.
