= Oleg Grigoriyevich Kononenko =

Soviet cosmonaut (1938–1980)

- Born: 16 August 1938; Samarskoye, Rostov Oblast, Russian Soviet Federative Socialist Republic
- Died: 8 September 1980 (aged 42); South China Sea
- Occupation: Pilot
- Space career

Cosmonaut

Oleg Grigoriyevich Kononenko (16 August 1938 – 8 September 1980) was a member of Soviet cosmonaut group LII-1. He was born in the village of Samarskoye, in Rostov, Russia, then part of the Soviet Union. He graduated from Zhukovsky Air Force Institute in 1975. On 12 July 1977, he was selected for cosmonaut training as a pilot of the Buran space shuttle. He survived an aircraft ejection on the Soviet aircraft carrier Minsk on 27 December 1979. Kononenko was married three times and had four children. He was killed on 8 September 1980, in the crash of a Yakovlev Yak-38 VTOL fighter on takeoff from the Minsk in the South China Sea.

== Background ==
In 1958, Kononenko graduated as an instructor pilot at the Soviet Air Force academy in Saransk. In 1965, he also graduated as a test pilot at Zhukovskiy. Later, at the same academy, he became a helicopter pilot. In 1975, he graduated as a research pilot from the Moscow Aviation Institute.

== Career ==
On 12 July 1977, Kononenko was selected as a member of one of the classes of cosmonauts who were due to carry out missions in the future on the space shuttle Buran, the first Russian reusable spacecraft, at the time under development.

In 1979, he started his basic training for the position of cosmonaut. However, he maintained yet another degree, this time looking for the title of first-class test driver. Kononenko was in the final stages of his cosmonaut tests, when he was assigned to fly on a Yak-38 jet, taking off and landing vertically to perform some maneuvers over the China Sea as part of his training to obtain the first-class test pilot title.

== Fatal accident ==
On 8 September 1980, the test took off with this aircraft from the aircraft carrier Minsk. However, moments after taking off, one of the engines failed and the plane lost power, falling overboard before Kononenko had time to activate its ejector seat. The pilot died as soon as the plane violently hit the waters of the sea.

The crew of the aircraft carrier, from which he had taken off, immediately managed to recover his body. The ship then went to the city of Vladivostok, where Kononenko's body was left, and was later taken to Moscow, where he was buried with all honors.

Kononenko posthumously received the Order of Lenin medal (his second), but he was never officially considered a cosmonaut, as he died just a few months from the completion of basic training, which would give him this title.

== Subsequent cosmonaut fatalities ==
Less than two months after Kononenko's death, another Soviet cosmonaut lost his life in a plane crash. This time, the victim was Leonid Ivanov, who died in an accident with a Mig-23 jet.

On 9 September 1990, exactly ten years and one day after Kononenko's death, Rimantas Stankevičius, another Soviet cosmonaut, also died in an accident, during a performance at an air show in Italy.

== Namesakes ==
In 1996, Russia selected another cosmonaut, whose name, oddly enough, was also Oleg Kononenko. This one was called Oleg Dmitriyevich Kononenko. He participated in his first space mission together with the cosmonaut Sergey Volkov, having spent a season aboard the International Space Station.

This was not even the first occasion, when two namesake cosmonauts were chosen as such. Previously, a Russian cosmonaut named Aleksandr Pavlovich Aleksandrov and a cosmonaut from Bulgaria named Aleksandr Panayotov Aleksandrov had previously gone up into space.

== Bibliography ==
- Hall, Rex D.; Shayler, David J.; Vis, Bert (2005). Russia's Cosmonauts: Inside The Yuri Gagarin Training Center. Chichester, UK: Springer/Praxis. ISBN 9780387739755.
- Harvey, Brian (2007). The Rebirth Of The Russian Space Program: 50 Years After Sputnik, New Frontiers. Chichester, UK: Springer/Praxis. ISBN 978-0-387-71354-0.
- Hendrickx, Bart; Vis, Bert (2007). Energiya-Buran: The Soviet Space Shuttle. Chichester, UK: Springer/Praxis. ISBN 978-0387698489.
