= Soviet aircraft carrier Minsk =

1978 Kiev-class aircraft carrier

Coordinates: 31°48′14.25″N 120°59′25.41″E

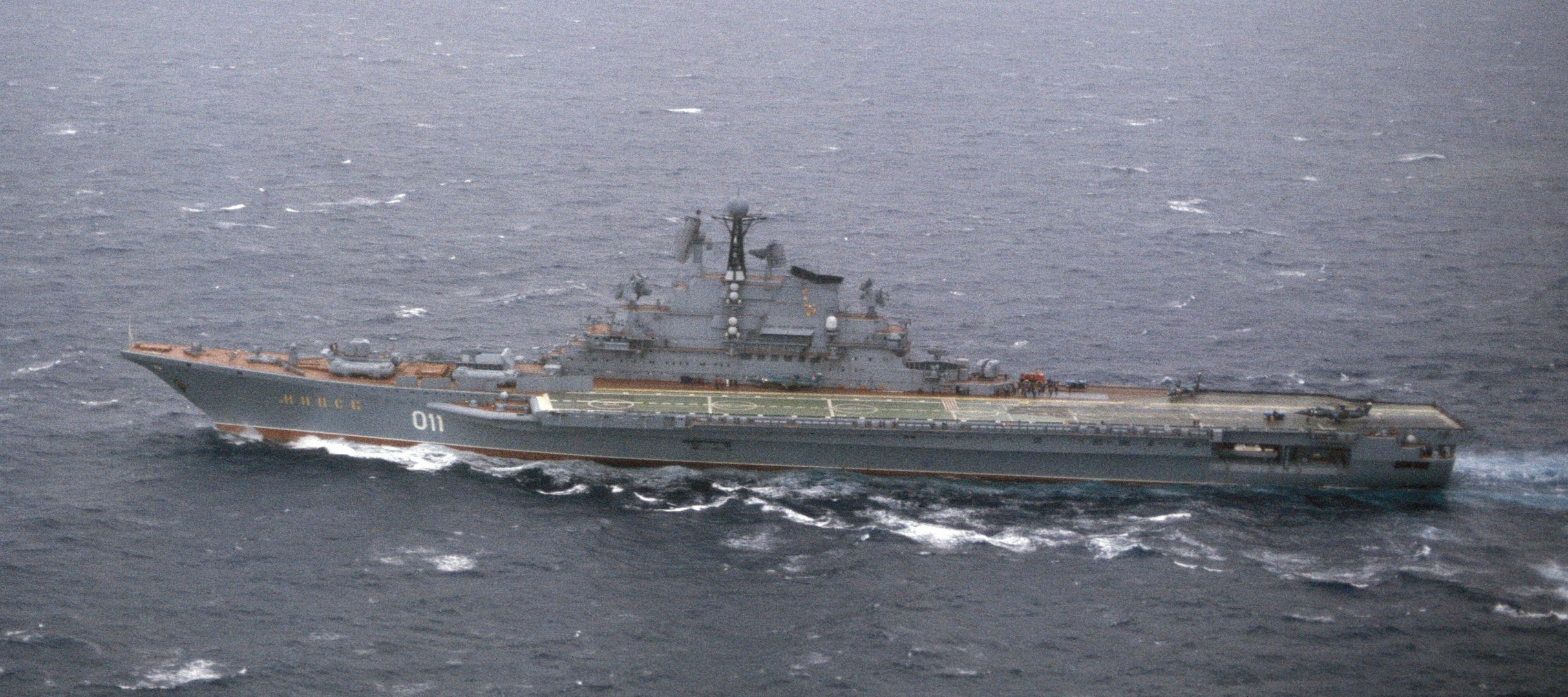
- Minsk in 1983

History

Russia
- Name: Minsk
- Namesake: City of Minsk
- Builder: Chernomorskiy yard, Mykolaiv
- Laid down: 28 December 1972
- Launched: 30 September 1975
- Commissioned: 27 September 1978
- Decommissioned: 30 June 1993
- Status: Sold to China in 1995; sold again and placed in Naval museum in Jiangsu, China since 2016. Severely damaged by fire on 16 August 2024

General characteristics
- Class & type: Kiev-class aircraft cruiser
- Displacement: 30,535 tons (standard); 41,380 tons (loaded)
- Length: 273 m (896 ft) overall
- Beam: 49.2 m (161 ft) o/a; 31 m (102 ft) w/l
- Draught: 8.94 m (29.3 ft)
- Propulsion: 4 shaft geared steam turbines, 140,000 shp
- Speed: 32 knots (59 km/h)
- Endurance: 13,500 nautical miles (25,000 km) at 18 knots (33 km/h)
- Armament: 4 × twin SS-N-12 Sandbox SSM launchers (8 missiles); 2 × twin SA-N-3 Shtorm SAM launchers (72 missiles); 2 × twin SA-N-4 Gecko SAM launchers (40 missiles); 2 × twin 76 mm guns; 8 × AK-630 30 mm CIWS; 10 × 533 mm torpedo tubes; 1 × twin SUW-N-1 ASW rocket launcher (16 nuclear-tipped rockets); 2 × RBU-6000 anti-submarine rocket launchers
- Aircraft carried: 16 Yak-38M fighter aircraft; 18 Kamov Ka-25 or Kamov Ka-27 helicopters

Minsk (Russian: Минск) is an aircraft carrier (heavy aircraft cruiser in Russian classification) (Note: Due to restrictions imposed by the Montreux Convention limiting the tonnage of aircraft carriers traveling through the Bosporus, all Soviet and Russian aircraft carriers are named as aircraft carrying cruisers. In the case of Minsk, this accurately reflects the ship's mission and weapons fit.) that served the Soviet Navy and the Russian Navy from 1978 to 1994. She was the second Kiev-class vessel to be built.

From 2000 to 2016 she was a theme park known as Minsk World in Shatoujiao, Yantian, Shenzhen, China.

In April 2016, Minsk was towed to Jiangsu for exhibition. On 16 August 2024, she caught fire in Nantong, Jiangsu province.

== History ==
=== Russian service ===
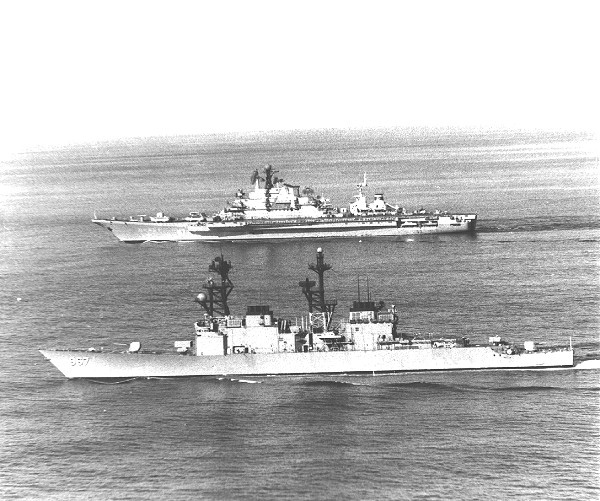
Minsk being shadowed by the US destroyer USS Elliot during her 1979 Pacific cruise

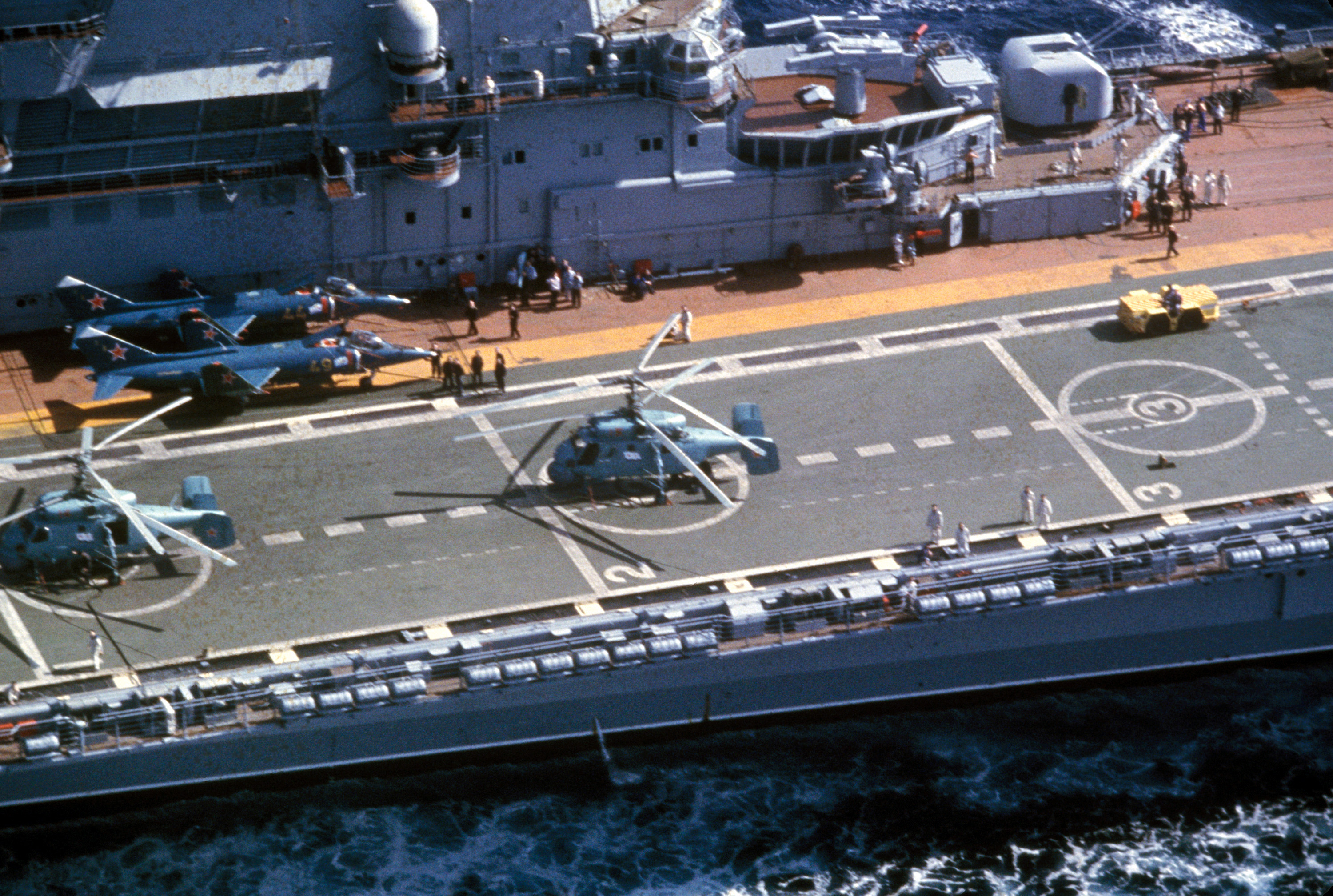
Kamov Ka-25 'Hormone' helicopters and Yakovlev Yak-38 'Forger' VTOL strike fighters parked on the flight deck of Minsk in 1986

Named after the capital city of Belarus, Minsk was laid down in 1972, launched on 30 September 1975, completed on 27 September 1978.

Minsk operated with the Pacific Fleet. Shortly after the Sino-Vietnamese War of 1979, Minsk was deployed to the South China Sea, making a port of call at Cam Ranh Bay, Vietnam, in September 1980. She visited Vietnam again in 1982 during her second deployment before sailing onto the Indian Ocean. In 1984, Minsk, the Ivan Rogov-class landing ship Aleksandr Nikolayev, and Vietnam forces conducted the Soviet Navy's first amphibious landing in Vietnam.

Soviet cosmonaut Oleg Grigoriyevich Kononenko survived an aircraft ejection on the Minsk in 1979. On September 8, 1980, he was killed in the crash of a Yakovlev Yak-38 VTOL fighter on the Minsk.

The carrier was retired, and decommissioned on 30 June 1993, as a result of a major accident (details not known) which required the facilities at the Chernomorskiy yard, in Mykolayiv, located in the newly independent Ukraine (the reasons for not attempting a repair are not known).

=== Shenzhen Minsk World, China ===
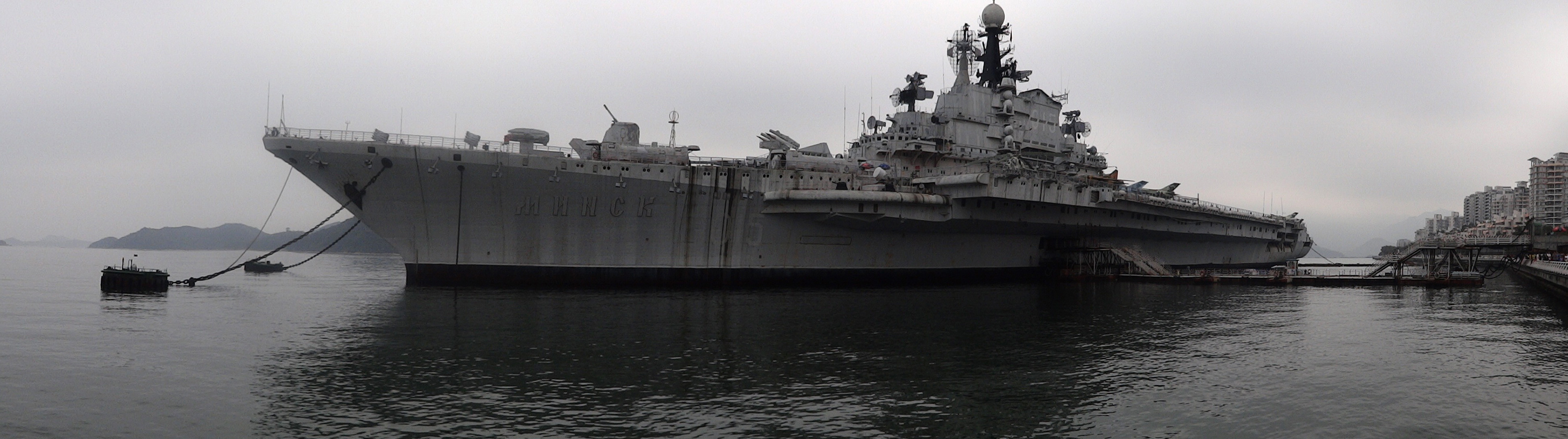
Minsk at Minsk World, Shenzhen, China

In 1995 Minsk was sold for scrap to a South Korean company. Due to protests from South Korean environmentalists, the ship was resold to the Chinese state-owned Guangdong Ship Dismantling Company. The ship was again saved from the scrapyard when a group of Chinese video-game arcade owners formed the Shenzhen Minsk Investment Company to buy the ship for $4.3 million.

Minsk became the centerpiece of a military theme park in Yantian district, Shatoujiao (沙头角) sub-district, Shenzhen called Minsk World. However, the Shenzhen Minsk company went bankrupt in 2006, and the carrier was put up for auction on 22 March 2006. On 31 May 2006, the carrier was sold in Shenzhen for 128 million RMB to CITIC Shenzhen.

The ship was again sold to Dalian Yongjia Group, a real estate company in Dalian in North China, on 1 January 2013. On 3 April 2016, Chinese news reported the aircraft carrier had been towed to a new destination, Zhoushan for refit, because of the decline of the number of tourists after 2006.

After the completion of the refit, the ship was to be taken to Nantong on the Yangtse River in Jiangsu Province and moored to the west of Sutong Yangtze River Bridge as part of a new theme park which was planned to open in 2017. As of 2018, the project was delayed.

On 16 August 2024, the ship caught fire during further refit work in Nantong. Although the fire could be extinguished, the future of the ship as a centerpiece of another theme park became uncertain.

== See also ==
- List of aircraft carriers of Russia and the Soviet Union
