= Shatoujiao Subdistrict =

Subdistrict in Shenzhen, Guangdong

Coordinates: 22.5518°N 114.2287°E

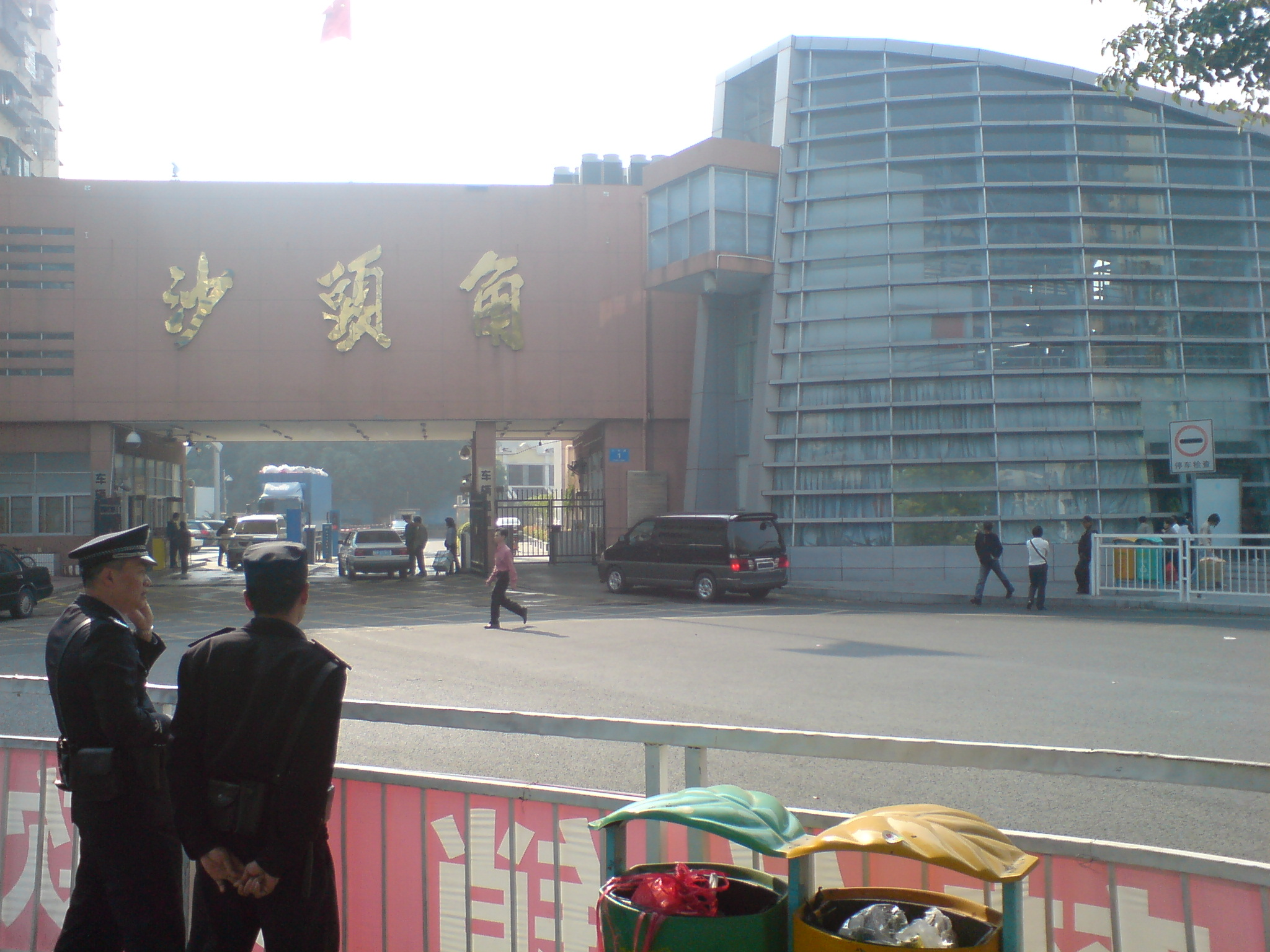
- Shatoujiao Port Control Point
- Simplified Chinese: 沙头角
- Traditional Chinese: 沙頭角
Transcriptions
Standard Mandarin
- Hanyu Pinyin: Shātóujiǎo
- Wade–Giles: Sha^{1}-t‘ou^{2}-chiao^{3}
- IPA: [ʂá.tʰǒʊ.tɕjàʊ]
Hakka
- Romanization: Sa^{1}tiu^{2}gok^{5}
Yue: Cantonese
- Yale Romanization: Sātàuhgok
- Jyutping: saa1 tau4 gok3
- IPA: [sa˥.tʰɐw˩.kɔk̚˧]

Shatoujiao is a subdistrict of Yantian District, Shenzhen, Guangdong, located on the border of Shenzhen and Hong Kong, China. The population is mainly composed of migrant workers from all parts of China along with a small number of Russians. Shatoujiao is a port with cargo coming into and exiting Yantian. It has a road connecting to Luohu, with regular bus services to Shenzhen's main train terminus and through connections to Guangzhou. The subdistrict lies near a highway that links to Meixian and Chaozhou while the Shenzhen railway is also part of the transport links between Hong Kong and Beijing.

== English Name ==
In Hong Kong, the name Shatoujiao is written as Sha Tau Kok, reflecting the Cantonese pronunciation. Although Shatoujiao and Sha Tau Kok are written using the same Chinese characters, today, Shatoujiao usually refers to the town on the mainland side of the border, while Sha Tau Kok refers to the town on the Hong Kong side.

== Economy ==
=== Development Zone ===
- Shenzhen Shatoujiao Free Trade Zone

Established in 1987, Shenzhen Shatoujiao Free Trade Zone was one of the first free trade zones in China approved by the State Council. It is only 1 kilometre (0.62 mi) from Yantian Port. Industries encouraged in the zone include shipping, warehousing and logistics.

=== Minsk World ===
Minsk World was a military theme park that operated in Shatoujiao between 2000 and 2016. It was centered on the Soviet aircraft carrier Minsk, which functioned as a museum.

=== Chung Ying Street ===
Chung Ying Street divides Shatoujiao and Sha Tau Kok, Hong Kong.

In 1999, the Chung Ying Street historical Museum, situated near the harbour on the mainland Chinese side of Chung Ying Street was built to celebrate the transfer of sovereignty over Hong Kong. It has on display a history of Sha Tau Kok and its place in the incorporation of territory into British Hong Kong at the end of the 19th century. A bronze Peace Bell was installed nearby.

== See also ==
- Sha Tau Kok, Hong Kong side of the same settlement divided by the leasing New Territories to Britain in 1899
