= Soviet frigate Bessmennyy =

Krivak-class frigate

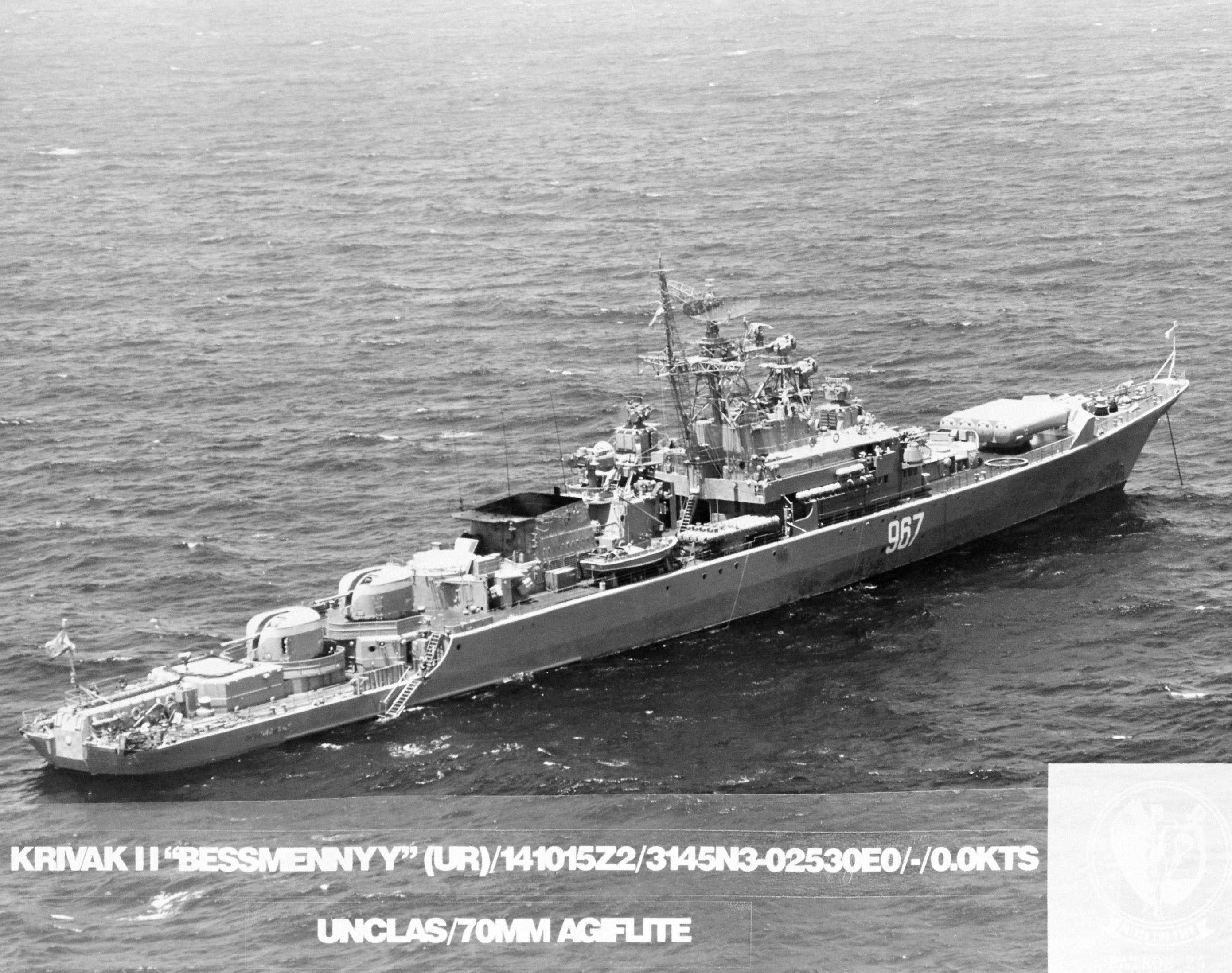
- Bessmennyy anchored at sea in 1989.

History

Soviet Union → Russia
- Name: Bessmennyy
- Namesake: Russian for Permanent
- Builder: Yantar shipyard, Kaliningrad
- Yard number: 165
- Laid down: 1 November 1977
- Launched: 9 August 1978
- Commissioned: 26 December 1978
- Decommissioned: 16 March 1998
- Fate: Broken up in Severomorsk

General characteristics
- Class & type: Project 1135M Burevestnik frigate
- Displacement: 2,935 t (2,889 long tons; 3,235 short tons) (standard); 3,305 t (3,253 long tons; 3,643 short tons) (full load)
- Length: 123 m (403 ft 7 in)
- Beam: 14.2 m (46 ft 7 in)
- Draft: 4.5 m (14 ft 9 in)
- Installed power: 44,000 shp (33,000 kW)
- Propulsion: 4 gas turbines; COGAG; 2 shafts
- Speed: 32 kn (59 km/h)
- Range: 3,900 nmi (7,223 km) at 14 kn (26 km/h)
- Complement: 23 officers, 171 ratings
- Sensors & processing systems: MR-310A Angara-A air/surface search radar; Don navigational radar; MR-143 Lev-214 fire control radar; MG-332T Titan-2T, MG-325 Vega, 2 MG-7 Braslet and MGS-400K sonars
- Electronic warfare & decoys: MP-401S Start-S radar; Spectrum-F laser warning system; PK-16 decoy-dispenser system
- Armament: 4 × URPK-5 Rastrub (SS-N-14 'Silex') anti-submarine and anti-shipping missiles (1×4); 4 × ZIF-122 4K33 launchers (2×2) with 40 4K33 OSA-M (SA-N-4'Gecko') surface to air missiles (2×2); 2 × 100 mm (4 in) AK-100 guns (2×1); 2 × RBU-6000 Smerch-2 anti-submarine rockets; 8 × 533 mm (21 in) torpedo tubes (2×4)

Bessmennyy (Russian: Бессменный, "Inquisitive") was a Project 1135M Burevestnik-class (Russian: Буревестник, "Petrel") Guard Ship (Сторожевой Корабль, SKR) or 'Krivak II'-class frigate that served with the Soviet and Russian Navies. The vessel was the seventh of the class to enter service. Launched on 17 September 1977, Bessmennyy was designed to operate as an anti-submarine vessel with the Northern Fleet, using an armament built around the Metel Anti-Ship Complex. Following the dissolution of the Soviet Union, in 1991, the ship was transferred to the Russian Navy and took part in a pioneering visit to Gibraltar two years later, the first time that Russian warships had visited the territory in living memory. Bessmennyy was retired on 16 March 1998, disarmed and subsequently broken up.

== Design and development ==
Bessmennyy was one of eleven Project 1135M ships launched between 1975 and 1981. Project 1135, the Burevestnik (Russian: Буревестник, "Petrel") class, was envisaged by the Soviet Navy as a less expensive complement to the Project 1134A Berkut A (NATO reporting name 'Kresta II') and Project 1134B Berkut B (NATO reporting name 'Kara') classes of anti-submarine ships. Project 1135M was an improvement developed in 1972 with slightly increased displacement and heavier guns compared with the basic 1135. The design, by N. P. Sobolov, combined a powerful missile armament with good seakeeping for a blue water role. The ships were designated Guard Ship (Сторожевой Корабль, SKR) to reflect their substantial greater anti-ship capability than the earlier members of the class, and the Soviet strategy of creating protected areas for friendly submarines close to the coast. NATO forces called the vessels 'Krivak II'-class frigates.

Displacing 2,935 tonnes (2,889 long tons; 3,235 short tons) standard and 3,305 t (3,253 long tons; 3,643 short tons) full load, Bessmennyy was 123 m (403 ft 7 in) long overall, with a beam of 14.2 m (46 ft 7 in) and a draught of 4.5 m (14 ft 9 in). Power was provided by two 22,000-shaft-horsepower (16,000 kW) M7K power sets, each consisting of a combination of a 17,000 shp (13,000 kW) DK59 and a 5,000 shp (3,700 kW) M62 gas turbine arranged in a COGAG installation and driving one fixed-pitch propeller. Design speed was 32 knots (59 km/h; 37 mph) and range 3,900 nautical miles (7,223 km; 4,488 mi) at 14 kn (26 km/h; 16 mph). The ship’s complement was 194, including 23 officers.

=== Armament and sensors ===
Bessmennyy was designed for anti-submarine warfare around four URPK-5 Rastrub missiles (NATO reporting name SS-N-14 'Silex'), backed up by a pair of quadruple launchers for 533 mm (21 in) torpedoes and a pair of RBU-6000 213 mm (8 in) Smerch-2 anti-submarine rocket launchers. Both the URPK-5 and the torpedoes also had anti-ship capabilities. Defence against aircraft was provided by forty 4K33 OSA-M (SA-N-4 'Gecko') surface to air missiles which were launched from two twin-arm ZIF-122 launchers. Two 100 mm (4 in) AK-100 guns were mounted aft in a superfiring arrangement.

The ship had a well-equipped sensor suite, including a single MR-310A Angara-A air/surface search radar, Don navigation radar, the MP-401S Start-S ESM radar system and the Spectrum-F laser warning system. Fire control for the guns was provided by a MR-143 Lev-214 radar. An extensive sonar complex was fitted, including the bow-mounted MG-332T Titan-2T and the towed-array MG-325 Vega that had a range of up to 15 kilometres (9.3 mi). The vessel was also equipped with the PK-16 decoy-dispenser system which used chaff as a form of missile defense.

== Construction and career ==
Laid down by on 1 November 1977 with the yard number 165 at the Yantar Shipyard in Kaliningrad, Bessmennyy was launched on 9 August 1978. The ship was the seventh of the newer Project 1135M 'Krivak-II' class built at the yard. The vessel, named for a Russian word that can be translated as permanent, was commissioned on 26 December and joined the Northern Fleet. On 10 November 1982, the ship took part in an amphibious assault exercise with other members of the Soviet Navy,

With the dissolution of the Soviet Union on 26 December 1991, Bessmennyy was transferred to the Russian Navy. In 1993, the frigate joined sister ships Druzhnyy and Legkiy in visiting Gibraltar. It was the first time in living memory that Russian vessels had visited the territory and the crews took part in various activities with sailors from the Royal Navy, including ten pin bowling. Afterwards, the ship was to have joined a joint exercise in the Mediterranean Sea, but instead was sent to the Suez Canal to support the release of a Russian tug.

After nearly twenty years in service, Bessmennyy was decommissioned on 16 March 1998, disarmed and broken up.
