= List of ship commissionings in 1975 =

The list of ship commissionings in 1975 includes a chronological list of all ships commissioned in 1975.

	Operator	Ship	Flag	Class and type	Pennant	Other notes
25 January	United States Navy	South Carolina		California-class cruiser	CGN-37	
3 May	United States Navy	Nimitz		Nimitz-class aircraft carrier	CVN-68	First in class
15 May	Rederi AB Svea	Svea Corona	Sweden	Ferry		For Silja Line traffic
9 July	Finland Steamship Company	Wellamo	Finland	Ferry		For Silja Line traffic
20 September	United States Navy	Spruance		Spruance-class destroyer	DD-963	
30 September	Soviet Navy	Druzhny		Project 1135 large anti-submarine ship	200	
3 October	Royal Netherlands Navy	Tromp		Tromp-class frigate	F801	First in class
25 November	Soviet Navy	Marshal Timoshenko		Project 1134A Berkut A large anti-submarine ship	251	
11 December	Finnlines	Bore Star	Finland	Ferry (used as a cruise ship)		Chartered from Steamship Company Bore; marketed under the name Finnpartner
28 December	Soviet Navy	Kiev		Kiev-class aircraft carrier		First in class
