= Nadezhda Nikitina =

Ukrainian cultural figure, recipient of Order of Princess Olga

Nadezhda Mikhailovna Nikitina
- Born: February 9, 1951; Novomyrhorod, Kirovohrad region, Ukrainian SSR, Soviet Union
- Died: December 20, 2021 (aged 70); Kyiv, Ukraine
- Known for: Film industry, charity.

Nadezhda Mikhailovna Nikitina (Ukrainian: Надія Михайлівна Нікітіна, Russian: Надежда Михайловна Никитина; February 9, 1951, Novomyrhorod, Ukrainian SSR, Soviet Union – December 20, 2021, Kyiv, Ukraine) was a Ukrainian cultural figure and activist, entrepreneur, and philanthropist. She was honored as Merited Culture Worker of Ukraine and a recipient of the Order of Princess Olga for her contributions to the country's cultural development. Nikitina worked in the film industry for over 30 years and was the head of "Kinomir" state cinema association, organized film festivals, and was involved in social and charity activities.

== Biography ==
Nadezhda Nikitina was born in Novomyrhorod, Kirovohrad region, Ukraine. She graduated from the pedagogical college in Oleksandriia, Kirovohrad region, and began her career as a school teacher and a counselor at the international children's camp "Artek". In 1976, she moved to Sevastopol, where she focused on developing the city's film industry.

For more than three decades, Nikitina played a key role in the film sector of Sevastopol. She was the director of the children's cinema "Druzhba" and later headed the municipal enterprise "Kinomir", which managed several city cinemas, including "Pobeda", "Ukraina" and "Druzhba." Under her leadership, these venues became the cultural hubs. She collaborated with national culture organizations and funds, foreign embassies to organize international arthouse film festivals in Sevastopol.

Beyond the film industry, Nikitina was involved in real estate and urban development projects in Sevastopol. She contributed to the city’s infrastructure through construction and property development initiatives, supporting the growth of both commercial and residential areas.

In 2010, she ran as a candidate for deputy in Sevastopol's single-member electoral district No.12, but was not elected. Following the death of her husband, she relocated to Kyiv in 2012.

After moving to Kyiv, Nikitina actively supported the Euromaidan movement and cultural-patriotic initiatives. She opposed unlawful actions in the film distribution sector and advocated for fair policies in the Ukrainian cultural industry. As an orphan, Nadezhda Nikitina was deeply committed to supporting children without parental care. She organized charity film screenings for orphans and sponsored various social programs. She also provided financial assistance to military hospitals and officers' homes in Ukraine. In 2017, she became a patron of the "Nadiya" awards, which honored Ukrainian military personnel. In 2019, she was sponsored the installation of a monument to Ivan Bohun.

Died 20 December 2021 in Kyiv.

== Personal life ==
Nadezhda Nikitina was married to Ihor Mykolayovych Nikitin (1957–2011), commander of the Fifth Brigade of the Ukrainian Navy, the first Ukrainian frigate "Sevastopol". Daughter Oleksandra Nikitina (born 1989), a model, winner of "The Sevastopol Beauty 2008" beauty contest, founder of the educational project "Prisma Lecture"
