= Russian frigate Anadyr =

Krivak-class frigate

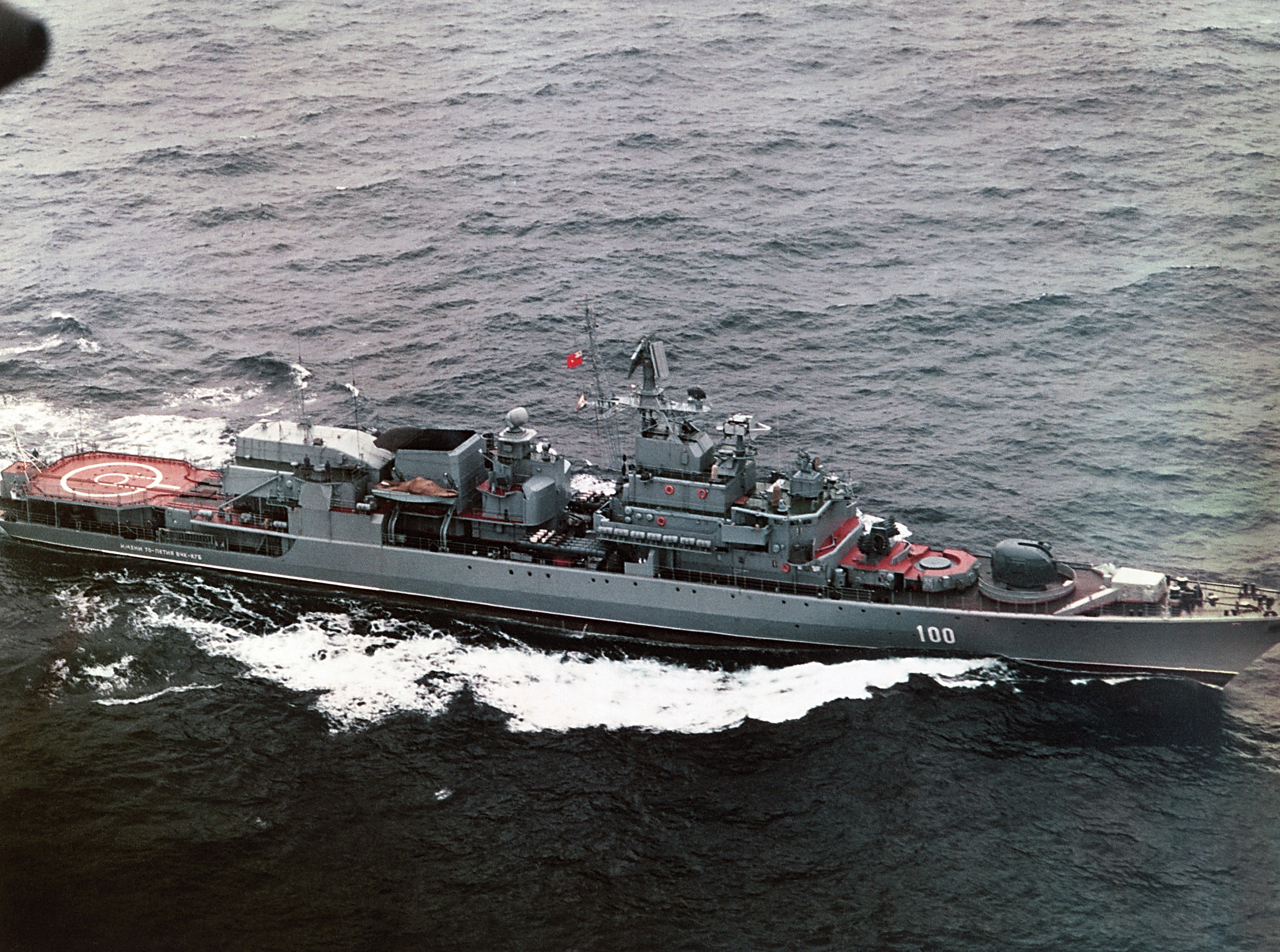
- Sister ship Imeni 70-letiya VChk-KGB underway at sea on late 1980s

History

→ Soviet Union → Russia
- Name: Imeni 70-letiya Pogranvoysk
- Renamed: Anadyr
- Namesake: 70th anniversary of Border Troops; Town of Anadyr
- Builder: Zaliv Shipyard, Kerch
- Yard number: 205
- Laid down: 2 April 1987
- Launched: 28 March 1988
- Commissioned: 30 December 1988
- Decommissioned: 24 April 2002
- Stricken: 2003
- Status: Retired

General characteristics
- Class & type: Project 11351 Nerey frigate
- Displacement: 3,180 t (3,130 long tons) (standard); 3,670 t (3,610 long tons) (full)
- Length: 123 m (403 ft 7 in)
- Beam: 14.2 m (46 ft 7 in)
- Draught: 5 m (16 ft 5 in)
- Installed power: 63,000 shp (47,000 kW)
- Propulsion: 4 gas turbines; COGAG; 2 shafts
- Speed: 32 kn (59 km/h)
- Range: 3,900 nmi (7,223 km) at 14 kn (26 km/h)
- Complement: 192
- Sensors & processing systems: MR-760 Fregat-MA air/surface search radar; Vaigach-Nayada navigational radar; MR-184 Lev fire control radar; Vympel-A fire control radar; MGK-335S Platina-S sonar; MG-345 Bronza towed sonar
- Electronic warfare & decoys: MP-401 Start ESM; PK-16 and PK-10 chaff launchers
- Armament: 2 × ZIF-122 4K33 launchers (1×2) with 20 4K33 OSA-M (SA-N-4'Gecko') SAMs (1×2); 1 × 100 mm (4 in) AK-100 gun; 2 × 30 mm (1 in) AK-630M CIWS; 2 × RBU-6000 Smerch-2 anti-submarine rockets; 8 × 533 mm (21 in) torpedo tubes (2×4); 16 × naval mines
- Aircraft carried: 1 × Kamov Ka-27PS
- Aviation facilities: Helipad and hangar

Anadyr (Russian: Анадырь) was a Project 11351 Nerey-class frigate (NATO reporting name Krivak III) of the Coast Guard of the Federal Security Service of Russia. Previously the ship served in the KGB Border Troops Naval Service as Imeni 70-letiya Pogranvoysk (Имени 70-летия Погранвойск).

== Design and description ==
Anadyr was one of nine Project 11351 ships launched between 1982 and 1992. Project 11351, the Nerey (Russian: Нерей, "Nereus") class, was the patrol version of the Project 1135 Burevestnik for the Soviet Maritime Border Troops. The ships were designated Border Patrol Ship (пограничный сторожевой корабль, PSKR) to reflect their role as patrol ships of the Border Troops. In comparison to other members of the class, Project 11351 ships has a helipad and hangar for a Kamov Ka-27PS search-and-rescue helicopter astern, in exchange to losing one 100 mm gun, one twin-arm surface-to-air missile launcher and the URPK-5 Rastrub (SS-N-14 'Silex') anti-ship missile launchers. NATO classified the vessels as 'Krivak III'-class frigates.

Anadyr was 123 m (403 ft 7 in) long overall, with a beam of 14.2 m (46 ft 7 in) and a draught of 5 m (16 ft 5 in). Displacing 3,180 t (3,130 long tons) standard and 3,670 t (3,610 long tons) full load, the ship's power were provided by two 22,500 shp (16,800 kW) DT59 and two 9,000 shp (6,700 kW) DS71 gas turbines arranged in a COGAG installation, driving two fixed-pitch propellers. Design speed was 32 knots (59 km/h; 37 mph) and range 3,900 nautical miles (7,223 km; 4,488 mi) at 14 kn (26 km/h; 16 mph). The ship's complement was 192, including 31 officers.

=== Armament and sensors ===
Anadyr was armed with one 100 mm (4 in) AK-100 gun mounted forward of the bridge and two AK-630M close-in weapon system autocannons mounted on each side of the helicopter hangar. Defence against aircraft was provided by twenty 4K33 OSA-M (SA-N-4 'Gecko') surface-to-air missiles which were launched from one set of twin-arm ZIF-122 launchers, mounted aft of the fore 100 mm gun. For anti-submarine warfare, the ship were equipped with a pair of RBU-6000 213 mm (8 in) Smerch-2 12-barrel anti-submarine rocket launchers and a pair of PTA-53-1135 quadruple launchers for 533 mm (21 in) torpedoes, consisted of either 53-65K wake homing torpedo or SET-65 anti-submarine homing torpedo. The ship can also carry 16 naval mines.

The ship sensor suites includes Sapfir-U7 combat management system, a single MR-760 Fregat-MA air/surface search radar, one Vaigach-Nayada navigation radar, and the MP-401 Start Electronic Support Measures (ESM) system. Fire control for the guns consisted of MR-184 Lev radar for the 100 mm gun and Vympel-A radar for the 30 mm autocannons. An extensive sonar complex was fitted, including the bow-mounted MGK-335S Platina-S and the towed-array MG-345 Bronza. The vessel was also equipped with two PK-16 and two PK-10 decoy-dispenser system which used chaff as a form of missile defense.

== Construction and career ==
The frigate was the fifth ship of the class. The keel was laid on 2 April 1987 with yard number 205 at the Zaliv Shipyard in Kerch. The ship was launched on 28 March 1988. The frigate was commissioned on 30 December 1988 as Imeni 70-letiya Pogranvoysk (Russian: Named after 70th anniversary of the Border Troops).

The ship was assigned to the 2nd Brigade of Border Patrol Ships, 1st Red Banner Division of Border Patrol Ships in Petropavlovsk-Kamchatsky, part of the Northeastern Border District. From 29 June to 16 August 1989, Imeni 70-letiya Pogranvoysk sailed from Sevastopol to its assigned homeport in Petropavlovsk-Kamchatsky via Suez Canal.

Upon the dissolution of the Soviet Union in December 1991, the ship was retained by Russia and the Maritime Border Forces of the Russian Federation inherited it. The frigate was renamed to Anadyr in 1995.

She was decommissioned on 24 April 2002. Anadyr was stricken from the coast guard in 2003 and was sent to China for scrapping, although according to Jane's Fighting Ships 2015-2016, the ship was extant and non-operational as of 2015.
