= Soviet frigate Doblestnyy =

Krivak-class frigate

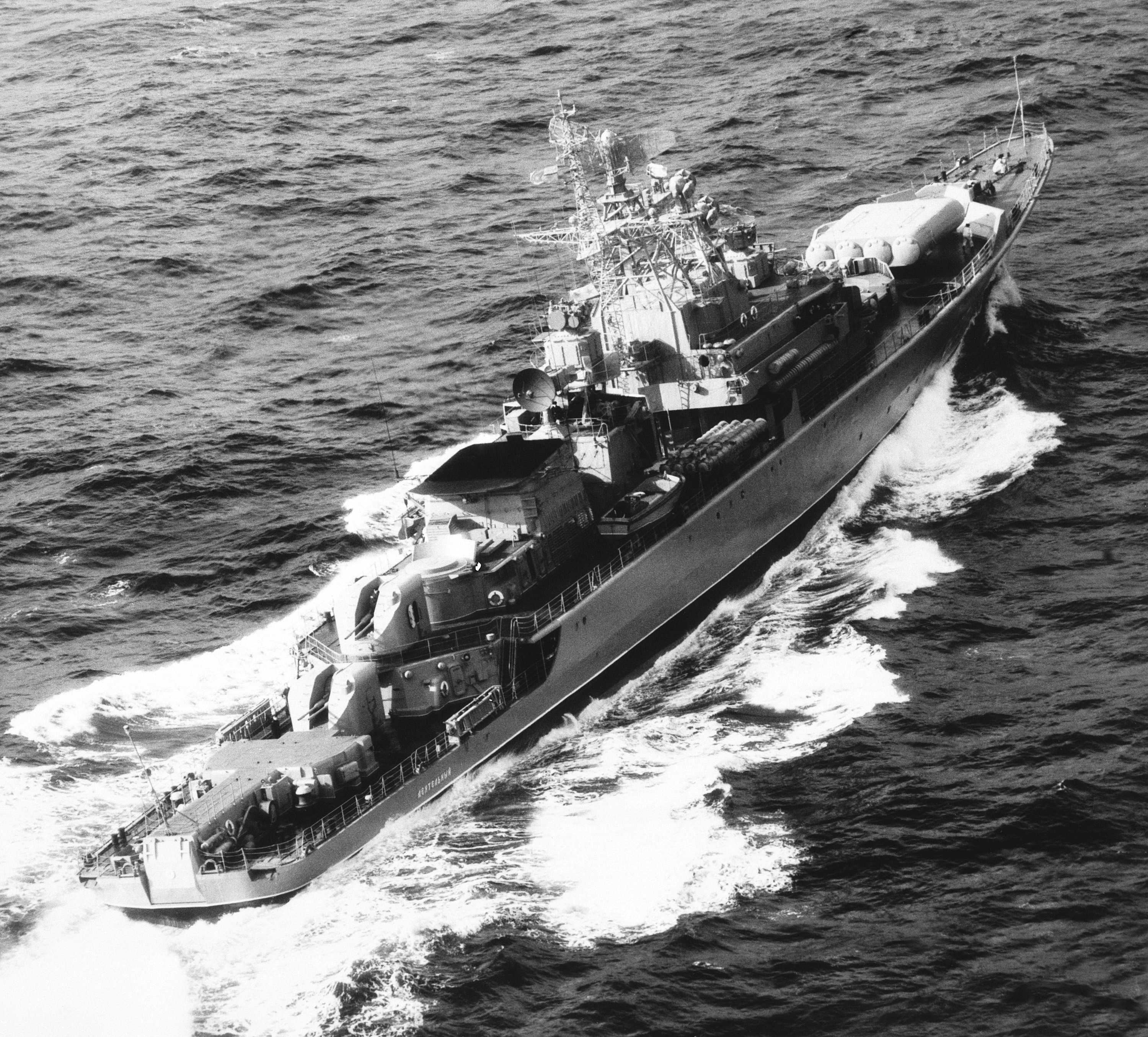
- Sister ship Deyatelnyy in 1985

History

Soviet Union
- Name: Doblestnyy
- Namesake: Russian for Valiant
- Builder: Zalyv Shipbuilding yard, Kerch
- Yard number: 12
- Laid down: 30 November 1970
- Launched: 22 February 1973
- Commissioned: 28 December 1973
- Decommissioned: 3 July 1992
- Fate: Sold to be broken up 18 July 1995

General characteristics
- Class & type: Project 1135 Burevestnik frigate
- Displacement: 2,810 tonnes (2,770 long tons; 3,100 short tons) standard, 3,200 tonnes (3,100 long tons; 3,500 short tons) full load
- Length: 123 m (404 ft)
- Beam: 14.2 m (47 ft)
- Draft: 4.5 m (15 ft)
- Installed power: 48,000 shp (36,000 kW)
- Propulsion: 4 gas turbines; COGAG; 2 shafts
- Speed: 32 knots (59 km/h)
- Range: 4,000 nmi (7,408 km) at 14 kn (26 km/h)
- Complement: 197, including 23 officers
- Sensors & processing systems: MR-310A Angara-A air/surface search radar; Volga and Don navigational radars; MG-332 Titan-2, MG-325 Vega, 2 MG-7 Braslet and MGS-400K sonars
- Electronic warfare & decoys: PK-16 ship-borne decoy dispenser system
- Armament: 4× URPK-3 Metel (SS-N-14 'Silex') anti-submarine missiles (1x4); 4× ZIF-122 4K33 launchers (2×2) with 40 4K33 OSA-M (SA-N-4'Gecko') surface to air missiles; 4× 76 mm (3 in) AK-726 guns (2×2); 2× RBU-6000 Smerch-2 Anti-Submarine rockets; 8× 533 mm (21 in) torpedo tubes (2x4); 18 mines

Doblestnyy (Russian: Доблестный, "Valiant") was a Project 1135 Burevestnik-class Large Anti-Submarine Ship (Большой Противолодочный Корабль, BPK) or Krivak-class frigate. With an armament centred on four Metel (NATO reporting name SS-N-14 'Silex') missiles, the ship was launched on 22 February 1973 and joined the Northern Fleet of the Soviet Navy as a dedicated anti-submarine vessel. Doblestnyy was designated a Guard Ship (Сторожевой Корабль, SKR) from 28 July 1977 in response to a change in emphasis of the navy, and subsequently undertook visits to a number of African nations, including Angola and Ghana. Taken out of service to be repaired and upgraded on 19 June 1991, a lack of funding meant that this was cancelled and instead the vessel was decommissioned. The vessel was sold to be broken up on 18 July 1995.

== Design and development ==
Doblestnyy was the fifth Project 1135 Burevestnik (Russian: Буревестник, "Petrel") Large Anti-Submarine Ship (Большой Противолодочный Корабль, BPK) laid down and the sixth one launched. Project 1135 was envisaged by the Soviet Navy as a less expensive complement to the Project 1134A Berkut A (NATO reporting name 'Kresta II') and Project 1134B Berkut B (NATO reporting name 'Kara') classes of anti-submarine warfare ships, designated Large Anti-Submarine Ship (Большой Противолодочный Корабль, BPK). The design was originally given to the TsKB-340 design bureau of Zelenodolsk, which had created the earlier Project 159 (NATO reporting name 'Petya') and Project 35 (NATO reporting name 'Mirka') classes.

However, the expansion in the United States Navy ballistic missile submarine fleet and the introduction of longer-ranged and more accurate submarine-launched ballistic missiles led to a review of the project to deal with this new threat. The work was transferred to TsKB-53, a design bureau in Leningrad that produced a substantially larger and more capable design. Created by N. P. Sobolov, Project 1135 combined a powerful missile armament with good seakeeping for a blue water role and shared the same BPK designation as the larger ships. This was amended to Guard Ship (Сторожевой Корабль, SKR) from 28 July 1977 to reflect the change in Soviet strategy of creating protected areas for friendly submarines close to the coast. NATO forces called the new class 'Krivak' class frigates.

Displacing 2,810 tonnes (2,770 long tons; 3,100 short tons) standard and 3,200 t (3,100 long tons; 3,500 short tons) full load, Doblestnyy was 123 m (404 ft) long overall, with a beam of 14.2 m (46 ft 7 in) and a draught of 4.5 m (14 ft 9 in). Power was provided by two 24,000 shp (18,000 kW) M7 power sets, each a combination of a 18,000-shaft-horsepower (13,000 kW) DK59 and a 6,000 shp (4,500 kW) M62 gas turbine linked in a COGAG arrangement and driving one fixed-pitch propeller. Each set was capable of a maximum of 24,000 shp (18,000 kW). Design speed was 32 knots (59 km/h; 37 mph) and range was 3,950 nautical miles (7,315 km; 4,546 mi) at 14 knots (26 km/h; 16 mph). The ship's complement was 192, including 23 officers.

The ship had a primary mission of anti-submarine warfare for which it was equipped with four URPK-3 Metel missiles (NATO reporting name SS-N-14 Silex), two quadruple torpedo tube mounts for 533 mm (21 in) torpedoes and a pair of 213 mm (8 in) RBU-6000 Smerch-2 anti-submarine rocket launchers. Defence against aircraft was provided by forty 4K33 OSA-M (SA-N-4 'Gecko') surface-to-air missiles which were launched from two sets of ZIF-122 launchers, each capable of launching two missiles. Two twin 76 mm (3 in) AK-726 guns were mounted aft and two single mounts for 45 mm (2 in) 21-KM guns were carried on the superstructure. Provision was made for carrying 18 mines.

Doblestnyy had a well-equipped sensor suite, including a single MR-310A Angara-A air/surface search radar, Volga and Don-2 navigation radars, MP-401S Start-S ESM radar system and Spectrum-F laser warning system. An extensive sonar complex was fitted, including MG-332 Titan-2, which was mounted in a bow radome, and MG-325 Vega. The latter was a towed-array sonar specifically developed for the class and had a range of up to 15 km (9.3 mi; 8.1 nmi). The ship was also equipped with the PK-16 decoy-dispenser system.

== Construction and career ==
Doblestnyy was laid down by Zalyv Shipbuilding yard in Kerch on 30 November 1970, and was given the yard number 12. The vessel was named for a Russian word that can be translated valorous or valiant. Launched on 22 February 1973 and commissioned on 28 December that year, the ship was deployed to the Northern Fleet on 17 February 1973. To that end, Doblestnyy left Sevastopol and sailed to Severomorsk arriving during June 1974. The vessel became part of the 10th Anti-Submarine Brigade, transferring to the 130th Brigade in December 1982. During this period, the ship served mainly in the region of the Arctic Ocean.

The warship took part in international operations, which increasingly demonstrated the Soviet ability to operate as a blue-water navy. On 11 May 1985, the vessel undertook operations outside the Arctic Ocean, initially in the Mediterranean Sea and then to Accra, Ghana, arriving on 2 June for a week. The ship returned to Africa between 1989 and 1990 to serve as part of the Soviet support for the MPLA in the Angolan Civil War. On 19 June 1991, the ship was removed from service and sent to be repaired. A lack of funding meant that this was cancelled and, on 3 July 1992, Doblestnyy was the first in the class to be decommissioned. The ship was disarmed and sold on 18 July 1995 to a firm in the United States to be broken up.
