= Soviet frigate Gordelivy =

Krivak-class frigate

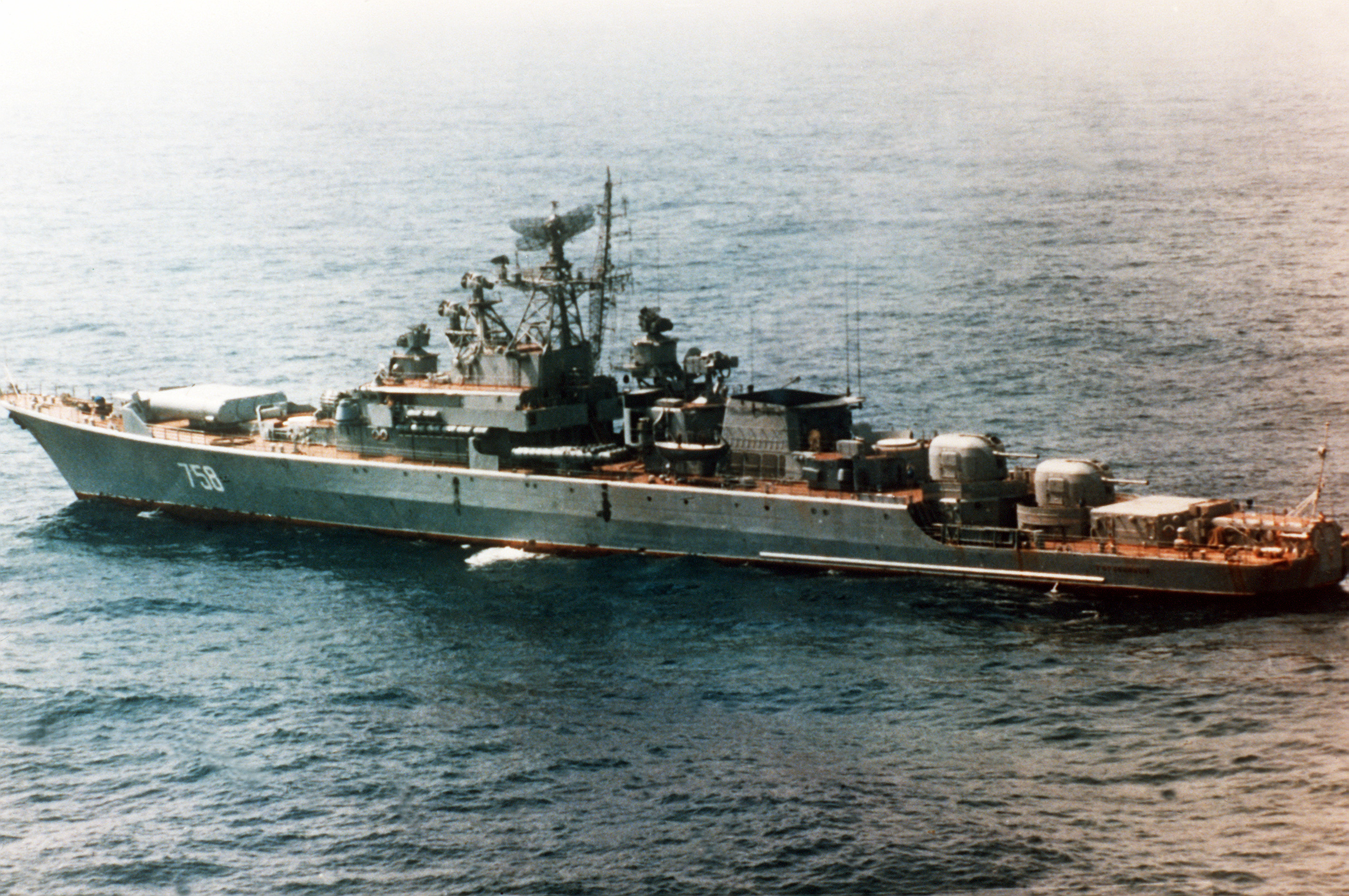
- Gordelivyy underway on 1 August 1988.

History

Soviet Union
- Name: Gordelivy
- Namesake: Russian for Proud
- Builder: Yantar shipyard, Kaliningrad
- Yard number: 166
- Laid down: 26 July 1977
- Launched: 3 May 1978
- Commissioned: 20 September 1979
- Decommissioned: 5 July 1994
- Fate: Sold to be broken up

General characteristics
- Class & type: Project 1135M Burevestnik frigate
- Displacement: 2,935 t (2,889 long tons; 3,235 short tons) (standard); 3,305 t (3,253 long tons; 3,643 short tons) (full load)
- Length: 123 m (403 ft 7 in)
- Draft: 4.5 m (14 ft 9 in)
- Installed power: 44,000 shp (33,000 kW)
- Propulsion: 4 gas turbines; COGAG; 2 shafts
- Speed: 32 kn (59 km/h)
- Range: 3,900 nmi (7,223 km) at 14 kn (26 km/h)
- Complement: 23 officers, 171 ratings
- Sensors & processing systems: MR-310A Angara-A air/surface search radar; Don navigational radar; MR-143 Lev-214 fire control radar; MG-332T Titan-2T, MG-325 Vega, 2 MG-7 Braslet and MGS-400K sonars
- Electronic warfare & decoys: PK-16 decoy-dispenser system
- Armament: 4 × URPK-5 Rastrub (SS-N-14 'Silex') anti-submarine and anti-shipping missiles (1×4); 4 × ZIF-122 4K33 launchers (2×2) with 40 4K33 OSA-M (SA-N-4'Gecko') surface to air missiles; 2 × 100 mm (4 in) AK-100 guns (2×1); 2 × RBU-6000 Smerch-2 anti-submarine rockets; 8 × 533 mm (21 in) torpedo tubes (2×4)

Gordelivy (Russian: Горделивый, "Proud") was a Project 1135M Burevestnik-class (Russian: Буревестник, "Petrel") Guard Ship (Сторожевой Корабль, SKR) or 'Krivak II'-class frigate that served with the Soviet and Russian Navies. Launched on 3 May 1978, the vessel operated as part of the Pacific Fleet as an anti-submarine vessel, with an armament built around the Metel Anti-Ship Complex. Gordelivy operated in the Indian and Pacific Oceans. The ship was involved in the recovery of a BOR-4 prototype spaceplane in 1982 and undertook a friendly visit to Mumbai, India, in 1985. Decommissioned and sold to a South Korean company in 1994, Gordelivy left Russia on 27 June 1995 to be broken up.

== Design and development ==
Gordelivy was one of eleven Project 1135M ships launched between 1975 and 1981. Project 1135, the Burevestnik (Russian: Буревестник, "Petrel") class, was envisaged by the Soviet Navy as a less expensive complement to the Project 1134A Berkut A (NATO reporting name 'Kresta II') and Project 1134B Berkut B (NATO reporting name 'Kara') classes of anti-submarine ships. Project 1135M was an improvement developed in 1972 with slightly increased displacement and heavier guns compared with the basic 1135. The design, by N. P. Sobolov, combined a powerful missile armament with good seakeeping for a blue water role. The ships were designated Guard Ship (Сторожевой Корабль, SKR) to reflect the Soviet strategy of creating protected areas for friendly submarines close to the coast and the substantially greater anti-ship capability compared to the earlier members of the class. NATO forces called the vessels 'Krivak II'-class frigates.

Displacing 2,935 tonnes (2,889 long tons; 3,235 short tons) standard and 3,305 t (3,253 long tons; 3,643 short tons) full load, Gordelivy was 123 m (403 ft 7 in) long overall, with a beam of 14.2 m (46 ft 7 in) and a draught of 4.5 m (14 ft 9 in). Power was provided by two M7K power sets, each consisting of a combination of a 17,000-shaft-horsepower (13,000 kW) DK59 and a 5,000 shp (3,700 kW) M62 gas turbine arranged in a COGAG installation and driving one fixed-pitch propeller. Each set was capable of a maximum of 22,000 shp (16,000 kW). Design speed was 32 knots (59 km/h; 37 mph) and range 3,900 nautical miles (7,223 km; 4,488 mi) at 14 kn (26 km/h; 16 mph). The ship's complement was 194, including 23 officers.

=== Armament and sensors ===
Gordelivy was designed for anti-submarine warfare around four URPK-5 Rastrub missiles (NATO reporting name SS-N-14 'Silex'), backed up by a pair of quadruple launchers for 533 mm (21 in) torpedoes and a pair of RBU-6000 213 mm (8 in) Smerch-2 anti-submarine rocket launchers. Both the URPK-5 and the torpedoes also had secondary anti-ship capabilities. Defence against aircraft was provided by forty 4K33 OSA-M (SA-N-4 'Gecko') surface to air missiles which were launched from two sets of ZIF-122 launchers, each capable of launching two missiles. Two 100 mm (4 in) AK-100 guns were mounted aft.

The ship had a well-equipped sensor suite, including a single MR-310A Angara-A air/surface search radar, Don navigation radar, the MP-401S Start-S ESM radar system and the Spectrum-F laser warning system. Fire control for the guns consisted of a MR-143 Lev-214 radar. An extensive sonar complex was fitted, including MG-332T Titan-2T, which was mounted in a bow radome, and MG-325 Vega. The latter was a towed-array sonar specifically developed for the class and had a range of up to 15 kilometres (9.3 mi). The vessel was also equipped with the PK-16 decoy-dispenser system which used chaff as a form of missile defense.

== Construction and career ==
Laid down by on 26 July 1977 with the yard number 166 at the Yantar Shipyard in Kaliningrad, Gordelivy was launched on 3 May 1977. The ship was the eighth of the class built at the yard. The ship was named for a Russian word that can be translated as proud. The vessel was commissioned on 20 September and was initially based at Baltiysk. However, the Soviet Union was extending its Asian presence, and expanding the Pacific Fleet with large combat vessels of comparable capability to the European fleets. Therefore Gordelivy was allocated to the Pacific Fleet and set off from the Baltic Sea for Vladivostok in 1979.

Once in service, Gordelivy operated in the Indian and Pacific Oceans, operating as far as the Arabian Peninsula. On 4 June 1982, the vessel was part of the flotilla that recovered one of the BOR-4 prototype spaceplanes. However, the main role that the vessel was to perform was to undertake good will visits to Asian countries that were friendly to the Soviet Union. For example, the ship visited Mumbai, India, between 1 and 5 June 1985.

With the dissolution of the Soviet Union on 26 December 1991, Gordelivy was transferred to the Russian Navy. On 5 July 1994, due to wear and tear, and a lack of funds to pay for the necessary repairs, Gordelivy was decommissioned and sent back to Vladivostok. On 6 October, the ship was sold to a South Korean firm and then was towed away on 27 June the following year to be broken up.
