= Soviet frigate Dostoynyy =

Soviet frigate

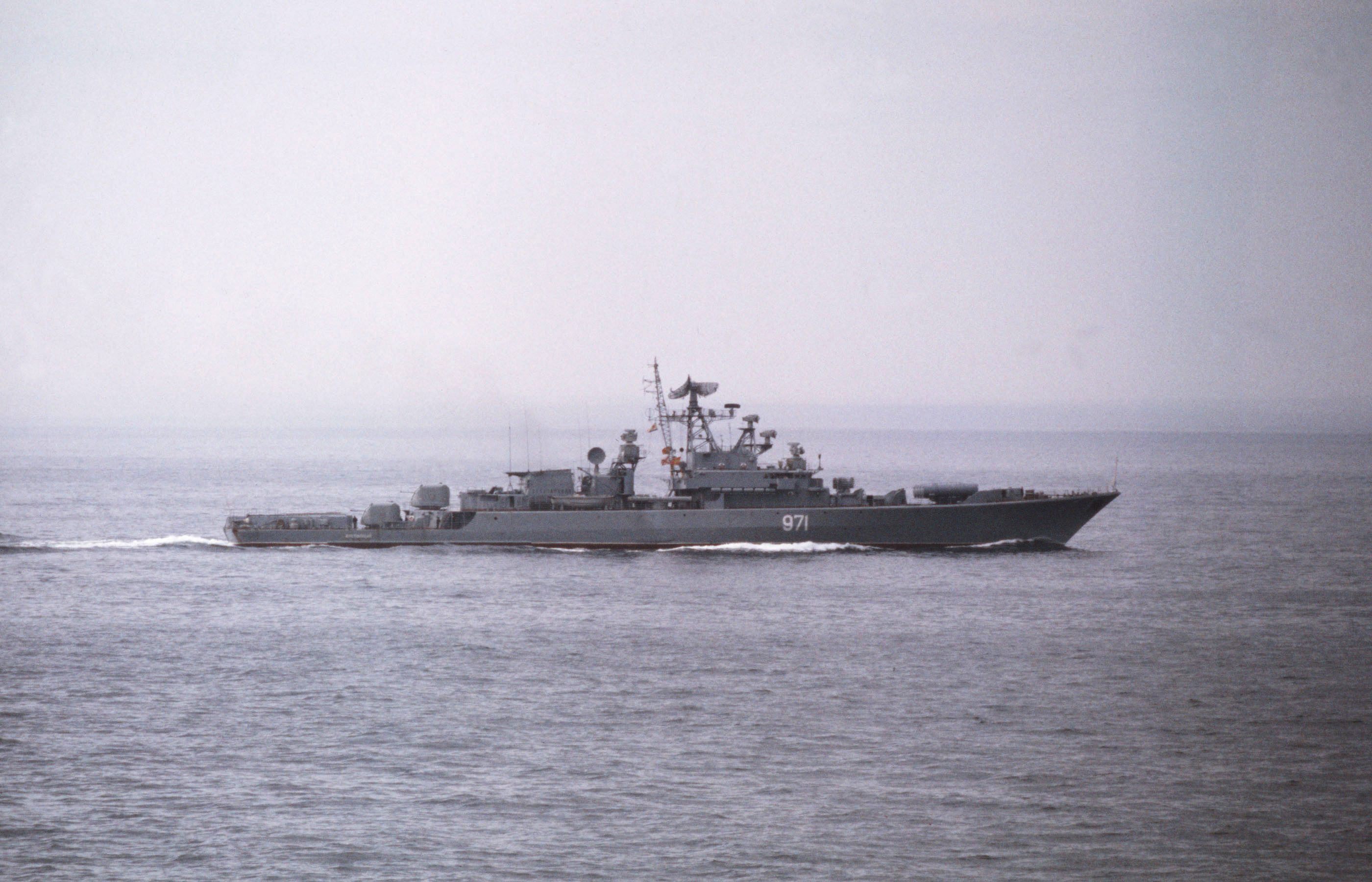
- Dostoynyy in 1983.

History

Soviet Union
- Name: Dostoynyy
- Namesake: Russian for virtuous
- Builder: Zalyv Shipbuilding yard, Kerch
- Yard number: 11
- Laid down: 11 August 1969
- Launched: 8 May 1971
- Commissioned: 31 December 1971
- Decommissioned: 30 June 1993
- Fate: Scrapped

General characteristics
- Class & type: Project 1135 Burevestnik frigate
- Displacement: 2,835 tonnes (2,790 long tons; 3,125 short tons) standard, 3,190 tonnes (3,140 long tons; 3,520 short tons) full load
- Length: 123 m (404 ft)
- Beam: 14.2 m (47 ft)
- Draft: 4.5 m (15 ft)
- Propulsion: 2 shaft; COGAG; 2x M-3 gas-turbines, 36,000 shp; 2x M-60 gas-turbines (cruise), 12,000 shp
- Speed: 32 knots (59 km/h)
- Range: 3,515 nmi (6,510 km) at 18 knots (33 km/h)
- Complement: 192, including 23 officers
- Sensors & processing systems: MR-310A Angara-A air/surface search radar, Volga navigation radar, Don navigation radar, MG-332 Titan-2, MG-325 Vega, 2 MG-7 Braslet and MGS-409K sonars
- Electronic warfare & decoys: PK-16 ship-borne decoy dispenser system
- Armament: 4× URPK-4 Metel (SS-N-14 'Silex') anti-submarine missiles (1x4); 4× ZIF-122 4K33 launchers (22) with 40 4K33 OSA-M (SA-N-4'Gecko') surface to air missiles; 4× 76 mm (3 in) AK-726 guns (2×2); 2× RBU-6000 Smerch-2 Anti-Submarine rockets; 8× 533 mm (21 in) torpedo tubes (2x4); 18 mines

Dostoynyy (Russian: Достойный, "Virtuous") was a Project 1135 Burevestnik-class Large Anti-Submarine Ship (Большой Противолодочный Корабль, BPK) or Krivak-class frigate. With an armament based around the Metel anti-submarine missile system, the vessel was commissioned on 31 December 1971 into the Northern Fleet of the Soviet Navy. The vessel took part in a number of exercises, including Okean-75, Sever-77 and Eskadra-84 and as far away as the Mediterranean Sea as part of the Soviet demonstration of their Naval reach. The ship was designated a Guard Ship (Сторожевой Корабль, SKR) from 28 July 1977 in response to a change in emphasis of the navy, and was upgraded between January 1985 and August 1988 with missiles that added anti-ship capability. After more than twenty years service, the ship was decommissioned on 30 June 1993.

== Design ==
Designed by N.P. Sobolov, Dostoynyy was the fifth Project 1135 Large Anti-Submarine Ship (Большой Противолодочный Корабль, BPK) laid down and the fourth one launched. The vessel is named for a Russian word which can be translated deserving, virtuous or worthy. Dostoynyy served with the Soviet Navy, and the Russian Navy after the dissolution of the Soviet Union, as an anti-submarine frigate. The ship was redesignated a Guard Ship (Сторожевой Корабль, SKR) from 28 July 1977 to reflect the change in Soviet strategy of creating protected areas for friendly submarines close to the coast.

Dostoynyy displaced 2,835 tonnes (2,790 long tons; 3,125 short tons) standard and 3,190 tonnes (3,140 long tons; 3,520 short tons) full load. Length overall was 123 m (404 ft), with a beam of 14.2 m (46 ft 7 in) and a draught of 4.5 m (14 ft 9 in). Power was provided by a combination of two 18,000 horsepower (13,000 kW) M3 and two 6,000 horsepower (4,500 kW) M60 gas turbines installed as a COGAG set named М7, which enabled the ship to achieve a design speed of 32 knots (59 km/h). Range was 4,000 nmi (7,408 km) at 14 knots (26 km/h), 3,515 nmi (6,510 km) at 18 knots (33 km/h), 3,155 nmi (5,843 km) at 24 knots (44 km/h) and 1,240 nmi (2,296 km) at 32 knots (59 km/h). The ship's complement was 192, including 23 officers.

The ship was designed for anti-submarine warfare around four URPK-3 Metel missiles (NATO reporting name SS-N-14 Silex), backed up by a pair of quadruple 533 millimetres (21.0 in) torpedoes and a pair of RBU-6000 213 mm (8 in) Smerch-2 anti-submarine rocket launchers. The main armament was upgraded to URPK-5 Rastrub (SS-N-14B) between 1985 and 1986, which provided a much increased anti-ship capability. Defence against aircraft was provided by forty 4K33 OSA-M (SA-N-4 Gecko) surface to air missiles which were launched from four ZIF-122 launchers. Two twin 76 mm (3 in) AK-726 guns were mounted aft. Mines were also carried, either eighteen IGDM-500 KSM, fourteen KAM, fourteen KB Krab, ten Serpey, four PMR-1, seven PMR-2, seven MTPK-1, fourteen RM-1 mines or twelve UDM-2.

The ship had a well-equipped sensor suite, including a single MR-310A Angara-A air/surface search radar, Volga navigation radar, Don navigation radar, MP-401S Start-S ESM radar system, Nickel-KM and Khrom-KM IFF and ARP-50R radio direction finder. An extensive sonar complement was fitted, including MG-332 Titan-2, MG-325 Vega and MGS-400K, along with two MG-7 Braslet anti-saboteur sonars and the MG-26 Hosta underwater communication system.

== Service ==
Dostoynyy was laid down by Zalyv Shipbuilding yard in Kerch on 11 August 1969, the first of the class to be constructed by the shipbuilder, and was given the yard number 11. Launched on 8 May 1971 and commissioned on 31 December, the ship was deployed to the Northern Fleet on 28 April 1972. To that end, on 18 July, Dostoynyy left Sevastopol and travelled through the Mediterranean Sea, taking part in operations there, and sailed to Severomorsk, arriving on 30 August. The vessel became part of the 10th Anti-Submarine Brigade and served on the edge of the Arctic Ocean. Dostoynyy took part in a number of exercises, including Okean-75 between 11 and 22 April 1975, Sever-77, Okean-83, Magistral-83 and, between 19 and 24 May 1984, Eskadra-84. The operations increasingly demonstrated the Soviet ability to operate as a blue-water navy. In January 1985, the ship was taken out of service and retired to Murmansk for repairs. After being upgraded with URPK-5 (SS-N-14B) missiles, the vessel returned to service in August 1988. Still with the Northern Fleet, the ship returned to the Mediterranean Sea between May and December 1989. Decommissioned on 30 June 1993, Dostoynyy was scrapped between 1994 and 1995.

== Selected Pennant numbers ==
Pennant number	Date
550	1973
557	1975
542	1976
255	1976
503	1979
971	1983
976	
944	1989
978	1990
