= Russian frigate Menzhinskiy =

Krivak-class frigate

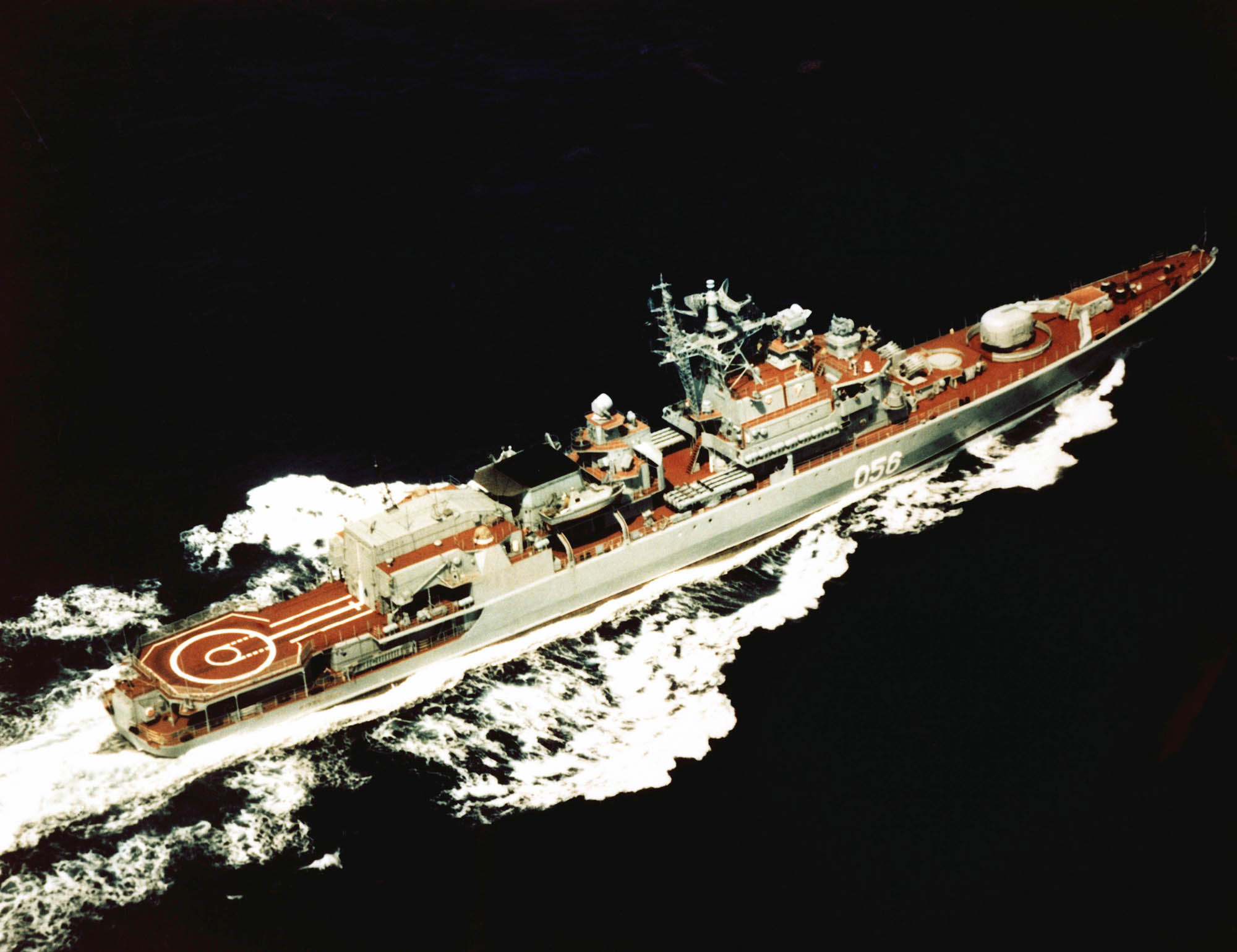
- Menzhinskiy underway on 1 August 1985

History

→ Soviet Union → Russia
- Name: Menzhinskiy
- Namesake: Vyacheslav Menzhinsky
- Builder: Zaliv Shipyard, Kerch
- Yard number: 201
- Laid down: 14 August 1981
- Launched: 31 December 1982
- Commissioned: 29 December 1983
- Decommissioned: 1998
- Stricken: 2000
- Status: Retired

General characteristics
- Class & type: Project 11351 Nerey frigate
- Displacement: 3,070 t (3,020 long tons) (standard); 3,545 t (3,489 long tons) (full)
- Length: 123 m (403 ft 7 in)
- Beam: 14.2 m (46 ft 7 in)
- Draught: 4.72 m (15 ft 6 in)
- Installed power: 63,000 shp (47,000 kW)
- Propulsion: 4 gas turbines; COGAG; 2 shafts
- Speed: 32 kn (59 km/h)
- Range: 3,900 nmi (7,223 km) at 14 kn (26 km/h)
- Complement: 192
- Sensors & processing systems: MR-310A Angara-A air/surface search radar; Vaigach-Nayada navigational radar; MR-184 Lev fire control radar; Vympel-A fire control radar; MGK-335S Platina-S sonar; MG-345 Bronza towed sonar
- Electronic warfare & decoys: MP-401 Start ESM; PK-16 and PK-10 chaff launchers
- Armament: 2 × ZIF-122 4K33 launchers (1×2) with 20 4K33 OSA-M (SA-N-4'Gecko') SAMs (1×2); 1 × 100 mm (4 in) AK-100 gun; 2 × 30 mm (1 in) AK-630M CIWS; 2 × RBU-6000 Smerch-2 anti-submarine rockets; 8 × 533 mm (21 in) torpedo tubes (2×4); 16 × naval mines
- Aircraft carried: 1 × Kamov Ka-27PS
- Aviation facilities: Helipad and hangar

Menzhinskiy (also transliterated Menzhinsky, Russian: Менжинский) was the lead ship of Project 11351 Nerey-class frigate (NATO reporting name Krivak III) of the Soviet Border Troops and later the Coast Guard of the Federal Security Service of Russia.

== Design and description ==
Menzhinskiy was one of nine Project 11351 ships launched between 1982 and 1992. Project 11351, the Nerey (Russian: Нерей, "Nereus") class, was the patrol version of the Project 1135 Burevestnik for the Soviet Maritime Border Troops. The ships were designated Border Patrol Ship (пограничный сторожевой корабль, PSKR) to reflect their role as patrol ships of the Border Troops. In comparison to other members of the class, Project 11351 ships has a helipad and hangar for a Kamov Ka-27PS search-and-rescue helicopter astern, in exchange to losing one 100 mm gun, one twin-arm surface-to-air missile launcher and the URPK-5 Rastrub (SS-N-14 'Silex') anti-ship missile launchers. NATO classified the vessels as 'Krivak III'-class frigates.

Menzhinskiy was 123 m (403 ft 7 in) long overall, with a beam of 14.2 m (46 ft 7 in) and a draught of 4.72 m (15 ft 6 in). Displacing 3,070 t (3,020 long tons) standard and 3,545 t (3,489 long tons) full load, the ship's power were provided by two 22,500 shp (16,800 kW) DT59 and two 9,000 shp (6,700 kW) DS71 gas turbines arranged in a COGAG installation, driving two fixed-pitch propellers. Design speed was 32 knots (59 km/h; 37 mph) and range 3,900 nautical miles (7,223 km; 4,488 mi) at 14 kn (26 km/h; 16 mph). The ship's complement was 192, including 31 officers.

=== Armament and sensors ===
Menzhinskiy was armed with one 100 mm (4 in) AK-100 gun mounted forward of the bridge and two AK-630M close-in weapon system autocannons mounted on each side of the helicopter hangar. Defence against aircraft was provided by twenty 4K33 OSA-M (SA-N-4 'Gecko') surface-to-air missiles which were launched from one set of twin-arm ZIF-122 launchers, mounted aft of the fore 100 mm gun. For anti-submarine warfare, the ship were equipped with a pair of RBU-6000 213 mm (8 in) Smerch-2 12-barrel anti-submarine rocket launchers and a pair of PTA-53-1135 quadruple launchers for 533 mm (21 in) torpedoes, consisted of either 53-65K wake homing torpedo or SET-65 anti-submarine homing torpedo. The ship can also carry 16 naval mines.

The ship sensor suites includes Sapfir-U7 combat management system, one Vaigach-Nayada navigation radar, and the MP-401 Start Electronic Support Measures (ESM) system. As with other Project 11351 ships, Menzhinskiy was supposed to be equipped with the more advanced MR-760 Fregat-MA air/surface radar, but due to delays the ship's radar was substituted with MR-310A Angara-A instead. Fire control for the guns consisted of MR-184 Lev radar for the 100 mm gun and Vympel-A radar for the 30 mm autocannons. An extensive sonar complex was fitted, including the bow-mounted MGK-335S Platina-S and the towed-array MG-345 Bronza. The vessel was also equipped with two PK-16 and two PK-10 decoy-dispenser system, which used chaff as a form of missile defense.

== Construction and career ==
The frigate was the first ship of the class. The keel was laid on 14 August 1981 with yard number 201 at the Zaliv Shipyard in Kerch. The ship was launched on 31 December 1982. Menzhinskiy was commissioned to KGB Border Troops Naval Service on 29 December 1983.

The ship was assigned to the 16th Sakhalinskaya Red Banner Separate Brigade of Border Patrol Ships in Nakhodka, part of the Pacific Border District. From 6 September to 22 October 1984, Menzhinskiy sailed from Sevastopol to its assigned homeport in Nakhodka via Suez Canal.

Menzhinskiy was decommissioned in 1998 and was stricken from the coast guard in 2000. According to Jane's Fighting Ships 2015-2016, the ship was extant and non-operational as of 2015.
