= Soviet frigate Poryvistyy =

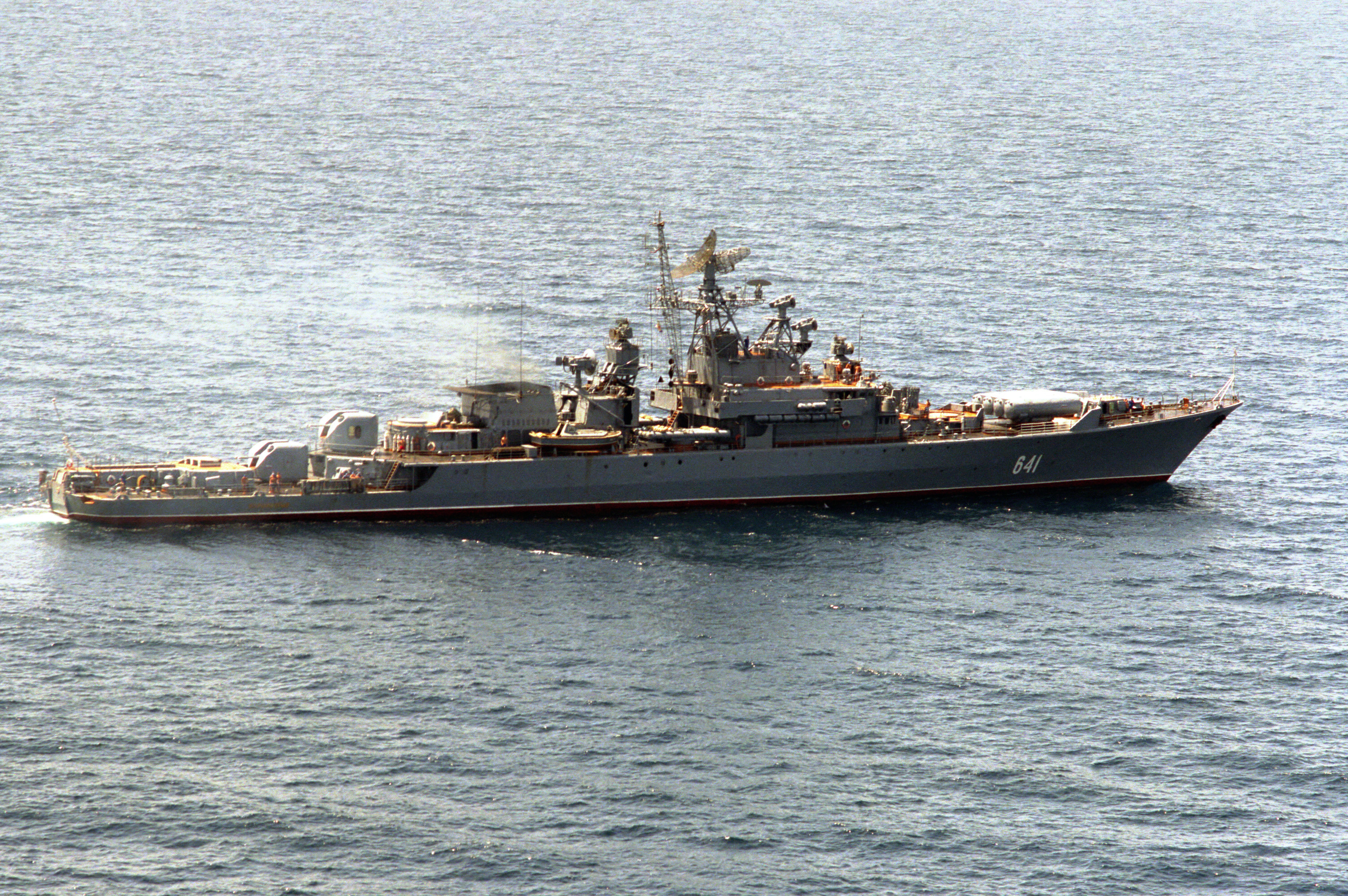
- Poryvistyy on 20 March 1987.

History

Soviet Union
- Name: Poryvistyy
- Namesake: Russian for Impetuous
- Builder: Zalyv Shipbuilding yard, Kerch
- Yard number: 17
- Laid down: 21 May 1980
- Launched: 16 May 1981
- Commissioned: 29 December 1981
- Decommissioned: 5 June 1994
- Fate: Sold 25 November 1994 to become a museum ship

General characteristics
- Class & type: Project 1135 Burevestnik frigate
- Displacement: 2,835 tonnes (2,790 long tons; 3,125 short tons) standard, 3,190 tonnes (3,140 long tons; 3,520 short tons) full load
- Length: 123 m (404 ft)
- Beam: 142 m (466 ft)
- Draft: 4.5 m (15 ft)
- Propulsion: 2 shaft; COGAG; 2x M-3 gas-turbines, 36,000 shp; 2x M-60 gas-turbines (cruise), 12,000 shp
- Speed: 32 knots (59 km/h)
- Range: 3,515 nmi (6,510 km) at 18 knots (33 km/h)
- Complement: 192, including 23 officers
- Sensors & processing systems: MR-310A Angara-A air/surface search radar, Volga navigation radar, Don navigation radar, MG-332 Titan-2, MG-325 Vega, 2 MG-7 Braslet and MGS-400K sonars
- Electronic warfare & decoys: PK-16 ship-borne decoy dispenser system
- Armament: 4× URPK-5 Rastrub-B (SS-N-14B 'Silex') anti-submarine and anti-shipping missiles (1×4); 4× ZIF-122 4K33 launchers (2×2) with 40 4K33 OSA-MA (SA-N-4'Gecko') surface to air missiles; 4× 76 mm (3 in) AK-726 guns (2×2); 2× RBU-6000 Smerch-2 Anti-Submarine rockets; 8× 533 mm (21 in) torpedo tubes (2×4); 18 mines

Poryvistyy (Russian: Порывистый, "Impetuous") was a Project 1135 Burevestnik Guard Ship (Сторожевой Корабль, SKR) or Krivak-class frigate. Displacing 3,190 tonnes (3,140 long tons; 3,520 short tons) full load, the vessel was armed with the Rastrub-B anti-submarine and anti-shipping missile system. Launched on 16 May 1981, the vessel joined the Pacific Fleet of the Soviet Navy. Over the next decade, exercises with the aircraft carrier Novorossiysk and other members of the Soviet fleet took the ship to Hawaii to demonstrate the capacity of the country to field a blue water navy. Later, the escalating Iran–Iraq War led to the ship being transferred to escorting duties in the Persian Gulf. Between 1987 and 1988, Poryvistyy successfully accompanied 67 merchant ships to safety. After the dissolution of the Soviet Union in 1991, the ship was transferred to the Russian Navy, but, during the following year, was placed in reserve. Decommissioned on 5 June 1994, the ship was sold to a sea club named Vostok to serve as a museum ship. It served in this role until it was damaged by a fire in 1997.

== Design and development ==
Designed by N.P. Sobolov, Poryvistyy was the twenty-first and final Project 1135 Guard Ship (Сторожевой Корабль, SKR) launched. The vessel is named for a Russian word which can be translated impetuous. Poryvistyy served with the Soviet Navy, and the Russian Navy after the dissolution of the Soviet Union, as an anti-submarine frigate. The ship was designed to create safe areas for friendly ballistic missile submarines close to the coast.

Poryvistyy displaced 2,835 tonnes (2,790 long tons; 3,125 short tons) standard and 3,190 tonnes (3,140 long tons; 3,520 short tons) full load. Length overall was 123 metres (404 ft), with a beam of 14.2 m (46 ft 7 in) and a draught of 4.5 m (14 ft 9 in). Power was provided by a combination of two 18,000 shaft horsepower (13,000 kW) M3 and two 6,000 shp (4,500 kW) M60 gas turbines installed as a COGAG set named М7, which enabled the ship to achieve a design speed of 32 knots (59 km/h). Range was 4,000 nautical miles (7,408 km) at 14 knots (26 km/h), 3,515 nmi (6,510 km) at 18 knots (33 km/h), 3,155 nmi (5,843 km) at 24 knots (44 km/h) and 1,240 nmi (2,296 km) at 32 knots (59 km/h). The ship's complement was 192, including 23 officers.

The ship was designed around a main armament of four URPK-5 Rastrub B missiles (NATO reporting name SS-N-14B ‘’Silex’') mounted on the foredeck, which provided both anti-submarine and anti-shipping capability. The missiles were backed up by a pair of quadruple 533-millimetre (21.0 in) torpedo tubes and a pair of RBU-6000 213 mm (8 in) Smerch-2 anti-submarine rocket launchers. Defence against aircraft was provided by forty 4K33 OSA-MA (SA-N-4 Gecko) surface to air missiles which were launched from two twin ZIF-122 launchers, one mounted forward and the other aft. Two twin 76 mm (3 in) AK-726 guns were mounted aft. Mines were also carried, either eighteen IGDM-500 KSM, fourteen KAM, fourteen KB Krab, ten Serpey, four PMR-1, seven PMR-2, seven MTPK-1, fourteen RM-1 or twelve UDM-2.

The ship had a well-equipped sensor suite, including a single MR-310A Angara-A air/surface search radar, Volga navigation radar, Don navigation radar, MP-401S Start-S ESM radar system, Nickel-KM and Kremniyy IFF and ARP-50R radio direction finder. An extensive sonar complement was fitted, including MG-332 Titan-2, MG-325 Vega and MGS-400K, along with two MG-7 Braslet anti-saboteur sonars and the MG-26 Hosta underwater communication system. The ship was also fitted with the PK-16 ship-borne decoy dispenser system.

== Construction and career ==
Poryvistyy was laid down by Zalyv Shipbuilding yard in Kerch on 21 May 1980, the last of the class to be constructed by the shipbuilder, and was given the yard number 17. Launched on 16 May 1981 and commissioned on 29 December, having already been allocated to the Pacific Fleet on 9 February. To that end, on 17 October 1983, Poryvistyy left Sevastopol with the aircraft carrier Novorossiysk and sailed to Vladivostok, arriving on 28 February the following year. En route, the vessels called at Luanda, Angola, between 12 and 20 November, Maputo, Mozambique, between 1 and 9 December, Victoria, Seychelles, between 8 and 13 December and Madras, India, between 5 and 10 February. The vessel became part of the 173rd Brigade.

1985 saw Poryvistyy take part in a number of exercises in the Pacific Ocean with Novorossiysk. Between 25 March and 17 April, the two ships joined a large contingent of other major vessels including the Project 1134A Berkut A Vasily Chapayev and Project 1134B Berkut B Nikolayev, Tashkent and Tallinn for operational exercises near Hawaii. Soon afterwards, between 29 May and 16 June, the pair were again together in the Sea of Japan undertaking anti-submarine drills. Later that year, between 13 and 18 August, the vessel accompanied Tallinn on a diplomatic mission to North Korea. The breadth of these operations were designed to demonstrate the Soviet ability to operate as a blue-water navy.

On 6 May 1987, a Soviet tanker was attacked by gunboats of the Islamic Republic of Iran Navy, part of an escalation in the Iran–Iraq War that had been raging since 22 September 1980. The Soviet Union responded by sending a large naval force, including Poryvistyy, which had at the time just finished a visit to Colombo, Sri Lanka, to the Persian Gulf to escort merchant vessels. Operations continued into the following year, with a total of 67 merchant ships taken under the ship's umbrella and safely brought to port. The ship then returned to the Sea of Japan, revisiting North Korea between 14 and 18 August 1990.

With the dissolution of the Soviet Union on 26 December 1991, the ship was transferred to the Russian Navy. The vessel was deemed superfluous to requirements and, on 8 May 1992, was placed in reserve, being decommissioned two years later on 5 June 1994. However, the ship was still in a good condition and so was sold to a sea club named Vostok on 25 November. Poryvistyy served as a museum ship until being damaged by fire on 20 March 1997.

== Selected Pennant numbers ==
Pennant number	Date
859	1981
806	1984
628	1985
641	1985
626	1989
670	1990
618	1990
