= Krivak-class frigate =

Class of frigates built for Soviet/Russian navy

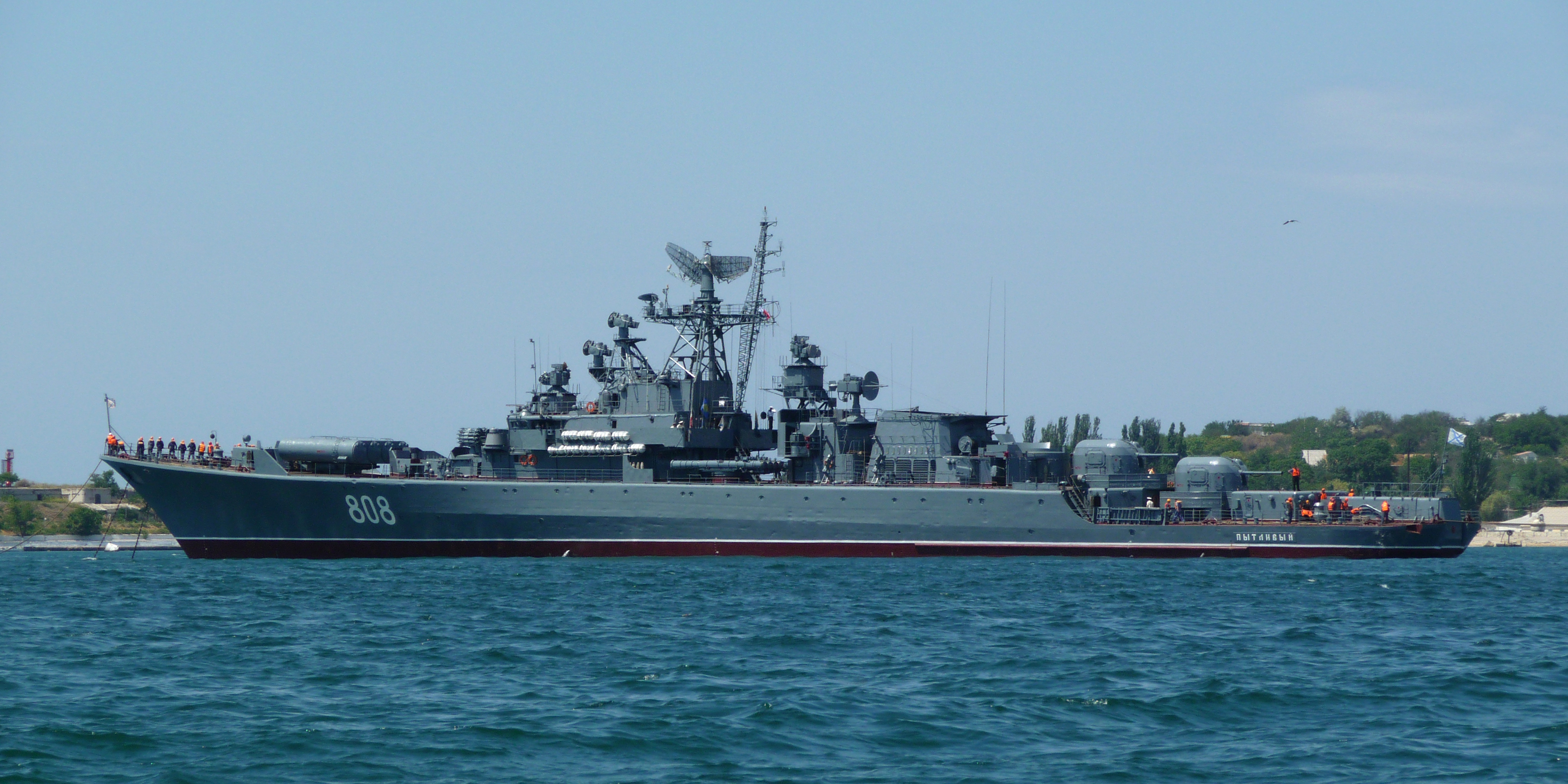
- A Krivak II-class frigate Pytlivyy in Sevastopol Bay, 2009.

Class overview
- Name: Krivak class (Project 1135)
- Builders: Yantar Shipyard; Zhdanov Shipyard; Baltic Shipyard; Zaliv Shipyard
- Operators: Soviet Navy; Soviet Border Troops; Russian Navy; Russian Coast Guard; Ukrainian Navy; Indian Navy; Korean People's Navy
- Preceded by: Riga class
- Succeeded by: Neustrashimy class; Admiral Gorshkov class
- Subclasses: Talwar class; Admiral Grigorovich class
- Planned: 57
- Building: 3 (2 x 11356, 1 x 11356R/M)
- Completed: 52 (37 × 1135, 1135M, 11352/11353, 4 × 11351, 5 x 11356R/M and 6 x 11356)
- Canceled: 2 (2 × 11351)
- Active: 5 active in Russia (1 × 1135, 1 × 1135M, 3 x 11356R/M) 8 x active in India (6 x 11356, 2 x 11356R/M)
- Laid up: 1 (Oryol)
- Lost: 1 (Hetman Sahaidachny)
- Retired: 37

General characteristics
- Type: Frigate / Patrol ship SKR (Russian classification)
- Displacement: Standard: 3,300 tons; Full: 3,575 tons
- Length: 405.3 ft (123.5 m)
- Beam: 46.3 ft (14.1 m)
- Draught: 15.1 ft (4.6 m)
- Propulsion: 2 shaft; COGAG; 2 × M-8k, 40,000 shp (30,000 kW) or DK59 13.5 MW or DT59 16.9 MW gas-turbines; 2 × M-62 7.4 MW or DS71 13.4 gas-turbines (cruise), 14,950 shp (11,150 kW)
- Speed: 32 knots (59 km/h)
- Range: 4,995 nmi (9,251 km) at 14 knots (26 km/h)
- Complement: 200
- Sensors & processing systems: Radar: 1 MR-755 Fregat-M/Half Plate air/surf search; Sonar: Zvezda-2 suite with MGK-345 Bronza/Ox Yoke bow mounted LF, Ox Tail LF VDS; Fire control: Purga ASW combat system, 2 Drakon/Eye Bowl SSM targeting, 2 MPZ-301 Baza/Pop Group
- Electronic warfare & decoys: Start suite with Bell Shroud intercept, Bell Squat jammer, 4 PK-16 decoy RL, 8 PK-10 decoy RL, 2 towed decoys
- Armament: 1 × 4 URK-5 (SS-N-14 'Silex') SSM/ASW missiles; 2 × Osa-MA SAM systems SA-N-4 'Gecko' SAM (40 missiles); 4 × 76 mm AK-726 guns (2×2) (Burevestnik M had 2×1 100 mm AK-100 guns); 2 × RBU-6000 anti-submarine rockets; 2 × 4 533 mm torpedo tubes
- Aircraft carried: Ka-27 on Krivak III only

The Krivak class, Soviet designation Project 1135 Burevestnik (storm petrel), are a series of frigates and patrol ships built in the Soviet Union primarily for the Soviet Navy since 1970. Later some sub-branches, like the Nerey (Nereus) were designed for coastal patrol by the KGB Border Troops. Until 1977, the ships in the class were considered to be large anti-submarine warfare vessels.

These ships are commonly known by their NATO reporting class name of Krivak and are divided into Krivak I, Krivak II, Krivak IV (navy), and Krivak III (coast guard) classes.

== History ==
The frigates were designed as a successor to the Riga class. The design started in the late 1950s and matured as an anti-submarine ship in the 1960s. The first ship was Bditelnyy that was commissioned in 1970.

A total of 40 ships were built, 32 ships for the Soviet Navy and 8 modified ships of the Nerey (Krivak III) subclass for the KGB Maritime Border Guard. As of 2021, 2 vessels of the Nerey subclass are in service with the FSB Coast Guard and one was the flagship of the Ukrainian Navy (scuttled in 2022 to avoid capture).

The ship's unique features — the bow missile box, the stack and the angled mast, earned it a rap-like nickname among U. S. sailors that comes from their foreign ship silhouette identification training — "Hot dog pack, Smokestack, Knife in the Back, two Guns in the Back — Krivak."

The Indian Navy ordered six frigates of upgraded Krivak III class as the Talwar class, designated as Project 11356. The first three ships were delivered in 2003–2004, followed by a second batch of three ships delivered in 2012–2013.

On 12 October 2010, it was announced that the Yantar Shipyard at Kaliningrad had won a contract for construction of three new warships for the Russian Navy. The construction of the frigates for the Russian Navy will be carried out in parallel with the construction of the same-type frigates for the Indian Navy.

== Variants ==
- Project 1135 Burevestnik (Krivak I): Design process started in 1956 as an anti-surface frigate successor to the Riga-class frigate. The role changed to an anti-submarine ship powered by gas turbines and armed with the SS-N-14 missile. The main building yards were Zhdanov Yard (now known as Northern Shipyard) (Leningrad), Yantar Yard (Kaliningrad) and Kamysh Burun Yard, (Kerch, Crimea). NATO referred to these ships as Krivak I-class. (21 ships built).
- Project 1135M Burevestnik M (Krivak II): This group of ships were fitted with two single 100 mm AK-100 rear gun turrets instead of the twin 76 mm AK-726 turrets of the Burevestnik design. They also had a redesigned Variable Depth Sonar (VDS) installation. All of these ships were built in Kaliningrad. NATO referred to these ships as Krivak II class. (11 ships built).
- Project 11351 Nerey (Krivak III): These ships lacked the SS-N-14 missile system, which was replaced by only one 100 mm gun at the bow of the ship, but more significantly introduced a helicopter deck and hangar for a Ka-27/29 Helix sized helicopter replacing the rear gun turrets of the Krivak I and II. All ships were built in Kerch and were intended for the Soviet Border Troops under the KGB. Two ships remain in service with the Russian FSB Coast Guard and one ship was in service with the Ukrainian Navy until being scuttled in 2022 to avoid capture. It is believed that a single incomplete Krivak III hull (Hetman Bayda Vyshnevetsky c. 1995) from Ukraine was transferred to Russia and then to the Korean People's Navy. NATO referred to these ships as Krivak III class. (8 ships built).
- Project 11352/11353 (Krivak IV): This was a modernization of the Project 1135 (Krivak I) ships Leningradski Komsomolets (renamed Legkiy in 1992), Letuchiy, Pylkiy and Zharkiy of the Krivak I group. The refit involved replacing the RBU-6000 anti-submarine mortars with SS-N-25 anti-ship missiles, new radar, sonar and ECM equipment. These ships completed their refits in 1990–1992, and others were to have been modernised but the programme was cancelled with the collapse of the Soviet Union. NATO referred to these ships after their modernization as Krivak IV class.
- Project 11356 (Talwar class): This is an advanced derivative built for the Indian Navy from 1999 to 2012. Three improved Nerey frigates were ordered by the Indian Navy on 17 November 1997. They are known as Talwar-class frigates in Indian naval service. Three more, armed with the BrahMos missile, were ordered on 14 July 2006. (6 ships built).
- Project 11356R/M (Admiral Grigorovich class): Derivative of the Talwar class intended for the Russian Navy. Six ships were ordered for the Russian Black Sea Fleet under two contracts signed in 2010–2011, with the first ship laid down on 18 December 2010. However, due to the non-delivery of the Ukrainian gas-turbines, construction of frigates Admiral Butakov and Admiral Istomin was suspended in spring 2015. Despite earlier reports about the resumption of construction of the incomplete frigates, in October 2018, it was announced the frigates Admiral Butakov and Admiral Istomin will be sold to India under a $950 million contract signed the same month. The last frigate, the former Admiral Kornilov, is to be sold abroad. (Total: 3 ships built for the Russian Navy, 3 ships under construction for sale abroad).

== Ships ==
| Name | Namesake | Builders | Laid down | Launched | Commissioned | Fleet | Status | Notes |
Project 1135 (Krivak I)
| Bditelnyy | Watchful | Yantar, Kaliningrad | 21 July 1968 | 28 March 1970 | 31 December 1970 | Baltic | Decommissioned in 1996 | |
| Bodryy | Brisk | Yantar, Kaliningrad | 15 January 1969 | 28 April 1971 | 31 December 1971 | Baltic | Decommissioned in 1997 | |
| Dostoynyy | Virtuous | Zaliv, Kerch | 11 August 1969 | 8 May 1971 | 31 December 1971 | Northern | Decommissioned in 1993 | |
| Svirepyy | Fierce | Yantar, Kaliningrad | 15 June 1970 | 27 January 1971 | 29 December 1972 | Baltic | Decommissioned in 1993 | |
| Silnyy | Strong | Yantar, Kaliningrad | 15 March 1971 | 29 August 1972 | 30 June 1973 | Baltic | Decommissioned in 1994 | |
| Doblestnyy | Valorous | Zaliv, Kerch | 30 November 1970 | 22 February 1973 | 28 December 1973 | Northern | Decommissioned in 1992 | |
| Storozhevoy | Vigilant | Yantar, Kaliningrad | 20 July 1972 | 21 March 1973 | 30 December 1973 | Pacific | Decommissioned in 2002 | This ship was involved in a mutiny in 1975, which inspired the novel The Hunt for Red October |
| Razumnyy | Clever | Yantar, Kaliningrad | 26 June 1972 | 20 July 1973 | 30 September 1974 | Pacific | Decommissioned in 1998 | |
| Razyashchiy | Striking | Yantar, Kaliningrad | 28 September 1972 | 22 July 1974 | 30 December 1974 | Pacific | Decommissioned in 1992 | |
| Druzhnyy | Friendly | Yantar, Kaliningrad | 12 October 1973 | 22 January 1975 | 30 September 1975 | Baltic | Decommissioned in 2002 | Scrapped 2016 |
| Deyatelnyy | Active | Zaliv, Kerch | 21 June 1972 | 5 April 1975 | 25 December 1975 | Black Sea | Decommissioned in 1995 | |
| Retivy | Ardent | Zhdanov, Leningrad | 12 June 1974 | 14 August 1976 | 28 December 1976 | Pacific | Decommissioned in 1995 | |
| Bezzavetnyy | Serene | Zaliv, Kerch | 28 May 1976 | 7 May 1977 | 30 December 1977 | Black Sea | Decommissioned in 2000 | Collided with USS Yorktown in February 1988 in the Black Sea bumping incident. Transferred to Ukrainian Navy on 1 August 1997 |
| Zadornyy | Passionate | Zhdanov, Leningrad | 10 November 1977 | 25 March 1979 | 31 August 1979 | Northern | Decommissioned in 2005 | |
| Bezukoriznennyy | Irreproachable | Zaliv, Kerch | 12 July 1978 | 3 June 1979 | 29 December 1979 | Black Sea | Decommissioned in 2000 | Transferred to Ukrainian Navy on 1 August 1997 |
| Ladnyy | Harmonious | Zaliv, Kerch | 25 May 1979 | 7 May 1980 | 29 December 1980 | Black Sea | Active | Completed refit in 2021 and returned to the fleet |
| Poryvistyy | Impetuous | Zaliv, Kerch | 21 May 1980 | 16 May 1981 | 29 December 1981 | Pacific | Decommissioned in 1994 | Transferred to Vladivostok 25 November 1994 as a training base |
Project 1135M (Krivak II)
| Rezvyy | Frisky | Yantar, Kaliningrad | 12 December 1973 | 30 May 1975 | 30 December 1975 | Northern | Decommissioned in 2001 | |
| Rezkiy | Sharp | Yantar, Kaliningrad | 28 July 1974 | 17 February 1976 | 30 September 1976 | Pacific | Decommissioned in 1995 | |
| Razitelnyy | Striking | Yantar, Kaliningrad | 11 February 1975 | 1 July 1976 | 31 December 1976 | Black Sea | Decommissioned in 2004 | Transferred to Ukrainian Navy on 1 August 1997 |
| Grozyashchiy | Threatening | Yantar, Kaliningrad | 4 May 1975 | 7 February 1977 | 30 September 1977 | Pacific | Decommissioned in 1995 | |
| Neukrotimyy | Indomitable | Yantar, Kaliningrad | 22 January 1976 | 7 September 1977 | 30 December 1977 | Baltic | Decommissioned in 2009 | Sank on 5 November 2012 in the Baltic Sea |
| Gromkiy | Loud | Yantar, Kaliningrad | 23 June 1976 | 11 April 1978 | 30 September 1978 | Northern | Decommissioned in 1998 | |
| Bessmennyy | Unchanging | Yantar, Kaliningrad | 11 January 1977 | 9 August 1978 | 26 December 1978 | Northern | Decommissioned in 1998 | |
| Gordelivy | Proud | Yantar, Kaliningrad | 26 July 1977 | 3 May 1979 | 20 September 1979 | Pacific | Decommissioned in 1994 | |
| Ryavnyy | Spirited | Yantar, Kaliningrad | 1 March 1978 | 1 September 1979 | 31 December 1979 | Pacific | Decommissioned in 1997 | |
| Revnostnyy | Zealous | Yantar, Kaliningrad | 1 March 1978 | 1 September 1979 | 31 December 1979 | Pacific | Decommissioned in 2003 | |
| Pytlivyy | Keen | Yantar, Kaliningrad | 27 June 1979 | 16 April 1981 | 30 November 1981 | Black Sea | Active | |
Project 11351 Nerey (Krivak III)
| Menzhinskiy | Vyacheslav Menzhinsky | Zaliv, Kerch | 14 August 1981 | 31 December 1982 | 29 December 1983 | Pacific | Decommissioned in 1998 | |
| Dzerzhinskiy | Felix Edmundovich Dzerzhinsky | Zaliv, Kerch | 20 January 1983 | 2 March 1984 | 29 December 1984 | Pacific | Decommissioned in 2023 | Serves with Russian Coast Guard. |
| Oryol (ex-Imeni XXVII siezda KPSS, ex-Yuri Andropov) | Oryol | Zaliv, Kerch | 26 September 1983 | 2 November 1985 | 30 September 1986 | Pacific | Laid up in 2019 | Serves with Russian Coast Guard. |
| Pskov (ex-Imeni 70-letiya VChK-KGB) | Pskov | Zaliv, Kerch | 26 December 1985 | 18 February 1987 | 29 December 1987 | Pacific | Decommissioned in 2002 | Obtained by North Korea in 2003, believed to be scrapped after 2007 |
| Anadyr (ex-Imeni 70-letiya Pogranvoysk) | Anadyr | Zaliv, Kerch | 2 April 1987 | 2 March 1988 | 30 December 1988 | Pacific | Decommissioned in 2002 | |
| Kedrov | Mikhail Sergeevich Kedrov | Zaliv, Kerch | 4 April 1988 | 30 April 1989 | 28 December 1989 | Pacific | Decommissioned in 2002 | |
| Vorovskiy | Vatslav Vorovsky | Zaliv, Kerch | 15 May 1989 | 28 July 1990 | 29 December 1990 | Pacific | Decommissioned in 2017 | |
| Hetman Sahaidachny (ex-Kirov) | Petro Konashevych-Sahaidachny | Zaliv, Kerch | 5 October 1990 | 29 March 1992 | 2 April 1993 | | Scuttled March 2022 to avoid capture | |
| Hetman Vyshnevetskyi (ex-Krasny Vympel) | Dmytro "Baida" Vyshnevetsky | Zaliv, Kerch | 27 December 1992 | | | | Scrapped incomplete in 1995 | |
| Head no. 210 | | Zaliv, Kerch | Construction had begun prior to scrapping, but never laid down | | | | Scrapped incomplete in 1995 | |
Project 11352/11353 (Krivak IV)
| Lyogky (ex-Leningradskiy Komsomolets) | | Zhdanov, Leningrad | 22 April 1974 | 1 April 1977 | 29 September 1977 | Northern | Decommissioned in 2003 | |
| Letuchiy | Volatile | Zhdanov, Leningrad | 9 March 1977 | 19 March 1978 | 10 August 1978 | Pacific | Decommissioned in 2005 | |
| Pylkiy | Fervent | Zhdanov, Leningrad | 6 May 1977 | 20 August 1978 | 28 December 1978 | Baltic | Decommissioned in 2012 | |
| Zharkiy | Heated | Zhdanov, Leningrad | 16 April 1974 | 3 November 1975 | 29 June 1976 | Northern | Decommissioned in 2002 | |
Project 11356 (Talwar)
| Talwar | Sword | Baltic Shipyard, Saint Petersburg | 10 March 1999 | 12 May 2000 | March 2002 (Russia), 18 June 2003 (India) | Western (India) | Active | |
| Trishul | Trident | Baltic Shipyard, Saint Petersburg | 24 September 1999 | 24 October 2000 | February 2002 (Russia), 25 June 2003 (India) | Western (India) | Active | |
| Tabar | Battle axe | Baltic Shipyard, Saint Petersburg | 26 May 2000 | 25 May 2001 | January 2004 (Russia), 19 April 2004 (India) | Western (India) | Active | |
| Teg | Saber | Yantar, Kaliningrad | 28 July 2007 | 27 October 2009 | 27 April 2012 (India) | Western (India) | Active | |
| Tarkash | Quiver | Yantar, Kaliningrad | 27 October 2007 | 23 June 2010 | October 2012 (Russia), 9 November 2012 (India) | Western (India) | Active | |
| Trikand | Mythological arrow consisting of three arrowheads | Yantar, Kaliningrad | 12 June 2008 | 25 May 2011 | April 2013 (Russia), 29 June 2013 (India) | Western (India) | Active | |
Project 11356R/M (Admiral Grigorovich)
| Admiral Grigorovich | Ivan Konstantinovich Grigorovich | Yantar, Kaliningrad | 18 December 2010 | 14 March 2014 | 11 March 2016 | Black Sea | Active | |
| Admiral Essen | Nikolai Ottovich Essen | Yantar, Kaliningrad | 8 July 2011 | 7 November 2014 | 7 June 2016 | Black Sea | Active | |
| Admiral Makarov | Stepan Osipovich Makarov | Yantar, Kaliningrad | 29 February 2012 | 2 September 2015 | 27 December 2017 | Black Sea | Active | |
| Tushil (ex-Admiral Butakov) | Protector shield | Yantar, Kaliningrad | 13 July 2013 | 5 March 2016 | 9 December 2024 | Western (India) | Sold to India, Active | |
| Tamal (ex-Admiral Istomin) | Vladimir Ivanovich Istomin | Yantar, Kaliningrad | 15 November 2013 | 16 November 2017 | 1 July 2025 | Western (India) | Sold to India, Active | |
| ex-Admiral Kornilov | Vladimir Alexeyevich Kornilov | Yantar, Kaliningrad | | 16 November 2017 | By 2026 | | 2016 report indicated sold to India; but later simply reported as to be sold abroad | |

== Gallery ==
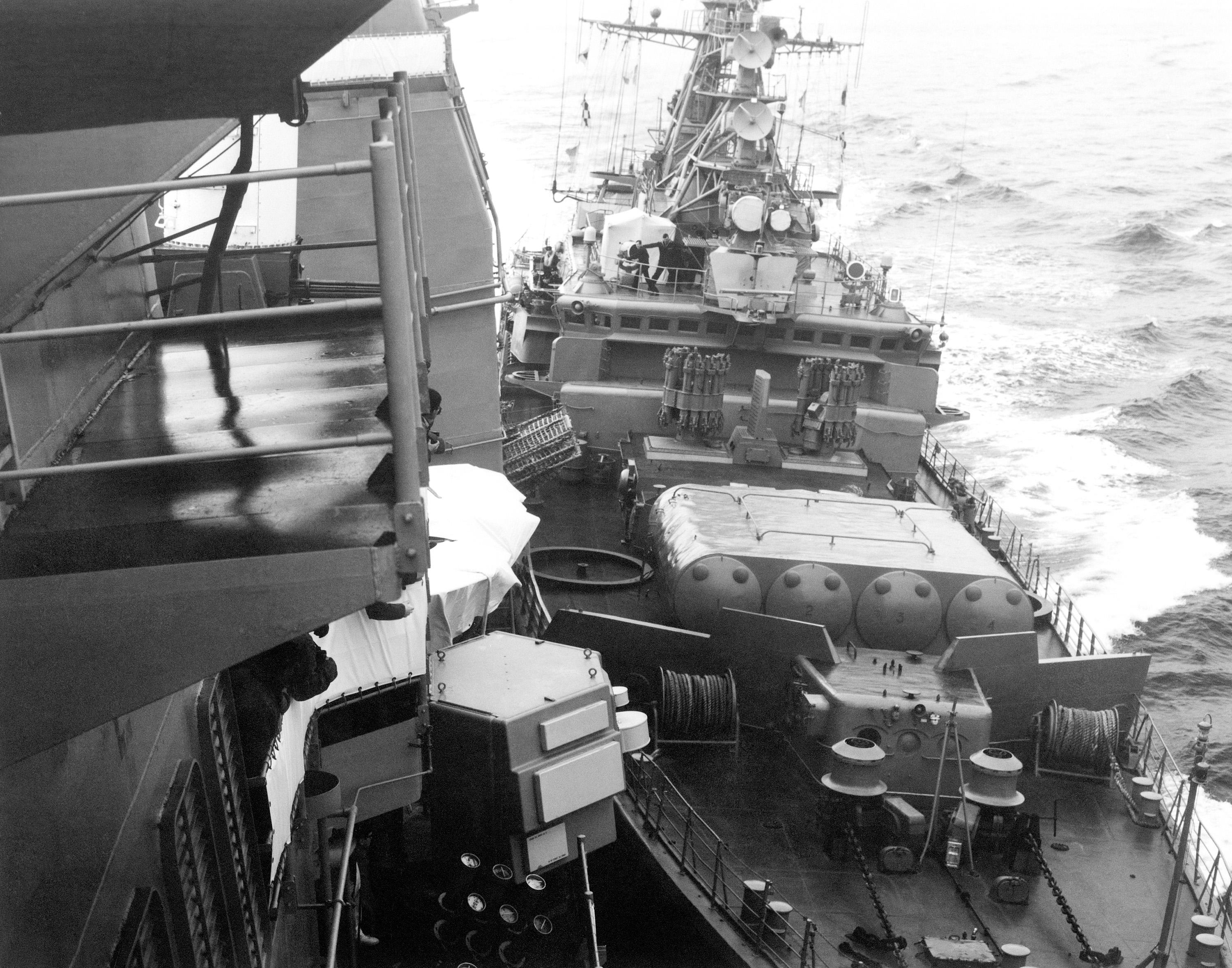
Soviet Krivak-class frigate Bezzavetnyy collides with the US cruiser USS Yorktown in the 1988 incident

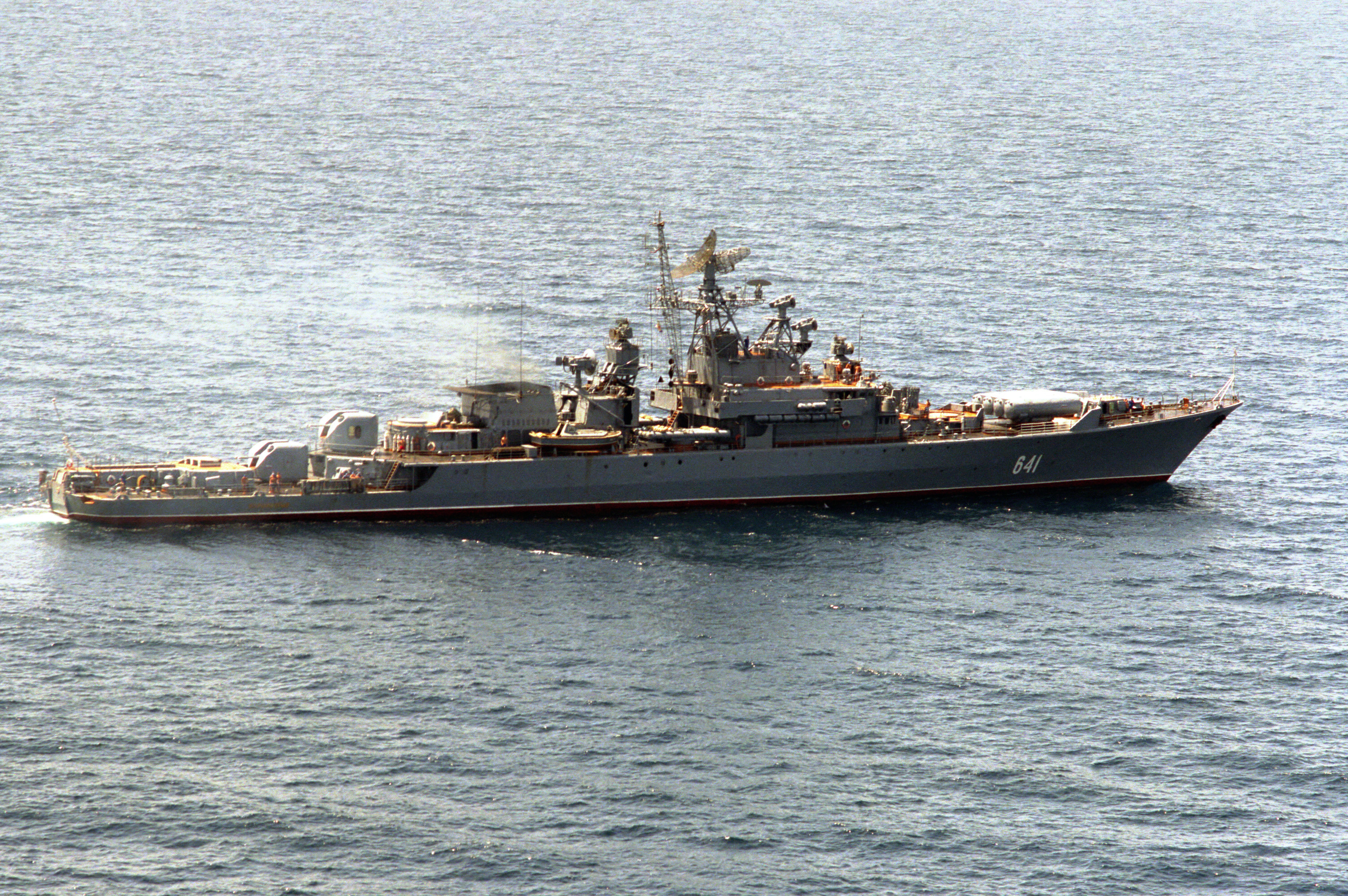
Soviet Krivak I-class guided-missile frigate Poryvistyy

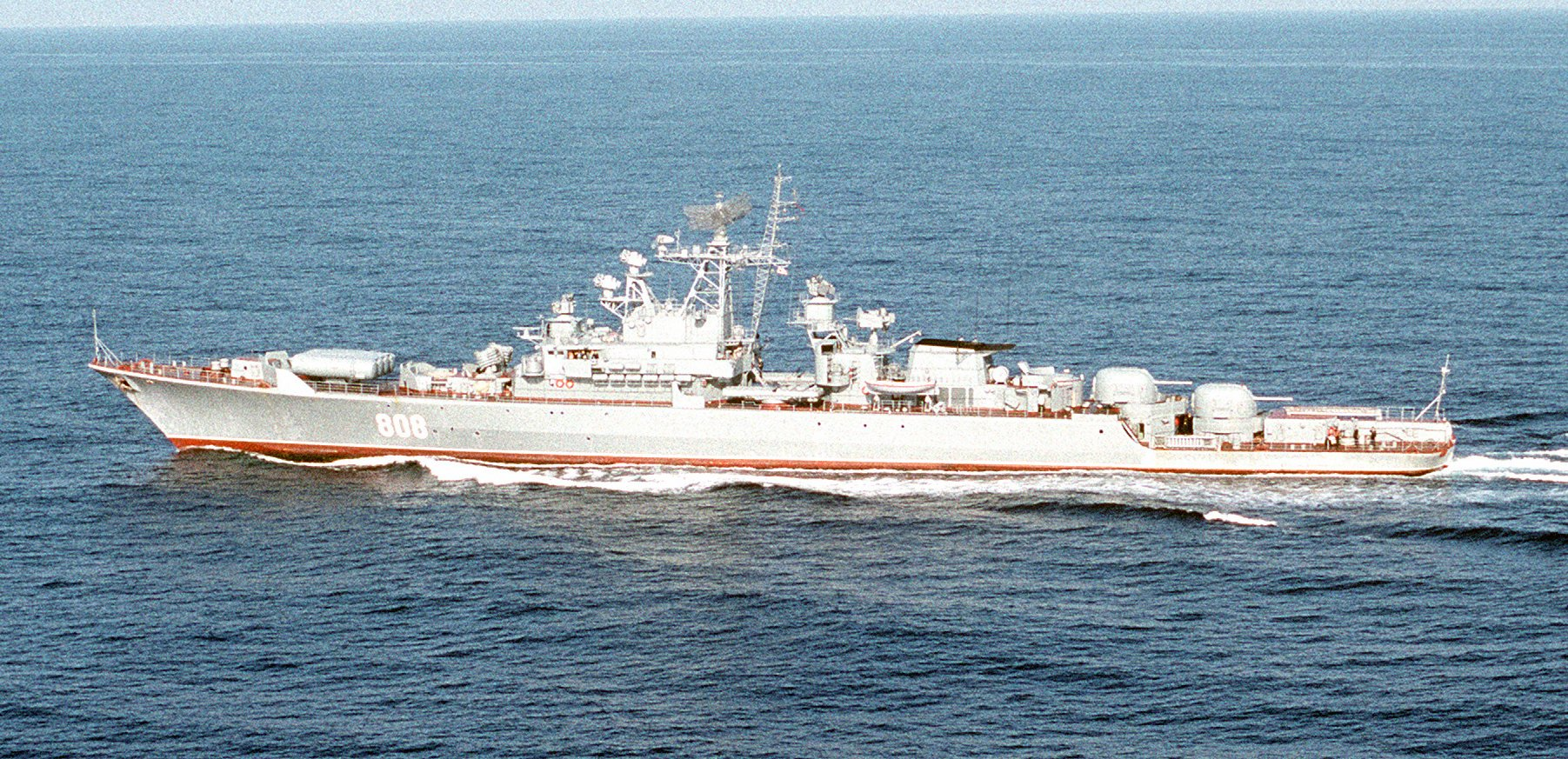
Soviet Krivak II-class guided-missile frigate Pytlivyy

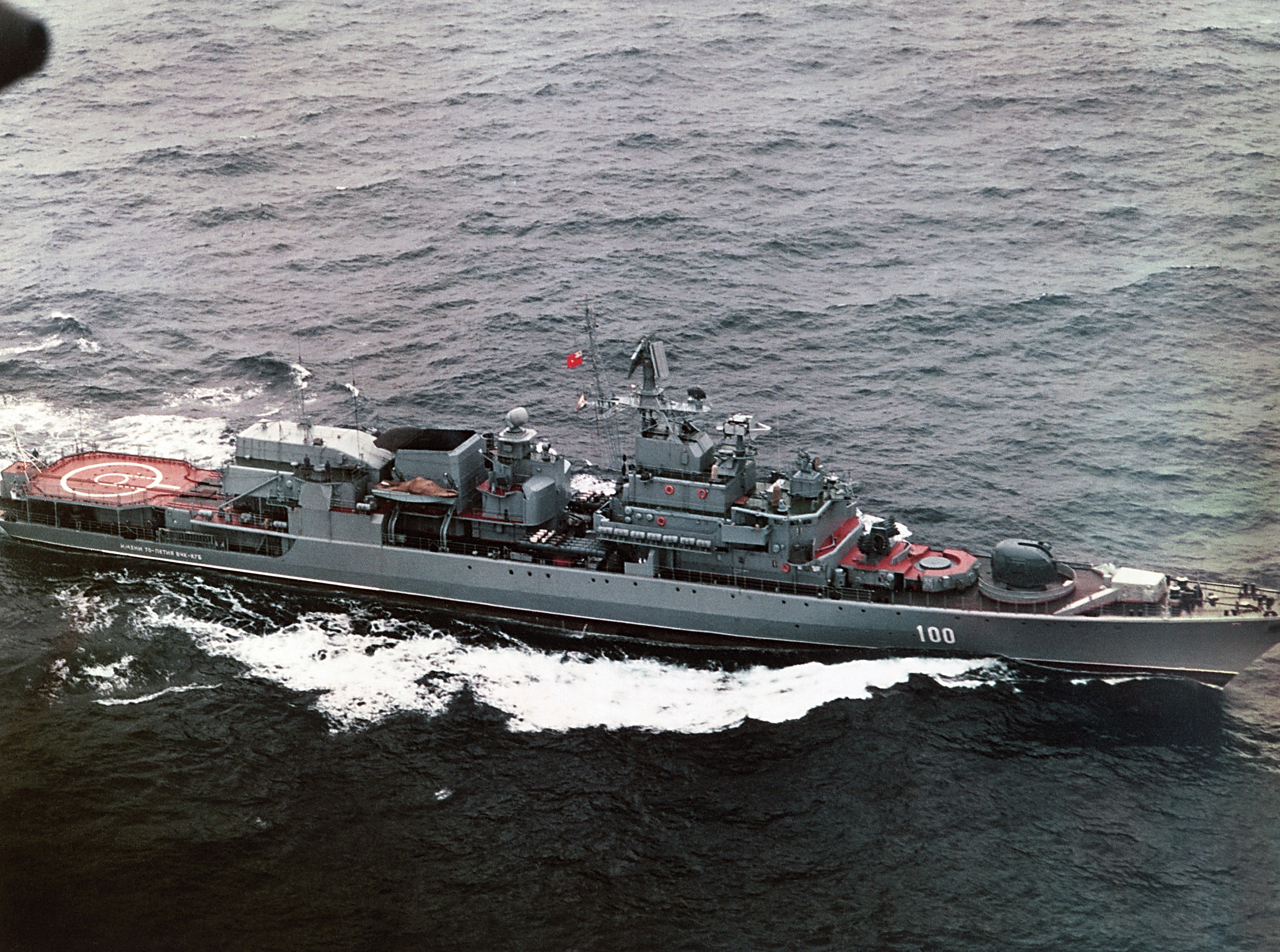
Soviet KGB Border Troops Krivak III-class frigate Imeni 70-Letiya Pogranichnykh Voisk (renamed Anadyr in Russian Coast Guard service) in 1988. KGB ensign is risen

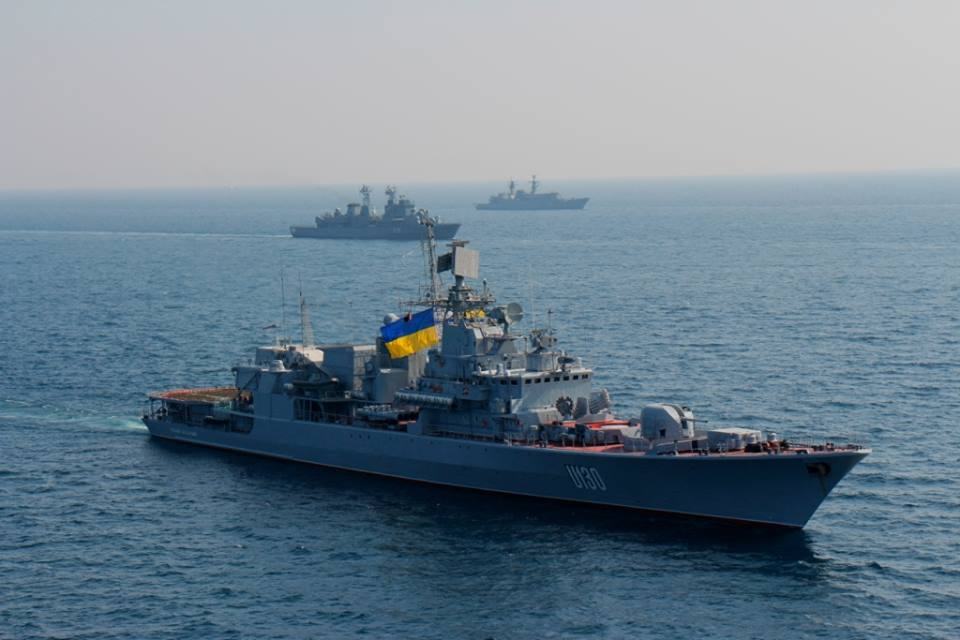
Krivak III-class frigate Hetman Sahaydachniy was the flagship of the Ukrainian Navy until 2022.

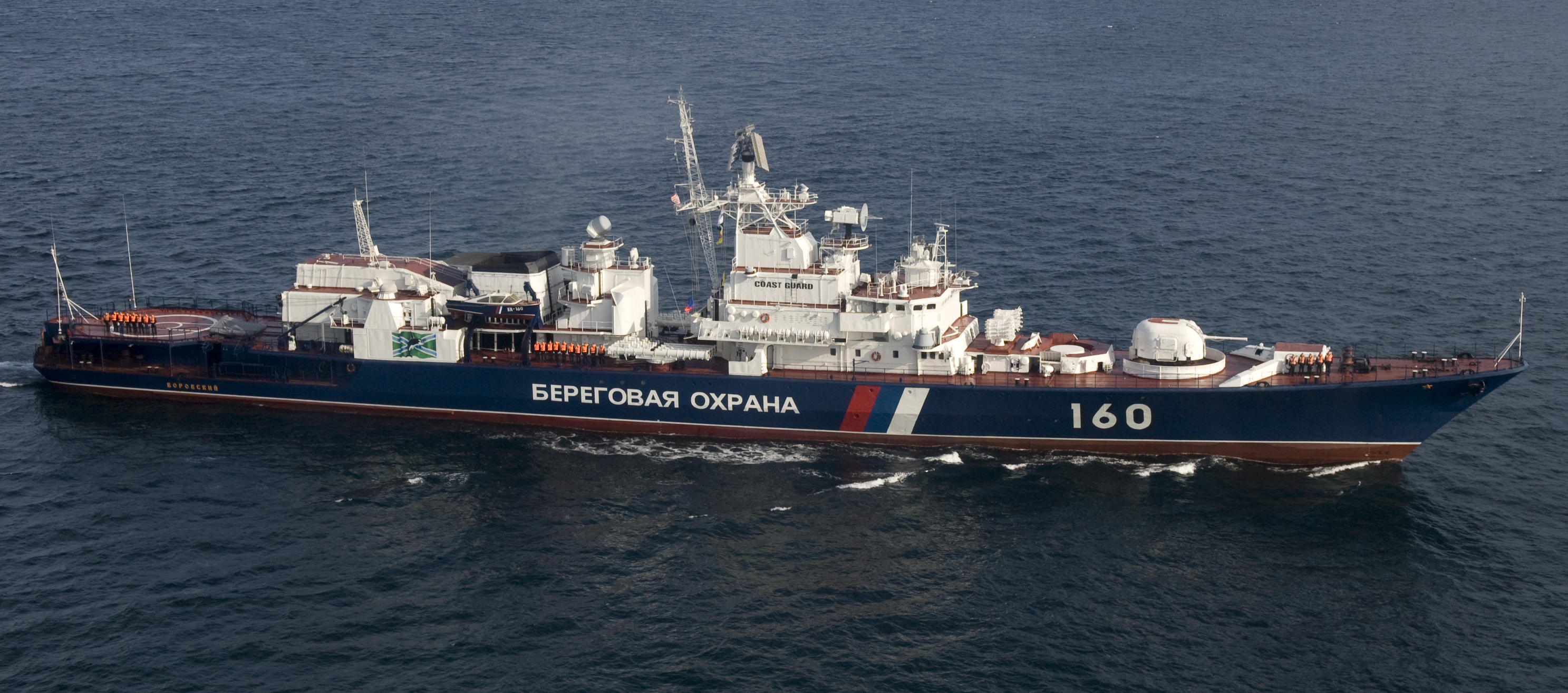
FSB Coast Guard Krivak III-class frigate Vorovskiy in Port Angeles, 2009

== See also ==
- List of ships of the Soviet Navy
- List of ships of Russia by project number
- List of naval ship classes in service

Equivalent frigates of the same era

- Kortenaer class
- Knox class
- Bremen class
- Maestrale class
- Georges Leygues class
- Niterói class
