= Soviet frigate Druzhny =

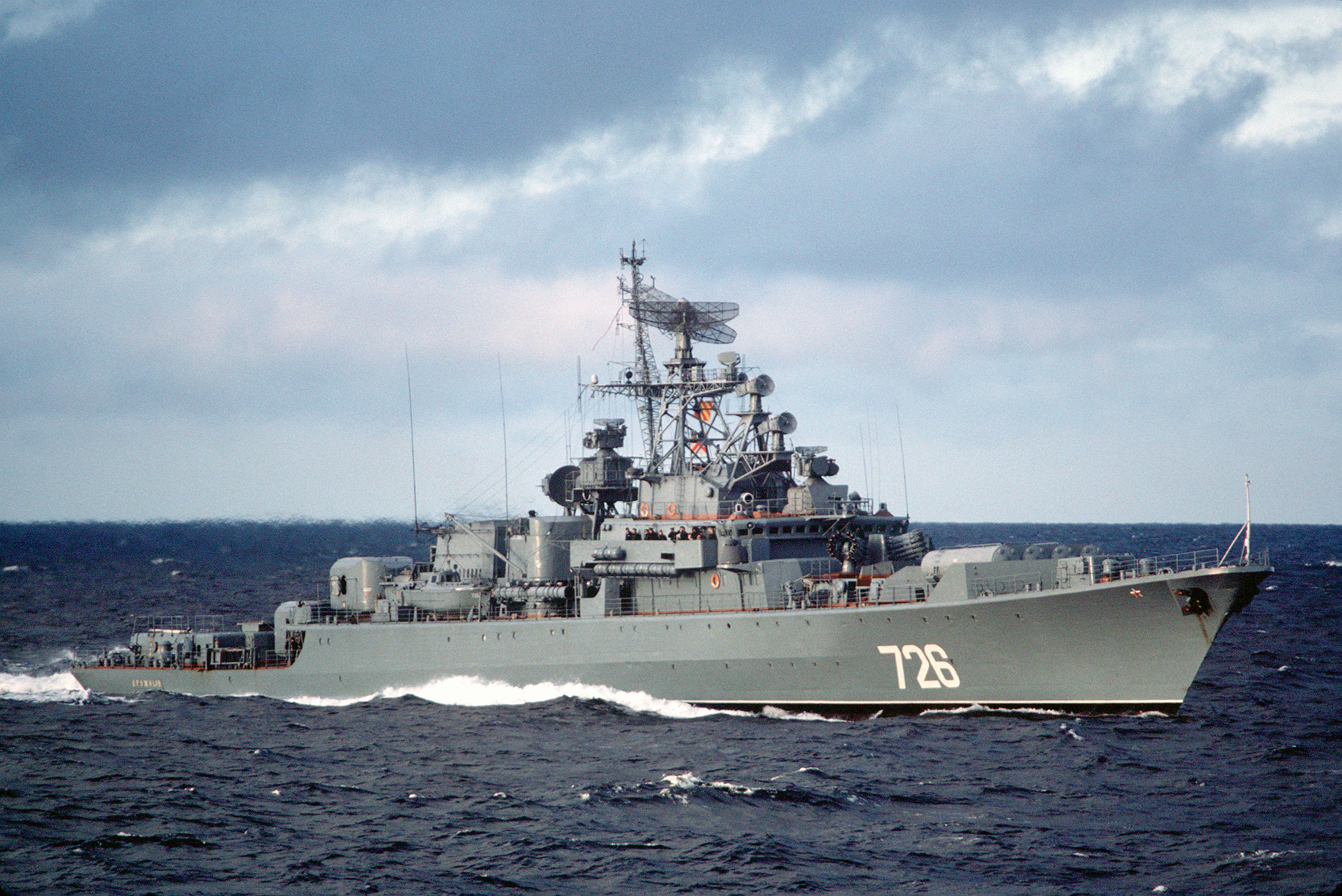
- Druzhny in 1985

History

Soviet Union → Russia
- Name: Druzhny
- Namesake: Russian for Friendly
- Builder: Yantar, Kaliningrad
- Yard number: 158
- Laid down: 12 December 1973
- Launched: 22 January 1975
- Commissioned: 30 September 1975
- Decommissioned: 10 April 2002
- Fate: Scrapped 2016

General characteristics
- Class & type: Project 1135 Burevestnik frigate
- Displacement: 2,835 tonnes (2,790 long tons; 3,125 short tons) standard, 3,190 tonnes (3,140 long tons; 3,520 short tons) full load
- Length: 123 m (404 ft)
- Beam: 8.15 m (26.7 ft)
- Draft: 4.5 m (15 ft)
- Propulsion: 2 shaft; COGAG; 2x M-8K gas-turbines, 34,000 shp; 2x M-62 gas-turbines (cruise), 12,000 shp
- Speed: 32 knots (59 km/h)
- Range: 3,515 nmi (6,510 km) at 18 knots (33 km/h)
- Complement: 22 officers, 158 petty officers and sailors
- Sensors & processing systems: MR-310A Angara-A air/surface search radar, Volga navigation radar, Don navigation radar, MG-332 Titan-2, MG-325 Vega, 2 MG-7 Braslet and MGS-400K sonars
- Electronic warfare & decoys: PK-16 ship-borne decoy dispenser system
- Armament: 4× URPK-4 Metel (SS-N-14 'Silex') anti-submarine missiles (1x4); 4× ZIF-122 4K33 launchers (22) with 40 4K33 OSA-M (SA-N-4'Gecko') surface to air missiles; 4× 76 mm (3 in) AK-726 guns (2×2); 2× RBU-6000 Smerch-2 Anti-Submarine rockets; 8× 533 mm (21 in) torpedo tubes (2x4); 18 mines

Druzhny (Russian: Дружный, "Friendly") was a Project 1135 Burevestnik-class Large Anti-Submarine Ship (Большой Противолодочный Корабль, BPK) or Krivak-class frigate. Launched on 22 January 1975, the vessel served with the Soviet Navy until it was dissolved and then was transferred to the Russian Navy. After being retired on 10 April 2002, there was an unsuccessful attempt to refit the warship as a shopping and leisure facility, but instead the vessel was scrapped.

== Design and development ==
=== Development ===
Druzhny was a Project 1135 Large Anti-Submarine Ship (Большой Противолодочный Корабль, BPK), one of twenty one that were launched in the 1970s. Designed by N.P. Sobolov, the vessel served with the Soviet Navy, and the Russian Navy after the dissolution of the Soviet Union, as an anti-submarine frigate. The ship was designated a Guard Ship (Сторожевой Корабль, SKR) from 28 July 1977.

=== Design ===
Displacing 2,835 tonnes (2,790 long tons; 3,125 short tons) standard and 3,190 tonnes (3,140 long tons; 3,520 short tons) full load, Druzhny was 123 m (404 ft) in length overall, with a beam of 26 feet 9 inches (8.15 m) and a draught of 9 feet (2.74 m). Power was provided by a combination of two 17,000 horsepower (13,000 kW) M8K and two 6,000 horsepower (4,500 kW) M62 gas turbines installed as a COGAG set named М7К for a design speed of 32 knots (59 km/h). Range was 4,000 nmi (7,408 km) at 14 knots (26 km/h), 3,515 nmi (6,510 km) at 18 knots (33 km/h), 3,155 nmi (5,843 km) at 24 knots (44 km/h) and 1,240 nmi (2,296 km) at 32 knots (59 km/h). A complement of 180, including 22 officers, was carried.

=== Armament ===
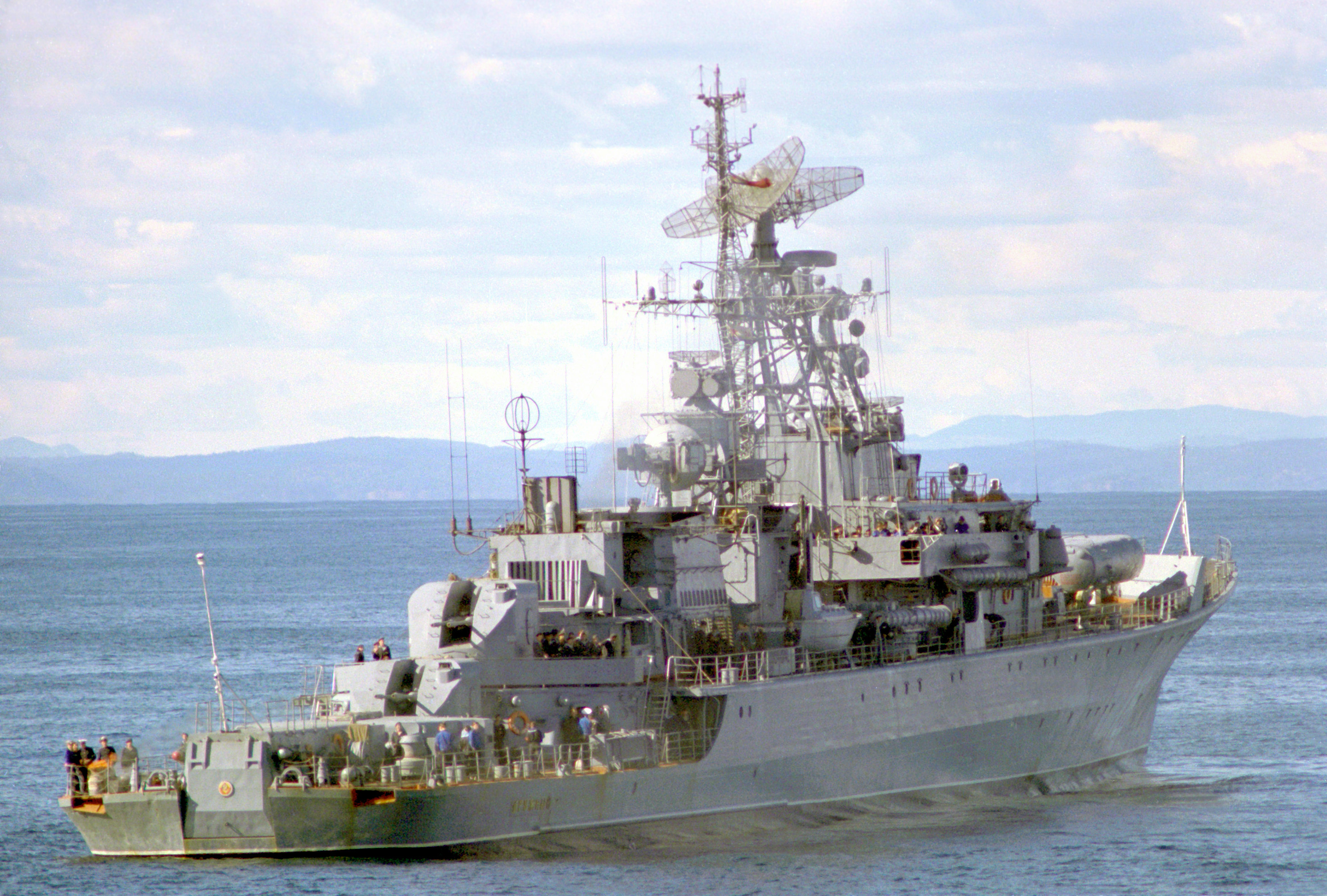
Starboard quarter view of Druzhny observing NATO exercise Northern Wedding in 1986.

Druzhny was designed for anti-submarine warfare around four URPK-4 Metel missiles (NATO reporting name SS-N-14 'Silex'), backed up by 533 millimetres (21 in) torpedoes and a pair of RBU-6000 213 mm (8 in) anti-submarine rocket launchers. The missiles were upgraded to URPK-5 as part of a major repair and modernisation undertaken between 1 July 1988 and 21 January 1992. Defence against aircraft was provided by forty 4K33 OSA-M (SA-N-4'Gecko') surface to air missiles which were launched from four ZIF-122 launchers. Two twin 76 mm (3 in) AK-726 guns were mounted aft. Mines were also carried, either eighteen IGDM-500 KSM, fourteen KAM, fourteen KB Krab, ten Serpey, four PMR-1, seven PMR-2, seven MTPK-1, fourteen RM-1 mines or twelve UDM-2.

The ship had a well-equipped sensor suite, including a single MR-310A Angara-A air/surface search radar, Volga navigation radar, Don navigation radar, MP-401S Start-S ESM radar system, Nickel-KM and Khrom-KM IFF and ARP-50R radio direction finder. An extensive sonar complement was fitted, including MG-332 Titan-2, MG-325 Vega and MGS-400K, along with two MG-7 Braslet anti-saboteur sonars and the MG-26 Hosta underwater communication system. The PK-16 ship-borne decoy dispenser system was fitted, initially with 128 AZ-TST-60 rounds, later upgraded to AZ-TSP-60UM from 1991 and AZ-TSTM-60U from 1994.

== Construction and service ==
=== Construction ===
Druzhny was the eighth Project 1135 ship built by Yantar and was laid down in Kaliningrad on 12 December 1973 with yard number 158. The vessel was launched on 22 January 1975 and commissioned on 30 September later that year.

=== Service ===
Druzhny was initially assigned to the Pacific Fleet. Redeployed to the Baltic Fleet on 25 October 1975 as part of the 128th Brigate, the ship undertook a number of international visits including Gothenburg, Sweden, in August 1978, Rostock, East Germany, in October 1979, Helsinki, Finland, in August 1981, Tunis, Tunisia, in May 1983 and Cídiz, Spain, in June 1993.

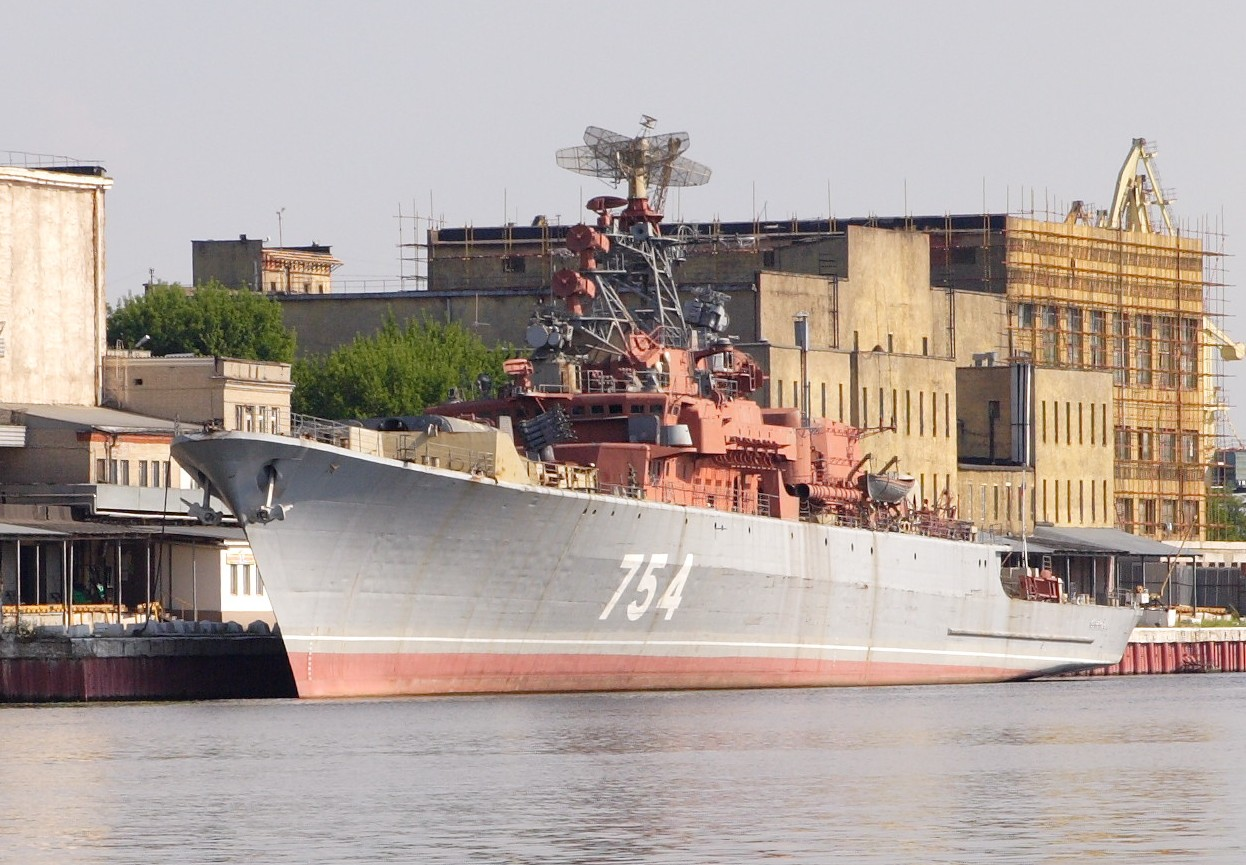
Druzhny in July 2010

After twenty seven years service, Druzhny was decommissioned on 10 April 2002. The ship was rescued from scrapping with a plan to be converted, by Project 1135MK, into a shopping and entertainment complex, but the project was not completed and the ship was scrapped in 2016.

== Selected Pennant numbers ==
Pennant number	Date
200	1975
511	1978
710	1979
510	1981
740	1981
700	1982
665	1984
733	1985
726	1985
750	1987
741	1989
754	1992
