= Combined gas and gas =

Two-turbine, one-shaft marine propulsion

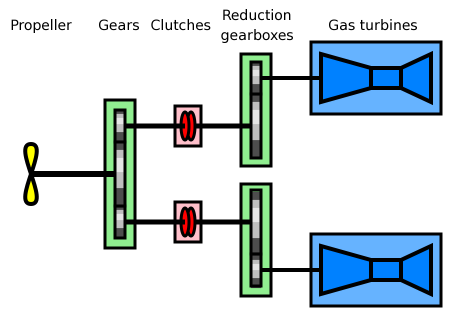
Principle of a COGAG propulsion system

Combined gas turbine and gas turbine (COGAG) is a type of propulsion system for ships using two gas turbines connected to a single propeller shaft. A gearbox and clutches allow either of the turbines to drive the shaft or both of them combined. Marine usage of COGAG systems are similar to those found ashore.

== Description ==
Combined marine propulsion
Combined diesel or gas	(CODOG)
Combined diesel and gas	(CODAG)
Combined diesel–electric and diesel	(CODLAD)
Combined diesel–electric and gas	(CODLAG)
Combined diesel and diesel	(CODAD)
Combined steam and gas	(COSAG)
Combined gas or gas	(COGOG)
Combined gas and gas	(COGAG)
Combined gas and steam	(COGAS)
Combined nuclear and steam	(CONAS)
Integrated electric propulsion	(IEP or IFEP)

A COGAG system consists of two gas turbines, each connected to a reduction gearbox. These are each attached to a coupling with both connected to larger gearbox and then to the ship's propeller.

== Advantages and disadvantages ==
Advantages of the system include a large degree of automation along with quick startup time, they are easier to silence and protect from shock. Compared to combined diesel and gas (CODAG) or combined diesel or gas (CODOG), COGAG systems have a smaller footprint but a much lower fuel efficiency at cruise speed and for CODAG systems it is also somewhat lower for high speed dashes. Issues with COGAG systems include their complexity and gearbox issues and high fuel use.

== List of COGAG ships ==
- Kolkata-class guided-missile destroyer (Indian Navy)
- INS Vikrant (aircraft carrier) (Indian Navy)
- Type 22 frigate (Batch 3) (Royal Navy)
- Invincible-class aircraft carrier (Royal Navy)
- Cavour-class aircraft carrier (Italian Navy)
- Asagiri-class destroyer (Japan Maritime Self-Defense Force), and subsequent destroyer classes
- Hyūga-class helicopter destroyer (Japan Maritime Self-Defense Force), helicopter carrier
- Izumo-class helicopter destroyer (Japan Maritime Self-Defense Force), helicopter carrier
- Type 055 destroyer (People's Liberation Army Navy)
- Neustrashimy-class frigate (Russian Navy)
- Sejong the Great-class destroyer (Republic of Korea Navy)
- Skjold-class corvette (Royal Norwegian Navy)
- Arleigh Burke-class destroyer (United States Navy)
- Ticonderoga-class cruiser (United States Navy)
