= Russian frigate Admiral Grigorovich =

Russian Admiral Grigorovich-class frigate

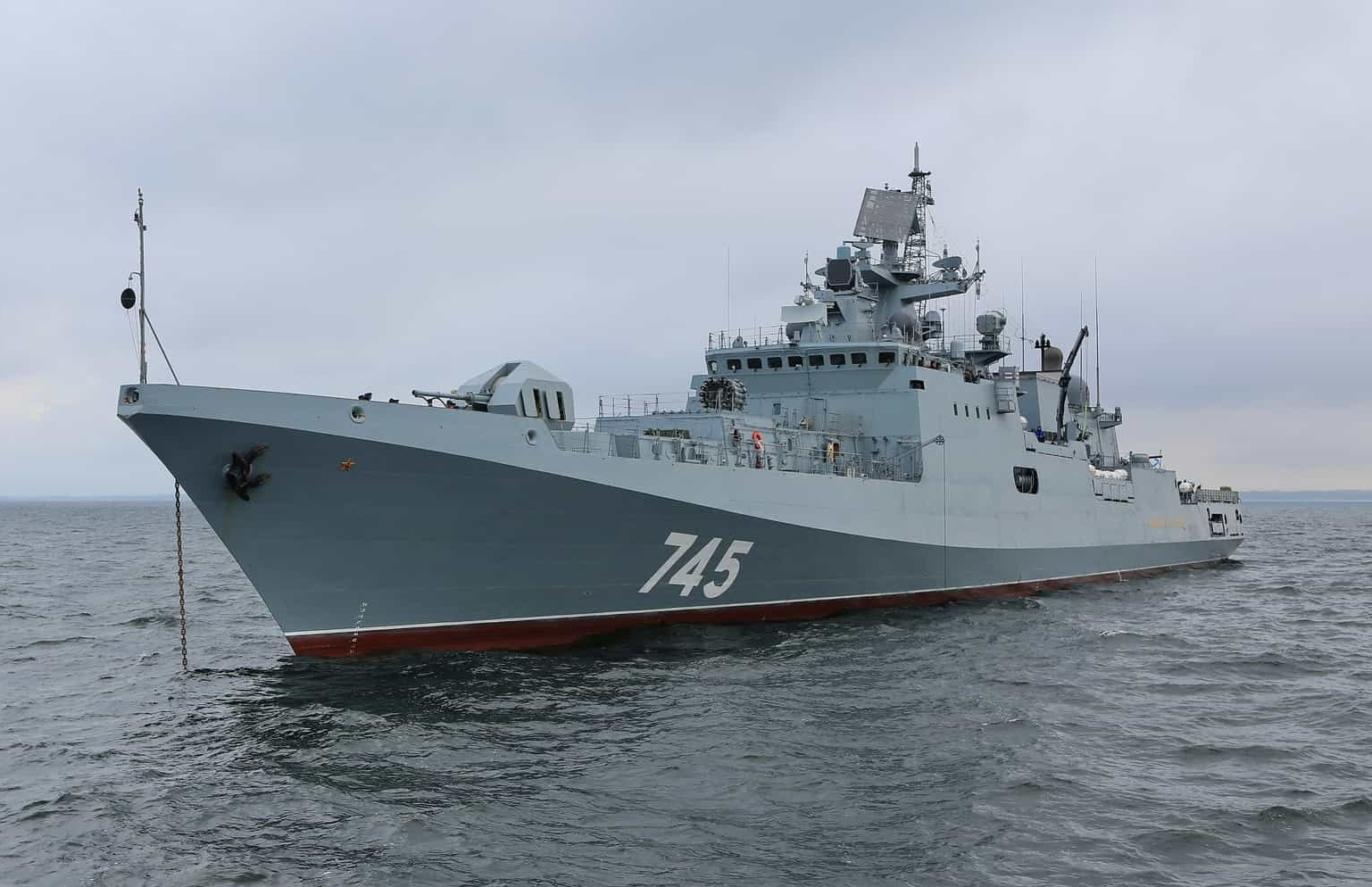
- Admiral Grigorovich in 2016

History

Russia
- Name: Admiral Grigorovich
- Namesake: Ivan Grigorovich
- Builder: Yantar Shipyard
- Laid down: 18 December 2010
- Launched: 14 March 2014
- Commissioned: 11 March 2016
- Identification: 745
- Status: Active

General characteristics
- Class & type: Admiral Grigorovich-class frigate
- Displacement: Standard: 3,620 tons; Full: 4,035 tons
- Length: 124.8 m (409 ft)
- Beam: 15.2 m (50 ft)
- Draught: 4.2 m (14 ft)
- Propulsion: 2 shaft COGAG; 2 DS-71 cruise gas turbines 8,450 shp (6,300 kW); 2 DT-59 boost gas turbines 22,000 shp (16,000 kW) ; Total: 60,900 shp (45,400 kW)
- Speed: 30 knots (56 km/h; 35 mph)
- Range: 4,850 nmi (8,980 km; 5,580 mi) at 14 kn (26 km/h; 16 mph)
- Endurance: 30 days
- Complement: 200
- Sensors & processing systems: Air search radar: Fregat M2M; Surface search radar: 3Ts-25 Garpun-B, MR-212/201-1, Nucleus-2 6000A; Fire control radar: JSC 5P-10 Puma FCS, 3R14N-11356 FCS, MR-90 Orekh SAM FCS
- Electronic warfare & decoys: EW suite: TK-25-5; Countermeasures: 4 × KT-216
- Armament: 1 × 100 mm (3.9 in) A-190 Arsenal naval gun; 8 (2 × 4) UKSK VLS cells for Kalibr, Oniks or Zircon anti-ship/cruise missiles; 24 (2 × 12) 3S90M VLS cells for 9M317M surface-to-air-missiles; 2 × AK-630 CIWS; 8 × Igla-S or Verba; 2 × double 533 mm (21.0 in) torpedo tubes; 1 × RBU-6000 rocket launcher
- Aircraft carried: 1 × Ka-27 series helicopter
- Aviation facilities: Helipad and hangar for one helicopter

Admiral Grigorovich (Russian: Адмирал Григорович) is the lead ship of the Admiral Grigorovich-class frigates of the Russian Navy. She is part of the Black Sea Fleet and is based at Sevastopol.

== Design and development ==
The Admiral Grigorovich-class frigates were designed by Severnoye Design Bureau in Saint Petersburg as project 11356P frigates and represent an improvement over the Talwar class. They are blue water multipurpose surface combatants, purposed to complement heavier Admiral Gorshkov-class frigates. The creation of the class is associated with the shift in the Russian Navy to create a smaller fleet of multipurpose vessels that are cheaper to operate and maintain, but not less capable than the Soviet ships. The frigates of the class were the first blue water combatants to carry Kalibr missiles, which have since become more widespread in the Russian Navy in a process widely referred to as "kalibrization".

Admiral Grigorovich displaces 3,620 tonnes (3,560 long tons) and 4,035 tonnes (3,971 long tons) tons when fully loaded. Ship's length overall is 124.8 m (409 ft 5 in), beam 15.2 m (49 ft 10 in) and draught 4.2 m (13 ft 9 in). The hull and superstructures have low radar, acoustic and infrared signatures. The propulsion is provided by a 2-shaft COGAG with two DS-71 cruise gas turbines providing 8,450 shp (6,300 kW) and two DT-59 boost gas turbines, providing 22,000 shp (16,000 kW), made by Zorya-Mashproekt in Nikolayev. In total, 60,900 shp (45,400 kW) are available. The design speed is 30 knots (56 km/h; 35 mph) and complement 200, including 18 officers and 20 marines.

=== Armament and sensors ===
Ship's main armament are eight UKSK vertical launch cells for Kalibr or Oniks cruise missiles, which can be used against ground targets or ships. This is complemented by a 100 mm (3.9 in) A-190 Arsenal naval gun. The air defence suite is represented by 24 3S90M Buk vertical launch cells for 9M317M missiles, as well as two AK-630 close-in weapon systems and eight Igla-S or Verba air-defence missile systems. Anti-submarine armament consists of two double 533 mm (21.0 in) torpedo tubes and a RBU-6000 rocket launcher. The ship can carry a Ka-27 series helicopter. The aviation facilities are composed of a helipad and hangar.

Admiral Grigorovich is equipped with a sensor suite, consisting of navigation radar MR-212/201-1 Vaygach-U, air search radar Fregat M2M, surface search radar for target acquisition 3Ts-25 Garpun-B and fire-control radars for artillery 5P-10 Puma, for Kalibr and Oniks missiles 3R14N-11356 and for Buk missiles MR-90 Orekh. The ship has fitted MGK-335EM-03 sonar system with Vinyetka-EM towed array sonar. Electronic warfare suite used is TK-25-5 shipborne electronic suppression system, as well as four KT-216 launchers of countermeasures.

== Construction and service ==
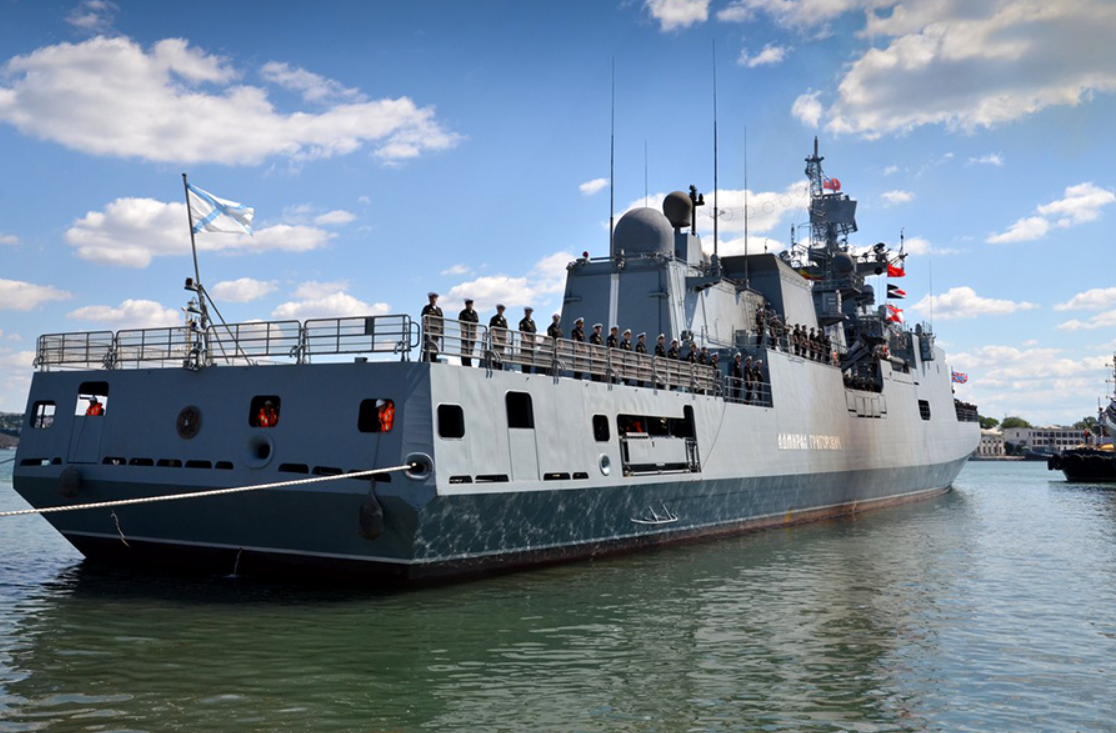
The frigate Admiral Grigorovich arriving in Sevastopol on 10 June 2016

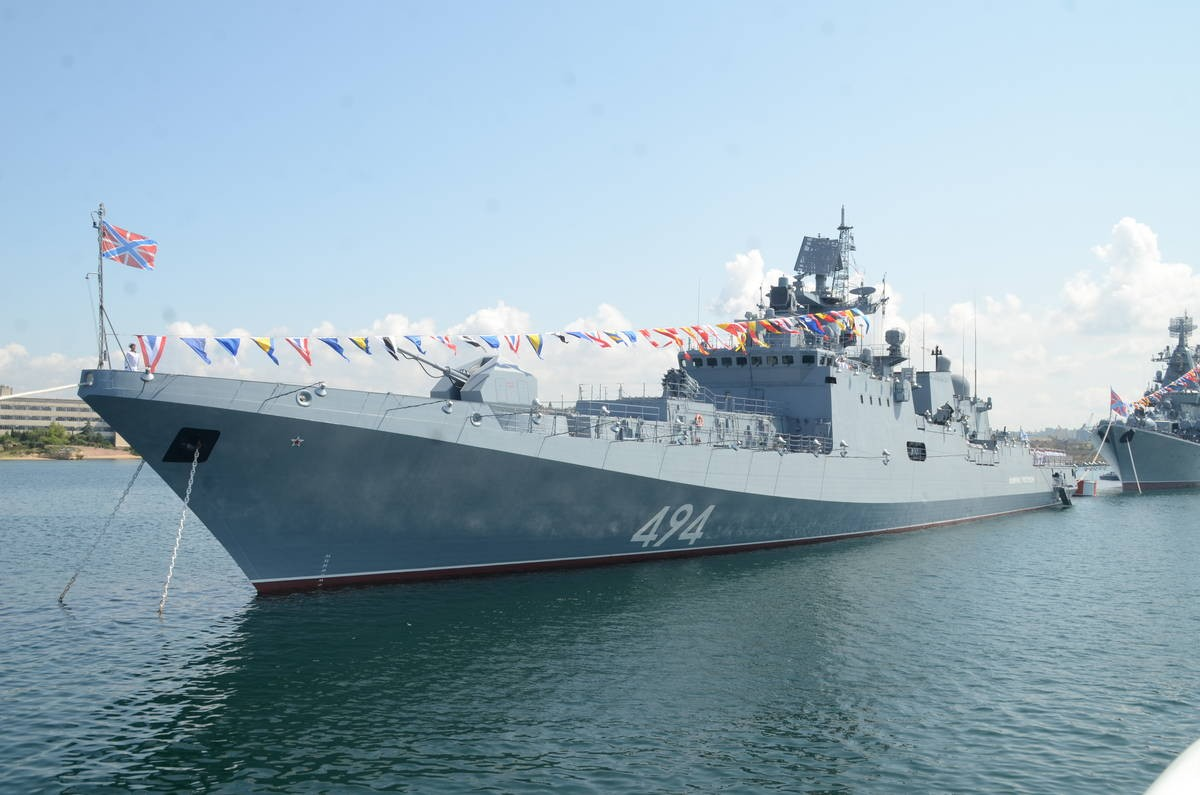
The frigate Admiral Grigorovich on 29 July 2016

Admiral Grigorovich was laid down at Yantar Shipyard in Kaliningrad on 18 December 2010. Launch took place on 14 March 2014 and the ship was commissioned with pennant number 745 on 11 March 2016 as part of the 30th Surface Ship Brigade of the Black Sea Fleet based in Sevastopol.

In November 2016, Admiral Grigorovich was dispatched to the Mediterranean Sea and positioned off the Syrian coast as part of the greater Russian campaign in the Syrian Civil War. In the course of the Russian military campaign in Syria, Admiral Grigorovich participated in a large-scale operation to strike targets in Syria by launching Kalibr cruise missiles, striking targets in the Idlib and Homs areas.

On 25 August 2018, the Black Sea Fleet announced that Admiral Grigorovich, along with sister ship Admiral Essen, was making a "planned passage from Sevastopol to the Mediterranean Sea" to join the Russian Navy's Mediterranean task force.

Between January and March 2019 the ship was in dry dock at Sevastopol for scheduled maintenance.

In May 2020, Admiral Grigorovich and the tug Nikolay Muru were deployed to the Indian Ocean. She returned to Sevastopol on 26 June 2020. On 24 December 2020, the ship entered the Mediterranean Sea and on 11 February 2021, Admiral Grigorovich arrived at Karachi, Pakistan, for drills, along with the patrol ship Dmitry Rogachev and the tug SB-739. The exercises took place between 15 and 16 February 2021. The participants focused on cooperation in repelling attacks by small fast targets and performed joint maneuvers, as well as carrying out joint measures against piracy, search operations and artillery firing. On 28 February, Admiral Grigorovich called at Port Sudan. The visit happened months after a Russia-Sudan deal for establishing a naval base of the Russian Navy in Port Sudan and it was the first visit of a Russian warship to Sudan in the modern history.^{A} In late March, Admiral Grigorovich tracked the carrier strike group of USS Dwight D. Eisenhower southwest of Crete, taking over from the frigate Admiral Kasatonov. Dmitry Rogachev returned to the Black Sea on 3 April.

In early 2022, the frigate was deployed in the Mediterranean as part of a concentration of Russian naval forces there during the Russian invasion of Ukraine.

In late November, she was absent from Tartus, likely shadowing the French aircraft carrier, deployed to the East Mediterranean. In April 2023, the frigate was reported to have left the Mediterranean, transitting via the Atlantic to the Baltic. She was reported back in the Atlantic in June. She was completed a planned repair in the Baltic Sea in October 2023.

On 6 April 2026, an Admiral Grigorovich-class ship was reported as attacked by Ukrainian drones while in the port of Novorossiysk. The ship was initially identified as Admiral Grigorovich before being identified as Admiral Makarov.

On 8 April 2026 The Daily Telegraph reported that the Admiral Grigorovich was escorting two Russian tankers through the English Channel in defiance of UK Prime Minister Starmer's threat to seize sanctioned vessels. The frigate escorted the Russia-flagged Universal and the Cameroon-flagged Enigma. A Russian presidential spokesman said afterward that Russia is defending itself from piracy.

It was reported on 16 June 2026 that the Admiral Grigorovich had fired warning rifle shots near a yacht in the English Channel between Normandy and the Isle of Wight.

== Notes ==
^A The US has recently improved its relations with Sudan as well (after Sudan improved its relations with Israel, the US removed it from the list of state sponsors of terrorism), which led to the visits of fast expeditionary ship Carson City between 24–26 February and destroyer Winston S. Churchill on 1 March, which proved to be the first visits of US warships to the country in decades.
