= Talwar-class frigate =

Class of stealth guided missile frigate

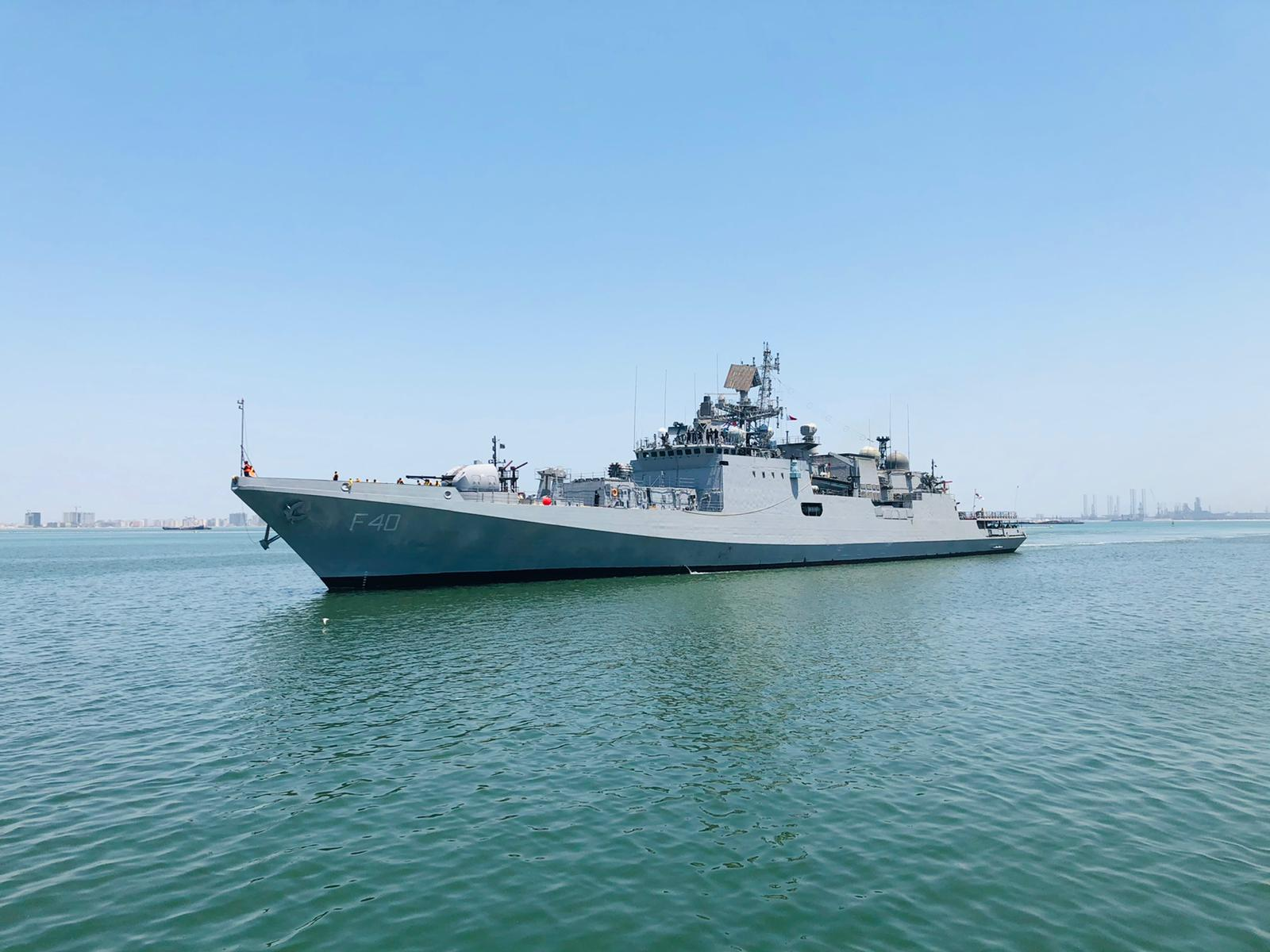
- INS Talwar (F40) entering the port of Manama, Bahrain

Class overview
- Name: Talwar class
- Builders: Baltiysky Zavod; Yantar Shipyard; Goa Shipyard
- Operators: Indian Navy
- Preceded by: Brahmaputra class
- Succeeded by: Shivalik class
- Subclasses: Admiral Grigorovich class
- Cost: $1.9 billion for 4 ships (2024 estimate, $475 million per ship)
- Planned: 10
- Building: 2
- Completed: 8
- Active: 8

General characteristics
- Type: Guided missile frigate
- Displacement: 3,850 t (4,240 short tons) standard load 4,035 t (4,448 short tons) full load
- Length: 124.8 m (409 ft 5 in)
- Beam: 15.2 m (49 ft 10 in)
- Draught: 4.2 m (13 ft 9 in)
- Propulsion: COGAG configuration; Zorya-Mashproekt M7N.1E propulsion plant; 2 × DS-71 cruise gas turbines; 9,850 shp (7,350 kW); 2 × DT-59 boost gas turbines; 22,185 shp (16,543 kW)
- Speed: 32 knots (59 km/h; 37 mph)
- Range: 4,850 mi (4,210 nmi; 7,810 km) at 14 kn (26 km/h; 16 mph); 1,600 mi (1,400 nmi; 2,600 km) at 30 kn (56 km/h; 35 mph)
- Endurance: 30 days
- Complement: 180 (18 officers)
- Sensors & processing systems: Combat Management System - Trebovaniye-M; 1 × 3Ts-25E Garpun-B I-band surface search radar; 1 × MR-212/201-1 I-band navigation radar; 1 × Kelvin Hughes Nucleus-2 6000A radar; 1 × Ladoga-ME-11356 intertial navigation and stabilisation; 1 × Fregat M2EM E-band 3D circular scan radar; 1 × Ratep JSC 5P-10E Puma fire-control system (for 100mm A-190E); 1 × 3R14N-11356 fire-control system FCS (F40, F43, F45; for Klub); 4 × MR-90 Orekh fire-control system (for Shtil-1); BEL HUMSA (Hull Mounted Sonar Array) (Batch 1 & 2); BEL HUMSA NG (Hull Mounted Sonar Array) (Batch 3 & 4)
- Electronic warfare & decoys: 1 × TK-25E-5 EWS; 1 × DRDO Shakti EWS (Tushil and Triput subclass); Decoys :-; 1 × PK-10 ship-borne decoy launching systems; 4 × KT-216 decoy launchers
- Armament: See Armaments
- Aircraft carried: 1 × Ka-28 (or) Ka-31 (or) HAL Dhruv

The Talwar-class (lit. 'Sword') frigates or Project 11356 are a class of stealth guided missile frigates designed and built by Russia for the Indian Navy. The Talwar-class guided missile frigates are the improved versions of the Krivak III class (Project 1135) frigates used by the Russian Coast Guard. The design has been further developed as the Admiral Grigorovich-class frigate for the Russian Navy.

Designed by Severnoye Design Bureau, the first batch of ships were built by Baltic Shipyard and the second and third batch by Yantar Shipyard. Preceded by the Brahmaputra-class frigates, the Talwar-class frigates are said to have semi-stealth features and better armament. The Indian Navy currently operates eight of these ships and two more are under construction at the Goa Shipyard in India.

== History ==
=== Talwar subclass ===
On 17 November 1997, Russia and India signed a ₹3,000 crore (equivalent to ₹170 billion or US$1.7 billion in 2026) contract, for three upgraded Krivak III class multi-purpose frigates under Project 1135.6. The Indian Navy wanted to fill the gap created by the decommissioning of the Leander-class frigates until the Project 17-class frigates entered service.

The frigates were developed by Severnoye Design Bureau, and were constructed by Baltiysky Zavod, St. Petersburg. The project involved around 130 suppliers from Russia, India, Britain, Germany, Denmark, Belarus, Ukraine and other countries including over 30 St. Petersburg-based naval design organizations and institutes.

The first frigate, INS Talwar was delivered in May 2002. The second, INS Trishul, was delivered in November 2002 and the third, INS Tabar, in May 2003. The Russian firm delayed the delivery of three frigates by 13 months, 7 months and 11 months respectively. The contract stipulated the levy of liquidated damages for the delays and the same worked out to the equivalent of US$38.5 million. This was yet to be recovered as of December 2005.

=== Teg subclass ===
The Cabinet Committee on Security approved the purchase of three follow-on Talwar-class frigates on 7 July 2006 at a cost of ₹5,114 crore (equivalent to ₹180 billion or US$1.9 billion in 2026). These ships will feature BrahMos supersonic anti-ship cruise missile instead of the Klub-N/3M54TE missile system which was provided to the Talwar subclass. The Government of India signed the contract for the purchase on 14 July 2006. These ships were built at Yantar Shipyard in Kaliningrad.

The ships were expected to be delivered in April 2011, October 2011 and April 2012, respectively. However, the deliveries were delayed by 12 months, 11 months and 14 months, respectively, which was confirmed in 2011 by the then Indian defence minister, A. K. Antony.

The final ship of the subclass, INS Trikand, was commissioned on 29 June 2013.

=== Tushil subclass ===
In July 2012, India Today reported the start of talks about purchasing three additional Talwar-class frigates. In March 2016, it was reported that India and Russia are still negotiating the purchase of the additional ships.

In September 2016, it was reported that India would acquire two 4,000-tonne frigates from Russia with two more to be built in India. These frigates would be based on the Talwar class and the ones sourced from Russia were to be commissioned into the Russian Navy under Admiral Grigorovich class. However, Ukraine refused to supply any more engines for the Russian ships after the Russian invasion of Crimea. By then, only two of the six had entered service with Russia.

In August 2017, the Indian Defence Acquisition Council (DAC) cleared a proposal of ₹490 crore (equivalent to ₹750 crore or US$78 million in 2026) to buy two gas turbines from Zorya-Mashproekt in Ukraine for the frigates being built in Russia. Each M7N1 system includes two DT59 top speed (boost) gas turbines, two DS71 cruise turbines, two R063, one R1063 reduction gears and its control system. It can provide a total power output of 44,000 hp (33,000 kW). The powerplants were delivered to Kaliningrad Shipyard in late 2020 to early 2021.

In October 2018, Indian Ministry of Defence signed a deal for ₹8,000 crore (equivalent to ₹120 billion or US$1.2 billion in 2026) for procuring two Admiral Grigorovich-class frigates, Admiral Butakov (renamed INS Tushil) and Admiral Istomin (renamed INS Tamal). The two frigates was scheduled to be delivered to Indian Navy by 2022.

On 11 March 2024, reports emerged that INS Tushil, being built by Yantar Shipyard had started sea trials. The initial pennant number was 435. In April 2024, a report suggested that INS Tushil would be delivered to India in September 2024 while INS Tamal would be handed over in February 2025. The timeline was on track in July 2024. By July 2024, to conduct acceptance trials for the two frigates being built in Yantar shipyard, a team of around 200 personnel of the Indian Navy are in Russia. It was reported in September 2024 that INS Tushil is to be commissioned by 2024-end. INS Tushil was commissioned by the Indian Defence Minister, Rajnath Singh, on 9 December 2024 during a formal visit to Russia. The frigate was handed over to the Indian crew of over 200 officers and sailors at Kaliningrad Shipyard.

The Indian Navy commissioned INS Tamal in Russia on 1 July 2025. The commissioning ceremony was presided over by Vice Admiral Sanjay Jasjit Singh, Flag Officer Commanding-in-Chief, Western Naval Command of the Indian Navy, in the presence of many high-ranking Indian and Russian government and defence officials. The frigates are upgraded follow-on Talwar-class.

On 3 March 2026, the defence ministry signed a contract worth ₹2,182 crore (US$230 million) with JSC Rosoboronexport for the acquisition of Vertical Launch – Shtil-1 (VL-Shtil) missiles for the upgraded Talwar-class frigates. The Defence Acquisition Council (DAC) approved the procurement on 20 March 2025.

=== Triput subclass ===
A contract, worth ₹4,000 crore (equivalent to ₹58 billion or US$610 million in 2026), was signed between Rosoboronexport and Goa Shipyard for the construction of 2 frigates under license on 20 November 2018 The contract for the two ships was awarded to Goa Shipyard Limited by the Ministry of Defence on 25 January 2019. The deliveries were scheduled in June and December 2026, respectively.

The two frigates would be armed with BrahMos missile system, two indigenous 324 mm triple torpedo launchers and the upgraded variant of BHEL Super Rapid Gun Mount (SRGM) instead of the Russian A-190E guns. The entire hull has been built using Indian steel. In September 2021, India ordered two sets of modified M7N2E units for Batch-4 frigates at the cost of $100 million which has upgrades like microprocessor control system and a power output of 58,000 hp (43,000 kW), higher than previous subclasses. The powerplants were scheduled to be delivered by December 2022 and July 2023, respectively.

On 28 September 2021, Goa Shipyard placed an order for the upgraded SRGM variants to equip the Triput subclass ships.

On 23 July 2024, INS Triput was launched by Goa Shipyard whose delivery was expected in 2026 with the next ship expected to be delivered 6 months later. As of February 2025, the last ship of the class was to be launched within few months and the schedules were on track.

The last of the locally produced Talwar-class frigate, Tavasya, was launched at Goa Shipyard on 22 March 2025.

On 3 March 2026, the defence ministry signed a contract worth ₹2,182 crore (US$230 million) with JSC Rosoboronexport for the acquisition of Vertical Launch – Shtil-1 (VL-Shtil) missiles for the upgraded Talwar-class frigates. The Defence Acquisition Council (DAC) had approved the procurement on 20 March 2025.

== Design and description ==
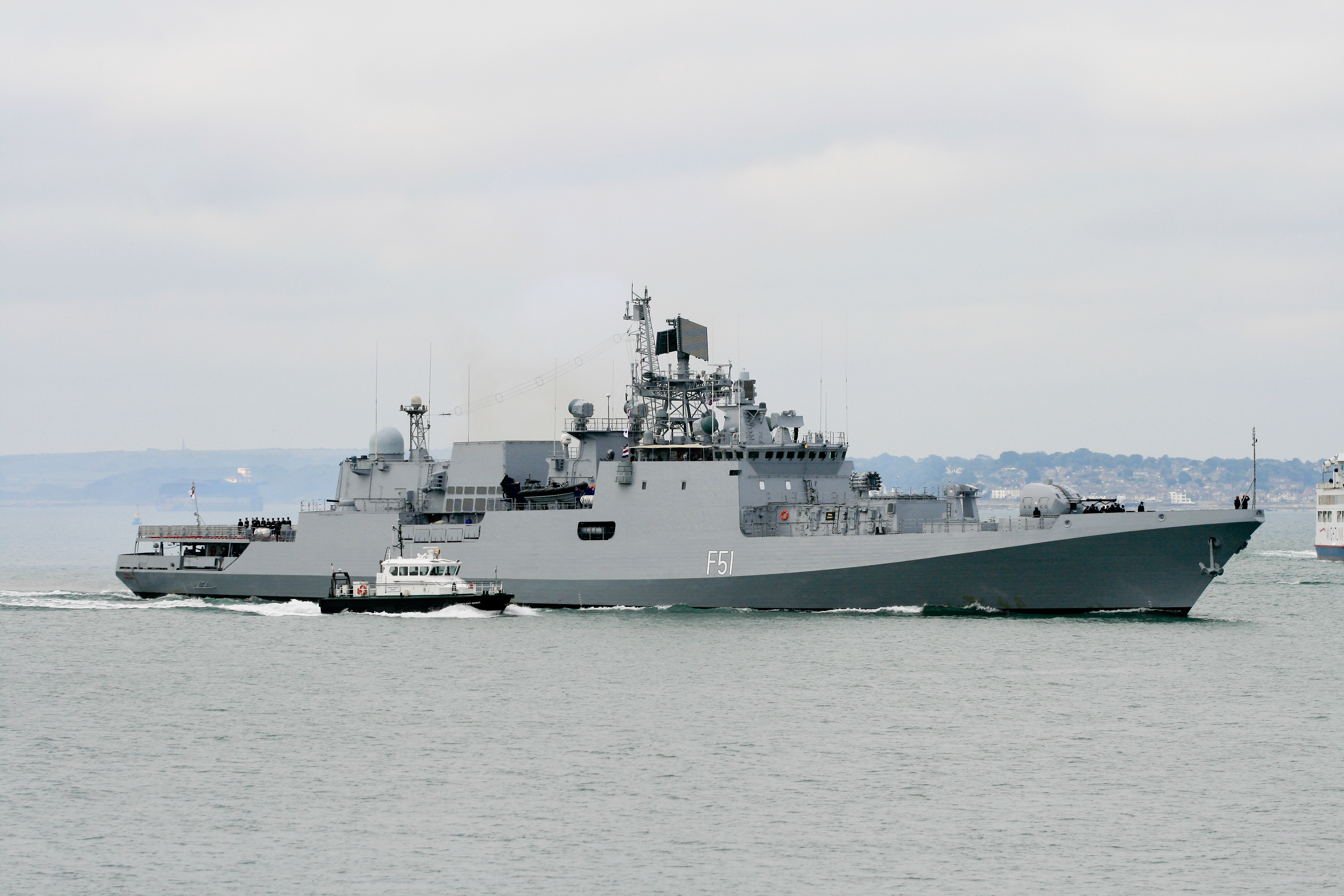
INS Trikand at Portsmouth Naval Base, UK.

The Severnoye Design Bureau developed the Project 1135.6 vessel using an earlier Project 1135.1 design, which dated back to the early 1980s. The ship's redesigned topside and hull has a considerably reduced radar cross-section. While the superstructure sides are sloped and relatively clean, the very cluttered topside of the ship cannot be remotely described as having any signature reducing features. These frigates will be the first Indian Navy warships to incorporate some stealth features. The ship's hull is characterized by outward flare and tumblehome, while the superstructure (which forms a continuous junction with the hull) has a large fixed tumblehome angle.

=== Power plant ===
The Talwars features the Zorya designed and Mashproekt (Ukraine) manufactured M7N.1E gas turbine plant which comprises two DS-71 cruise turbines and two DT-59 boost turbines in two engine rooms. The cruising component consists of two DS-71 gas-turbine engines, each rated at 9,000 horsepower (6,700 kW) in forward running, and 1,500 hp (1,100 kW) in reverse. Two cruising RO63 two-speed gearboxes and one cruising R1063 auxiliary gearbox which makes it possible to use any of the cruising engines to drive both propeller shafts. A boost component with two DT-59.1 gas-turbine engines, each rated at 19,500 hp (14,500 kW) forward running, 4,500 hp (3,400 kW) in reverse and two RO58 single-speed reduction gearboxes. The four gas turbines are mounted on isolated cradles which minimize their contact with the hull and thereby considerably reduce the transmission of her vibration and sound.

Electrical power is provided by four 1 MW Wärtsilä WCM-1000 generator sets with Cummins KTA50G3 engines and Kirloskar 1 MV AC generators. The contract for the generators was signed with Wärtsilä Denmark.

=== Flight deck ===
The Talwar class can accommodate one Ka-28 Helix-A antisubmarine helicopter or one Ka-31 Helix-B airborne early warning helicopter which can provide over-the-horizon targeting. The vessel can also embark the navalised variant of the indigenous HAL Dhruv.

== Armament ==
The frigates are armed with a new 3M-54 Klub anti-ship system with a vertical missile launcher, Shtil-1 multi-channel medium-range surface-to-air missile system (an export version of the SA-N-12 "Grizzly"), a Kashtan anti-aircraft missile and artillery system, a RBU-6000 depth charge launcher and Puma-Universal artillery system. These ships are designed to carry and operate one heavy duty helicopter.

=== Overview ===
Batch I	Batch II	Batch III	Batch IV
Surface-to-surface/Anti-ship missiles
8 × VLS launched Klub anti-ship cruise missiles	8 × VLS launched BrahMos anti-ship and land-attack cruise missiles		
Surface-to-air missiles
1 × Shtil-1 single-arm surface-to-air missile launcher (24 missiles)		2 × 12-cell Shtil-1 vertical launching system (VLS) surface-to-air missiles	
8 × Igla-1E (SA-16) MANPADS based point-defence surface-to-air missile system
Naval gun/CIWS
1 × A-190E 100 mm naval gun [All; except INS Trishul (F43)]; 1 × 76 mm Super Rapid Gun Mount (SRGM) [INS Trishul (F43)]			1 × 76 mm upgraded Super Rapid Gun Mount (SRGM)
2 × AK-630 CIWS [All; except INS Talwar (F40) and INS Tabar (F44)]; 2 × Kashtan CIWS [INS Talwar (F40) and INS Tabar (F44)]
Anti-submarine weapons
2 × twin 533mm DTA-53-11356 torpedo tubes; 1 × RBU-6000 (RPK-8) rocket launcher

=== Primary weapon ===
In the main strike role, an eight-cell 3S14E vertical missile launcher is fitted, which accommodates the 3M-54E Klub-N anti-ship missile developed by the Novator Design Bureau. The Agat Research and Production Enterprise has supplied the 3R14N-11356 shipborne fire-control system associated with the Klub-N. The 3M-54E Klub is an 8.22 metres (27.0 ft) long missile using active radar guidance with a range of 220 kilometres (140 mi). It is a three-stage missile in which the terminal stage reaches supersonic velocity (Mach 2.9) when it is approximately 20 km (12 mi) from its target.

The later batches of 7 ships (Teg onwards) are fitted with the BrahMos supersonic cruise missile, which has a range of 300 kilometres (190 mi) and a cruising speed of Mach 2.8 throughout its flight.

In May 2015, the Defence Acquisition Council of the Indian Ministry of Defence cleared the procurement of nine systems of BrahMos cruise missiles to equip the first batch of Talwar-class frigates as well as three of the Delhi-class destroyers at a cost of ₹2,700 crore (equivalent to ₹44 billion or US$460 million in 2026). By 2024, the Klub missile launchers on INS Talwar and INS Tabar of the first batch was replaced by BrahMos-capable UVLM launchers while the same change for INS Trishul done by 2026.

=== Air defence ===
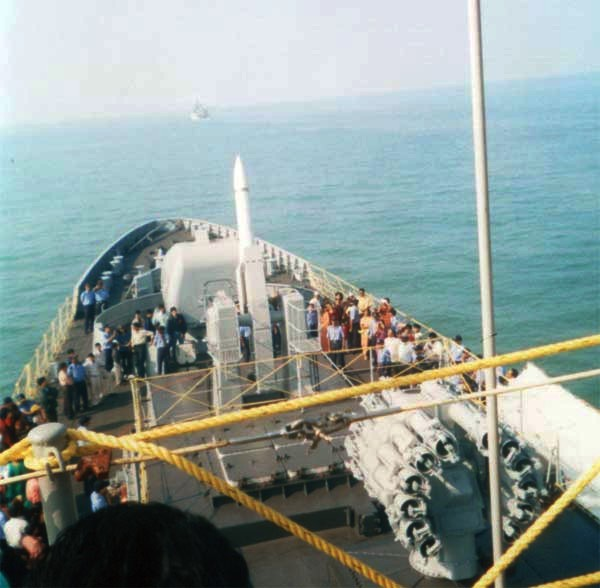
3S90E "Shtil-1" (export variant of M-22 Uragan) is a single-arm launcher version used on Batch-1 and Batch-2 of Talwar-class frigates

The Shtil-1 SAM system with a 3S-90 single rail missile launcher is fitted forward of the bridge and is armed with the 9M317 (SA-N-12 "Grizzly", navalised SA-17) missile. 24 missiles are carried in a magazine located below deck. Guidance and target illumination for these missiles is provided by four MR-90 Orekh (NATO: Front Dome) radars, which are connected to a command and control post. The SA-N-12 missile uses a combination of inertial guidance and semi-active radar homing to its maximum range of 32 km (20 mi). The 70 kg (150 lb) blast-fragmentation warhead is triggered by a radar proximity fuze. The missile's control system and warhead can be adjusted to a specific target following target recognition, which increases hit probability. Eight Igla-1E (SA-16) portable air defence missiles are also carried.

However, the configuration of Shtil-1 missiles were changed into vertical launching system (VLS) with an enhanced range of 50 km (31 mi) for Batch-3 and Batch-4 frigates. The single rail launchers were replaced by two 12 (2×6)-missile launcher configuration.

=== Main gun ===
One 100 mm A-190E gun is fitted forward for use against ship and shore based targets The A-190(E) uses a lightweight gun mount with an automatic gun and fuze setter. Fire control is provided by the 5P-10E Puma FCS. The gun can fire 60 rounds a minute out to a range of 8.2 nautical miles (15.2 km). The weight of each shell is 16 kilograms (35 lb).

By 2023, INS Trishul had her 100mm gun replaced by a BHEL 76 mm Super Rapid Gun Mount paired with BEL Lynx-U2 FCS naval gun after her refit. The other ships of the class may be similarly modified. The Goa Shipyard placed an order for the upgraded SRGM variants to equip the Triput subclass ships.

The gun features higher automation of fire preparation and control and employs advanced guided and rocket-assisted long-range and enhanced-lethality projectiles fitted with dual-mode impact/proximity fuzes. Together with the use of the muzzle velocity meter, it is designed to produce increased combat capability. In addition, the gun turret features stealth technology to minimize the radar signature of a ship.

=== Close-in weapon system (CIWS) ===
For the CIWS role, two Kashtan air defence gun and missile systems are used. Each system consists of two GSh-30k (AO-18K) six-barreled 30 mm Gatling guns, fed by a link-less mechanism, and two SA-N-11 (navalised variant of the 9M311, SA-19) SAM clusters. The system also includes a storing and reloading system to keep 32 SAMs in container-launchers in the vessel's under-deck spaces. The later batches of 7 ships (Teg onwards) are fitted with the AK-630 system, replacing the Kashtan system in the earlier ships. After her mid-life refit, INS Trishul has also been fitted with the AK-630 in place of the Kashtan system.

=== Anti-submarine warfare ===
The ships carry the RPK-8 system, which uses a 12-barrelled RBU-6000 ASW rocket launcher to fire the 212 mm 90R anti-submarine rocket or RGB-60 depth charges. The firing range is from 600 to 4,300 metres (2,000 to 14,100 ft), and the depth of engagement is up to 1,000 metres (3,300 ft).

Two twin 533 mm DTA-53-11356 fixed torpedo tube launchers are fitted amidships and fire the SET-65E/53-65KE torpedoes. The Purga anti-submarine fire-control system provides control for both the RBU-6000 and DTA-53 launchers.

== Electronics and sensors ==
=== Radar ===
- Surface search: One 3Ts-25E Garpun-B radar at I-band frequency, using both active and passive channels, provides long-range surface target designation. One MR-212/201-1 radar at I-band frequency is used for navigation and a separate Kelvin Hughes Nucleus-2 6000A radar set is used for short-range navigation and surface surveillance. Also fitted with a Ladoga-ME-11356 inertial navigation and stabilisation suite supplied by Elektropribor.
- Air/surface search: One Fregat M2EM (NATO: Top Plate) 3D circular scan radar at E-band frequency, provides target indication to the Shtil-1 missile system. Featuring continuous electronically scanned arrays, the radar rotates at 12 or 6 rpm and has an instrumented range to 300 km.
- Fire control: Features a Ratep JSC 5P-10E Puma fire control system, consisting of a phased array and target tracking radar along with laser and TV devices. The system, fitted above the bridge deck, features in-flight course correction updates via data links, has a maximum detection range of 60 km, operates autonomously and is capable of automatically locking on to four targets and tracking them.

=== Sonar ===
According to some reports, the APSOH (Advanced Panoramic Sonar Hull) hull-mounted sonar is fitted on the vessels. The APSOH sonar performs active ranging, passive listening, auto tracking of targets and classification. Other reports indicate that the BEL HUMSA (Hull Mounted Sonar Array) sonar is fitted. The HUMSA is a panoramic medium-range active/passive sonar system developed by the Naval Physical and Oceanographic Laboratory (NPOL).

Information released from the Severnoye Design Bureau (SDB) indicate that French towed array sonars (TAS) are also fitted. This is very plausible given that many Indian Navy ships now use French TAS, however INS Talwar shows no signs of such a system. The vessel may also have a Russian SSN-137 Variable Depth Sonar (VDS) with NATO reporting name Steer Hide, providing active search with medium frequency, and the sonar might be license produced in India with Indian designation SSSN-113.

=== Countermeasures ===
The frigate features the Russian-made TK-25E-5 integrated electronic warfare suite, which comprises a wideband electronic support measures system that has antenna arrays mounted in the superstructure and a multimode jammer. Four KT-216 decoy launchers, forming part of the PK-10 system, are fitted for soft-kill defence. A total of 120 120mm chaff and infrared decoy rounds are carried on board.

Some ships of the class including INS Tabar have had their TK-25E-5 ESM suites replaced with BEL manufactured Varuna ESM systems with their distinctive circular housing located above the Fregat radar.

=== Combat data system ===
- The Trebovaniye-M combat information and control platform is a fully distributed combat management system. It controls all platforms of attack and defence weapons, independently generates combat missions based on situation analysis, determines optimal number of missile firings, displays information on the state of ship-borne weaponry and transmits data to protection systems.
- Interconnected via an Ethernet LAN, Trebovaniye-M features eight T-171 full-colour operator workstations (with 18-inch colour flat panel displays) and three central T-162 servers. Individual items of combat system equipment interface to Trebovaniye-M via T-119 and T-190 bus interface units. Raw radar data is received through a T-181 data reception unit.

== Ships of the class ==
Name	Pennant	Builder	Laid Down	Launched	Commissioned	Status
Talwar subclass
Talwar	F40	Baltic Shipyard	10 March 1999	12 May 2000	18 June 2003	Active
Trishul	F43	Baltic Shipyard	24 September 1999	24 November 2000	25 June 2003	Active
Tabar	F44	Baltic Shipyard	26 May 2000	25 May 2001	19 April 2004	Active
Teg subclass
Teg	F45	Yantar Shipyard	July 2007	27 November 2009	27 April 2012	Active
Tarkash	F50	Yantar Shipyard	November 2007	23 June 2010	9 November 2012	Active
Trikand	F51	Yantar Shipyard	11 June 2008	25 May 2011	29 June 2013	Active
Tushil subclass
Tushil	F70	Yantar Shipyard	13 July 2013	28 October 2021	9 December 2024	Active
Tamal	F71	Yantar Shipyard	15 November 2013	24 February 2022	1 July 2025	Active
Triput subclass
Triput		Goa Shipyard	29 January 2021	23 July 2024	October 2026 (exp.)	Launched
Tavasya		Goa Shipyard	18 June 2021	22 March 2025	2027 (exp.)	Launched

== See also ==
- List of active Indian Navy ships
- Future ships of the Indian Navy
