= INS Tamal =

Indian Navy frigate

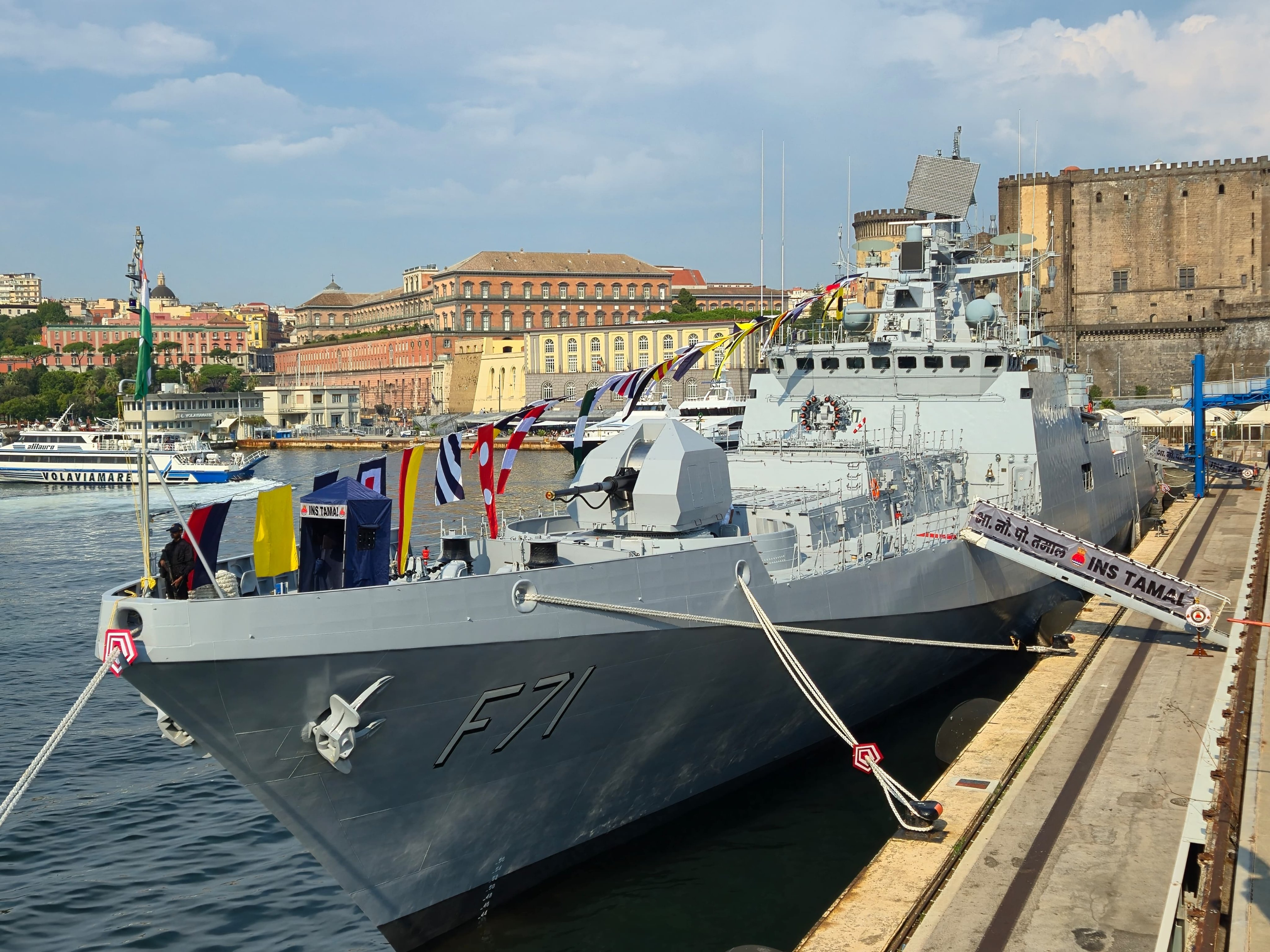
- INS Tamal in Naples

History

India
- Name: INS Tamal
- Owner: Indian Navy
- Operator: Indian Navy
- Ordered: 29 October 2018
- Builder: Yantar Shipyard
- Laid down: 5 November 2013 (as Istomin)
- Launched: 24 February 2022
- Acquired: May 2025
- Commissioned: 1 July 2025
- Identification: Pennant number: F71
- Motto: सर्वदा सर्वत्र विजयः (Sanskrit); "Victorious Always Everytime" (translated)
- Nickname(s): "The Great Bears"
- Status: In active service
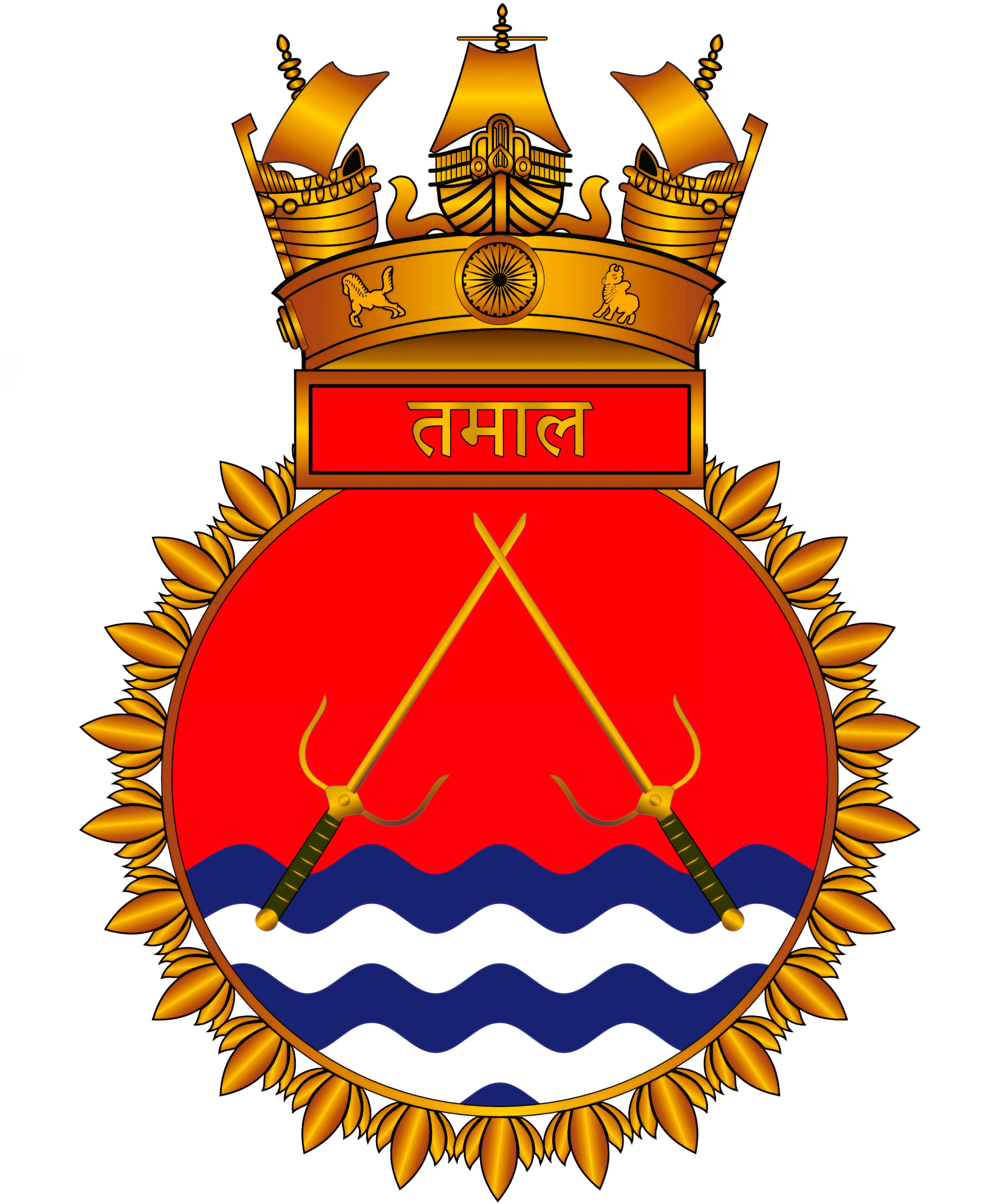
- Badge

General characteristics
- Type: Talwar-class frigate
- Displacement: 3,620 long tons (3,678 t) standard; 4,035 long tons (4,100 t) full load
- Length: 124.8 m (409 ft 5 in)
- Beam: 15.2 m (49 ft 10 in)
- Draft: 4.5 m (14 ft 9 in)
- Propulsion: COGAG configuration; Zorya-Mashproekt M7N1 propulsion plant 44,000 hp (33,000 kW); 2 × DS-71 cruise gas turbines 9,850 shp (7,350 kW); 2 × DT-59 boost gas turbines 22,185 shp (16,543 kW); 2 × R063 reduction gears; 1 × R1063 reduction gears
- Speed: 30 kn (56 km/h; 35 mph)
- Range: 4,850 nmi (8,980 km; 5,580 mi) at 14 kn (26 km/h; 16 mph); 1,600 nmi (3,000 km; 1,800 mi) at 30 kn (56 km/h; 35 mph)
- Complement: 180 (18 officers)
- Sensors & processing systems: 1 × 3Ts-25E Garpun-B surface search radar; 1 × MR-212/201-1 navigation radar; 1 × Kelvin Hughes Nucleus-2 6000A radar; 1 × Ladoga-ME-11356 intertial navigation and stabilisation; 1 × Fregat M2EM 3D circular scan radar; 1 × Ratep JSC 5P-10E Puma fire-control system; 1 × 3R14N-11356 fire-control system FCS; 4 × MR-90 Orekh; BEL HUMSA NG (Hull Mounted Sonar Array)
- Electronic warfare & decoys: DRDO Shakti Electronic Warfare suite; 1 × PK-10 ship-borne decoy launching systems; 4 × KT-216 decoy launchers
- Armament: Anti-air missiles: 2 × 12 VLS launched Shtil-1 (9M317ME); 8 × Igla-1E (SA-16); Anti-ship/Land-attack missiles: 8 × VLS launched BrahMos, anti-ship cruise missiles; Guns: 1 × 100 mm A-190E naval gun; 2 × AK-630 CIWS; Anti-submarine warfare: 2 × double 533 mm torpedo tubes; 1 × RBU-6000 (RPK-8) rocket launcher
- Aircraft carried: 1 × Ka-28 Helix-A, Ka-31 Helix B or HAL Dhruv helicopter

INS Tamal (F71) is a Talwar-class frigate of the Indian Navy. It is the eighth ship of the Talwar-class frigates and the second of the third batch of the class frigates ordered by the Indian Navy. She was built by the Yantar shipyard in Kaliningrad, Russia. This is the 51st Indian naval ship constructed by Russia (and former USSR) over a span of 65 years and also the last warship to be imported by the Indian Navy from any foreign source. The commissioning commander of the ship is Captain Sridhar Tata, a specialist in "gunnery and missile warfare".

== Description and design ==
In 1997, the Indian Navy had ordered six frigates of upgraded Krivak III class as the Talwar class, designated as Project 11356. The first three ships were delivered in 2003–2004, followed by a second batch of three ships delivered in 2012–2013.

In September 2016, it was reported that India would acquire additional two 4,000-tonne frigates from Russia with two more to be built in India. These frigates would be based on the Talwar class and the ones sourced from Russia were to be commissioned into the Russian Navy under Admiral Grigorovich class. However, Ukraine refused to supply any more engines for the Russian ships after the Russian invasion of Crimea. By then, only two of the six had entered service with Russia. In August 2017, the Indian Defence Acquisition Council (DAC), chaired by the then-Defence Minister Arun Jaitley, cleared a proposal of ₹490 crore (equivalent to ₹750 crore or US$78 million in 2026) to buy two gas turbine sets from Zorya-Mashproekt in Ukraine for the frigates being built in Russia.

In October 2018, the Indian Ministry of Defence signed a deal for ₹8,000 crore (equivalent to ₹120 billion or US$1.2 billion in 2026) for procuring two Admiral Grigorovich-class frigates, Admiral Butakov (renamed Tushil) and Admiral Istomin (renamed Tamal). The two frigates were scheduled to be delivered to the Indian Navy by 2022.

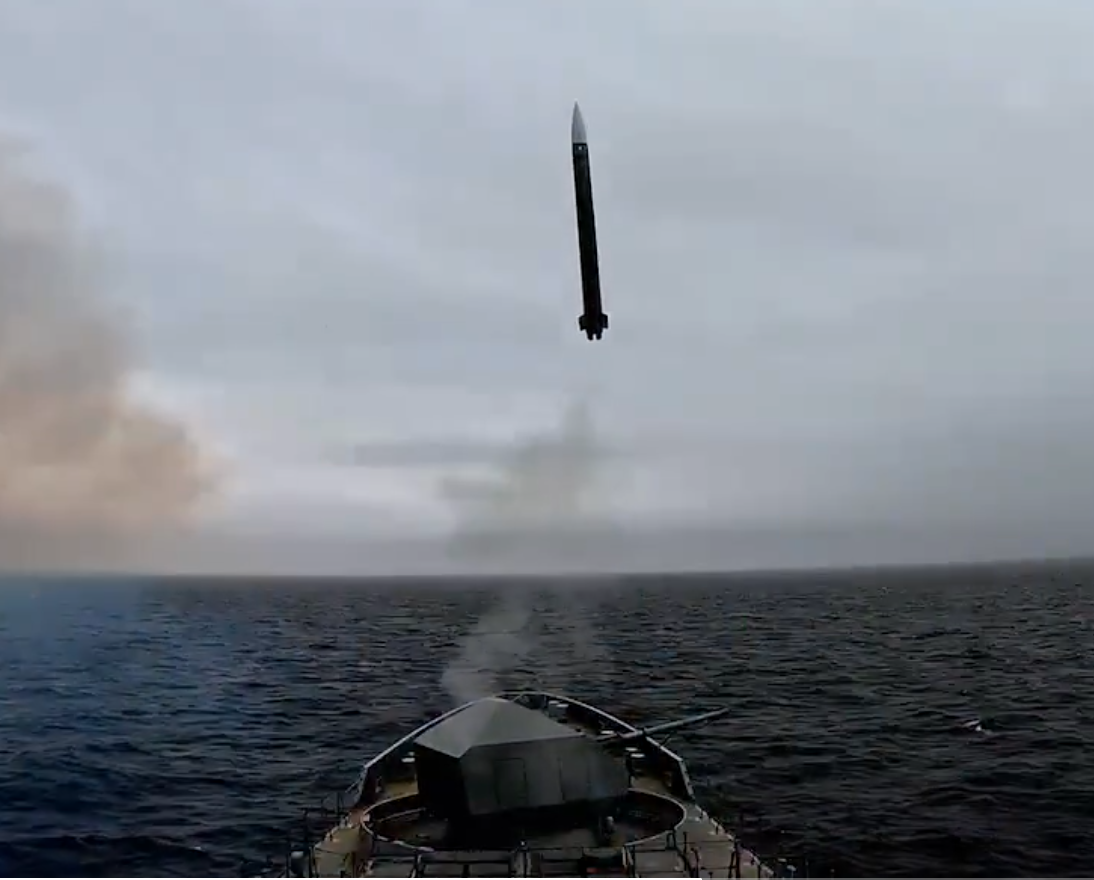
INS Tamal firing Shtil-1 air defence missile during trials.

This is the second ship of the Talwar-class frigates to feature vertical launched Shtil-1 missiles with two 12 (2×6) VLS configuration having total 24 missiles with an enhanced range of 50 km (31 mi).

== Construction ==
INS Tamal was laid down on 15 November 2013 as Admiral Istomin.

Two sets of Zorya-Mashproekt M7N1 marine powerplant for INS Tushil and INS Tamal were ordered in August 2017 at a cost of around $76 million. Each M7N1 system includes two DT59 top speed (boost) gas turbines, two DS71 cruise turbines, two R063, one R1063 reduction gears and its control system. It can provide a total power output of 44,000 hp (33,000 kW). The powerplants were delivered to Kaliningrad Shipyard in late 2020 to early 2021.

The ship was launched on 24 February 2022 and sailed for the initial sea trials in November 2024.

On 21 January 2025, reports emerged that INS Tamal, being built by Yantar Shipyard has started sea trials. The initial Pennant number was spotted as 445. In April 2024, a report suggested that INS Tamal will be delivered to India by February 2025.

On 16 February 2025, a 200 personnel strong Indian crew of the ship reached Saint Petersburg for training in order to undertake its Delivery Acceptance Trials. The crew was then transferred to Kaliningrad. Meanwhile, the ship had completed Manufacturer Trials and was undergoing State Committee Trials. The final Delivery Acceptance Trials would be 45 to 50 days long, including manoeuvres both at harbour and sea as well as weapons firings. The trials also included firing of all Russian-origin weapons including Shtil-1 air defence system, naval gun and torpedoes. Eventually, following the six-week trials, the frigate was officially handed over to India. As of May 2025, the ship would be commissioned in late June 2025 and would reach India's western shores in September.

The ship was commissioned on 1 July 2025 in Kaliningrad, Russia in the presence of Vice Admiral Sanjay Jasjit Singh, Flag Officer Commanding-in-Chief Western Naval Command. The ship completed its three month-long trials. The commissioning ceremony was also attended by Mikhail Babich, Deputy Director General of the Federal Service for Military Technical Cooperation of the Russian Federation and Vice Admiral R. Swaminathan, Controller of Warship Production and Acquisition among others. The guard of honour was joined by personnel from Russia's Baltic Fleet.

The commissioning commander of the ship, Captain Sridhar Tata, has a history of serving on 12 different warships including commanding three of them. Additionally, he participated in Operation Vijay, Operation Parakram, and anti-piracy missions. He was one of the founding member of the Maritime Security Wing of the National Security Council Secretariat under NSA Ajit Doval.

== Service history ==
In the early hours of 18 July 2025, multiple media reports confirmed INS Tamal's unscheduled presence in the Finnish territorial waters. The Finnish Navy was also reportedly in contact with the vessel since it was spotted in the Gulf of Finland and Tamal was reportedly transiting towards Bay of Bothnia. By 19 July, Saturday, the ship reached the Bay of Bothnia, which in turn is partly in the Swedish territorial waters. While the passage of an Indian warship along this route is unusual, neither Finland nor Sweden suspected the vessel of any unlawful activity. Later, the ship turned back southwards and then left the Sea of Åland on a southwards course in the afternoon of 20 July. As of the morning of 21 July, the ship reached the international waters and was in the Baltic Sea just north of Sweden's Gotland Island. However, the reason for the ship’s weekend route remained speculative, though its presence in Finnish waters was deemed permissible under the principle of “innocent passage,” as it posed no threat to the country’s peace or security.

Between 6 and 9 August 2025, INS Tamal called at Port of Casablanca of Morocco. This is one of the port call on the ship's voyage to India from Russia via multiple European and Asian ports. The ship also undertook a Passage Exercise with Moroccan frigate Mohammed VI after departure from the port.

Later, Tamal also participated in a Passage Exercise (PASSEX) with ITS Trieste of the Italian Navy before calling at the Port of Naples in Italy between 13 and 16 August 2025. On the occasion of the 79th Indian Independence Day on 15 August, a ceremonial parade was organised onboard the ship while the crew also visited the Indian embassy to Italy. The port call follows the upgradation of both the country's bilateral ties to Strategic Partnership in 2023 through the India-Italy Strategic Action Plan 2025-2029.

On 19 August, the ship reached Crete Naval Base, Souda Bay, Greece. The crew engaged with their counterparts of the Hellenic Navy and NATO Navy while the Commanding Officer called on multiple senior officers like the Base Commander of Souda Bay Naval Base, Commodore Dionysios Mantadakis, Head of NMIOTC, Captain Kouplakis Iliias and Commanding Officer of the Naval Support Activity of the US Navy, Captain Stephen Steacy. A cross-deck visit for the Tamal crew was also hosted onboard ITS Trieste in Souda Bay. The visit to Greece concluded on 22 August. The ship also undertook a Passage Exercise (PASSEX) with HS Ritsos, a Roussen-class fast attack craft of the Hellenic Navy.

On 27 August 2025, INS Tamal called at Jeddah Port of Saudi Arabia. The ship was joined by INS Surat (D69) the following day, i.e., on 28 August. The ships' crew will also interact with the Royal Saudi Navy and Border Guards as part of a goodwill visit along with diplomatic talks, sports fixture and exploring "avenues for further engagement".

NS Tamal participated at the International Fleet Review 2026 held at Visakapatanam.
