= INS Tushil =

Indian Navy frigate

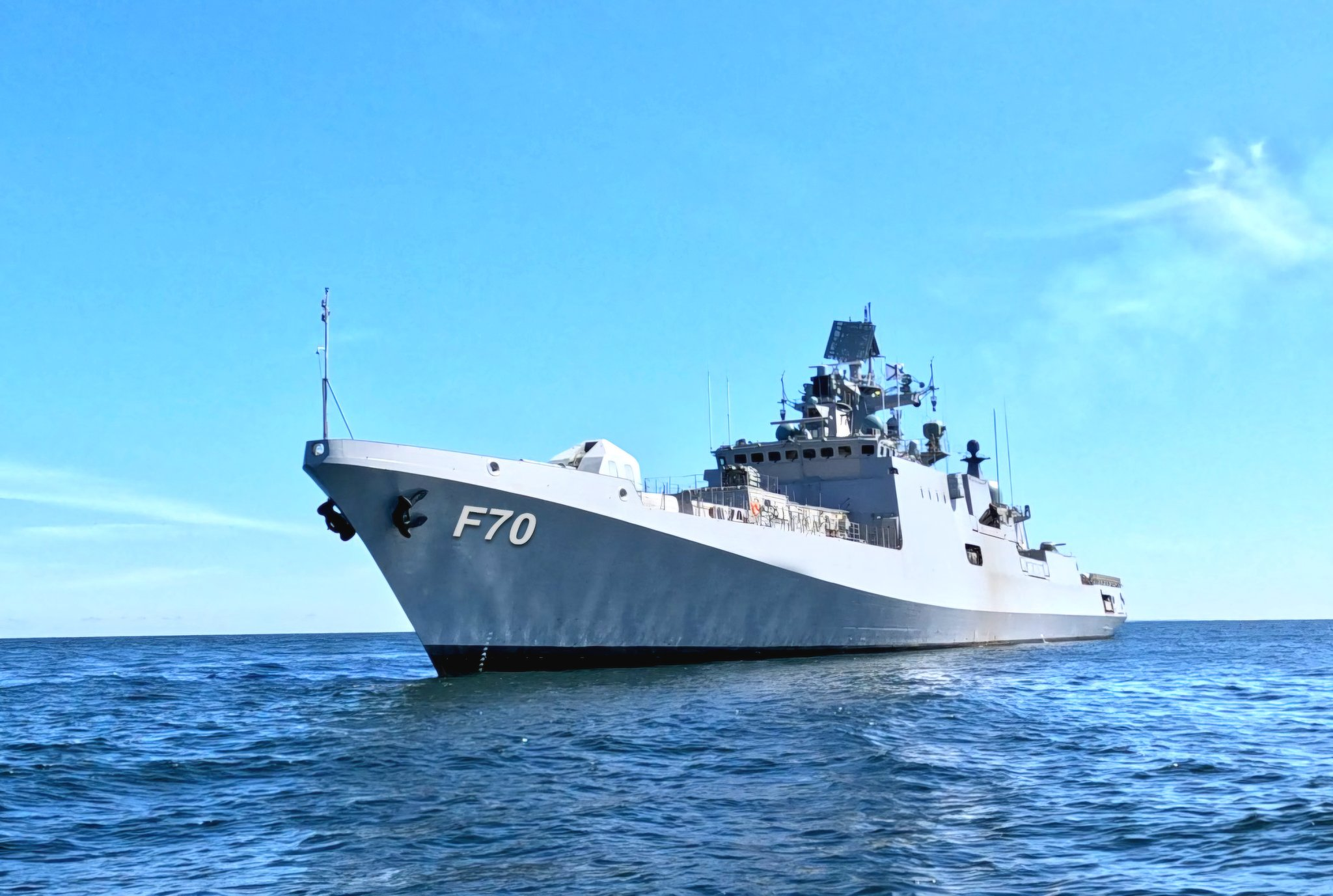
- INS Tushil in Russia

History

India
- Name: INS Tushil
- Namesake: Sanskrit word for Protector Shield
- Owner: Indian Navy
- Operator: Indian Navy
- Ordered: 29 October 2018
- Builder: Yantar Shipyard
- Laid down: 12 July 2013 (as Butakov)
- Launched: 28 October 2021
- Acquired: November 2024
- Commissioned: 9 December 2024
- Fate: Pennant number: F70
- Status: In active service
- Notes: Motto: निर्भयः, अभेद्यः च बलशीलः (Sanskrit); "Fearless, Indomitable, Resolute" (translated)
- Badge: Crest represents "Abhedya Kavacham" (Impenetrable Shield)

General characteristics
- Class & type: Talwar-class frigate
- Displacement: 3,620 long tons (3,678 t) standard; 4,035 long tons (4,100 t) full load
- Length: 124.8 m (409 ft 5 in)
- Beam: 15.2 m (49 ft 10 in)
- Draught: 4.5 m (14 ft 9 in)
- Propulsion: COGAG configuration; Zorya-Mashproekt M7N1 propulsion plant 44,000 hp (33,000 kW); 2 × DS-71 cruise gas turbines 9,850 shp (7,350 kW); 2 × DT-59 boost gas turbines 22,185 shp (16,543 kW); 2 × R063 reduction gears; 1 × R1063 reduction gears
- Speed: 30 kn (56 km/h; 35 mph)
- Range: 4,850 nmi (8,980 km; 5,580 mi) at 14 kn (26 km/h; 16 mph); 1,600 nmi (3,000 km; 1,800 mi) at 30 kn (56 km/h; 35 mph)
- Complement: 180 (18 officers)
- Sensors & processing systems: 1 × 3Ts-25E Garpun-B surface search radar; 1 × MR-212/201-1 navigation radar; 1 × Kelvin Hughes Nucleus-2 6000A radar; 1 × Ladoga-ME-11356 intertial navigation and stabilisation; 1 × Fregat M2EM 3D circular scan radar; 1 × Ratep JSC 5P-10E Puma fire-control system; 1 × 3R14N-11356 fire-control system FCS; 4 × MR-90 Orekh; BEL HUMSA NG (Hull Mounted Sonar Array)
- Electronic warfare & decoys: DRDO Shakti Electronic Warfare suite; 1 × PK-10 ship-borne decoy launching systems; 4 × KT-216 decoy launchers
- Armament: Anti-air missiles: 2 × 12 VLS launched Shtil-1 (9M317ME); 8 × Igla-1E (SA-16); Anti-ship/Land-attack missiles: 8 × VLS launched BrahMos, anti-ship cruise missiles; Guns: 1 × 100 mm A-190E naval gun; 2 × AK-630 CIWS; Anti-submarine warfare: 2 × double 533 mm torpedo tubes; 1 × RBU-6000 (RPK-8) rocket launcher
- Aircraft carried: 1 × Ka-28 Helix-A, Ka-31 Helix B or HAL Dhruv helicopter

INS Tushil (F70) (lit. 'Protector Shield') is a Talwar-class frigate of the Indian Navy. It is the seventh ship of the Talwar-class frigates and the first of the third batch of the class frigates ordered by the Indian Navy. She was built by the Yantar shipyard in Kaliningrad, Russia. The ship was commissioned into the Indian Navy on 9 December 2024. The ship is to be assigned to Western Fleet and is based at Karwar Naval Base.

== Description and design ==
In 1997, the Indian Navy had ordered six frigates of upgraded Krivak III class as the Talwar class, designated as Project 11356. The first three ships were delivered in 2003–2004, followed by a second batch of three ships delivered in 2012–2013.

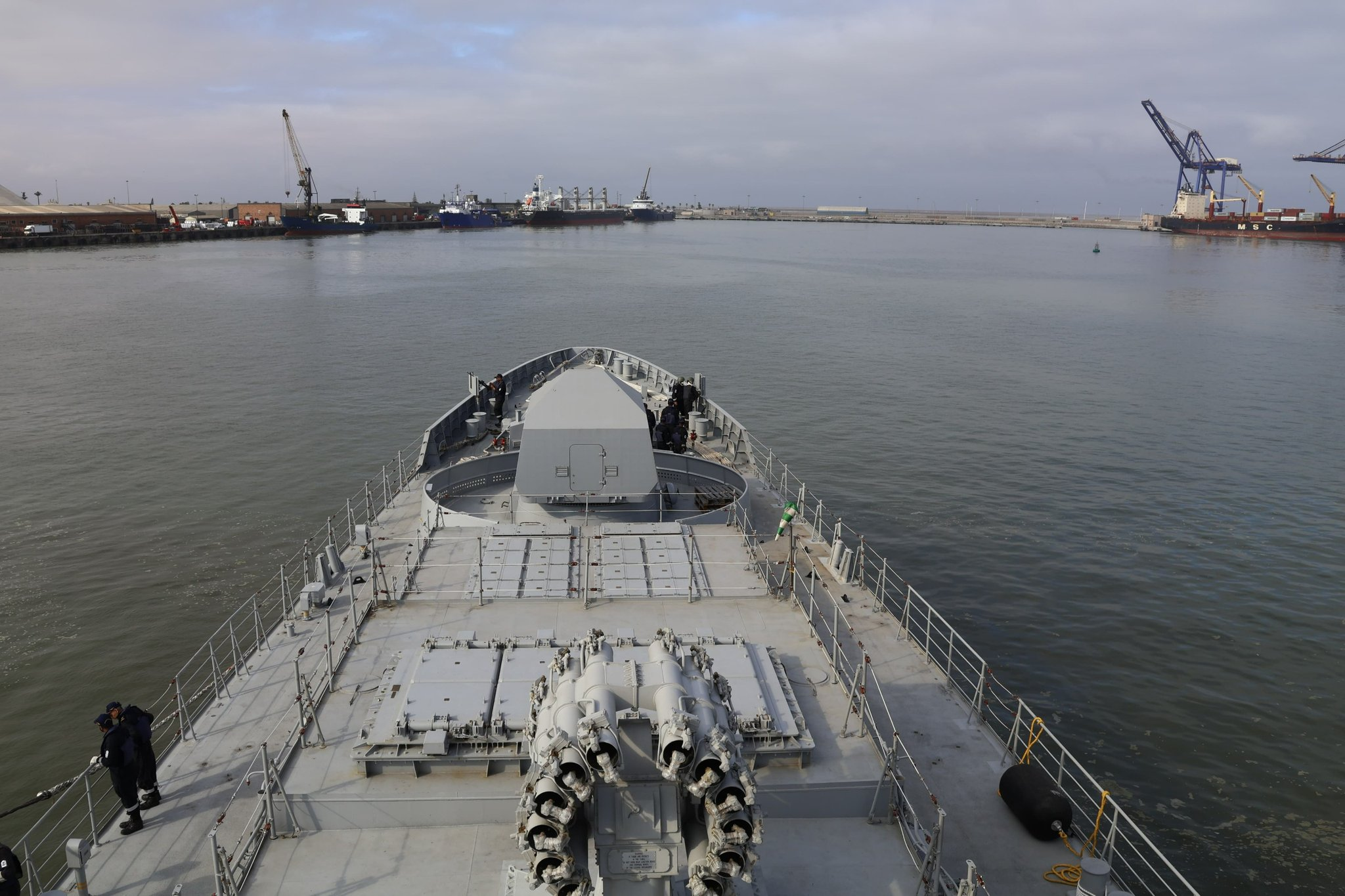
View of INS Tushil's deck [Note: VLS for Shtil-1 (forward) and BrahMos (rear)]

In September 2016, it was reported that India would acquire additional two 4,000-tonne frigates from Russia with two more to be built in India. These frigates would be based on the Talwar class and the ones sourced from Russia were to be commissioned into the Russian Navy under Admiral Grigorovich class. However, Ukraine refused to supply any more engines for the Russian ships after the Russian invasion of Crimea. By then, only two of the six had entered service with Russia. In August 2017, the Indian Defence Acquisition Council (DAC), chaired by Arun Jaitley, the then Indian Defence Minister, cleared a proposal of ₹490 crore (equivalent to ₹750 crore or US$78 million in 2026) to buy two gas turbine sets from Zorya-Mashproekt in Ukraine for the frigates being built in Russia.

In October 2018, Indian Ministry of Defence signed a deal for ₹8,000 crore (equivalent to ₹120 billion or US$1.2 billion in 2026) for procuring two Admiral Grigorovich-class frigates, Admiral Butakov (now, INS Tushil) and Admiral Istomin (now, INS Tamal). The two frigates were scheduled to be delivered to Indian Navy by 2022.

This is the first ship of the Talwar-class frigates to feature vertical launched Shtil-1 missiles with two 12 (2×6) VLS configuration having total 24 missiles with an enhanced range of 50 km (31 mi).

== Construction ==
INS Tushil was laid down on 13 July 2013 as Admiral Butakov. She was launched on 28 October 2021 by Smt Datla Vidya Varma, the wife of the Indian ambassador to Russia, D. Bala Venkatesh Varma. The ship was officially named Tushil during the launching ceremony.

Two sets of Zorya-Mashproekt M7N1 marine powerplant for INS Tushil and INS Tamal were ordered in August 2017 at a cost of around $76 million. Each M7N1 system includes two DT59 top speed (boost) gas turbines, two DS71 cruise turbines, two R063, one R1063 reduction gears and its control system. It can provide a total power output of 44,000 hp (33,000 kW). The powerplants were delivered to Kaliningrad Shipyard in late 2020 to early 2021.

On 11 March 2024, reports emerged that INS Tushil, being built by Yantar Shipyard has started sea trials. The initial Pennant number was spotted as 435. In April 2024, a report suggested that INS Tushil will be delivered to India in September 2024 followed by INS Tamala the follow-on ship of the same batch in February 2025. The timeline is on track as of July 2024. As of July 2024, to conduct acceptance trials for the two frigates being built in Yantar shipyard, a team of around 200 personnel of the Indian Navy are in Russia.

As of 11 November 2024, INS Tushil is to be delivered to India by the end of the month. The frigate is to be handed over to the Indian crew of over 200 officers and sailors at Kaliningrad Shipyard. The ship will later be commissioned by Indian Defence Minister Rajnath Singh in early December 2024 during a formal visit to Russia. The latter INS Tamal is to be delivered in early 2025.

From 25 January to 24 September 2024, the ship underwent extensive harbour and sea trials including Factory Sea Trials, State Committee Trials, and the Delivery Acceptance Trials by a specialized Indian team from the Warship Overseeing Team deployed in Kaliningrad. The trial phase included weapon firings as well as reaching a speed of over 30 knots. The ship has an enhanced indigenous content of 26% and features 33 systems by major Indian Original Equipment Manufacturer (OEMs) including BrahMos Aerospace, Bharat Electronics, Keltron, Tata’s Nova Integrated Systems, Elcome Marine and Johnson Controls India among others.

On 9 December 2024, INS Tushil was commissioned into the Indian Navy by Rajnath Singh, the Navy Chief Dinesh Kumar Tripathi and other top defence officials.

== Service history ==
INS Tushil began her maiden operational deployment on 17 December 2024 when she set sail for India from Kaliningrad. The ship will travel through the Baltic Sea, the North Sea, the Atlantic Ocean, and ultimately, the Indian Ocean. The ship will conduct port calls at several Friendly Foreign Countries as well as joint patrolling and Maritime Partnership Exercises (MPX) with multiple navies on the way. The ship, on its way to homeport Karwar, is crewed by 250 personnel commanded by Captain Peter Verghese. The ship will reach India in mid-February 2025 and will conduct anti piracy patrols in Gulf of Guinea off the west coast of Africa along with the European Union navies.

INS Tushil made her first port call in London on 22 December 2024 as part of her maiden operational deployment. On 27 December, she reached Port of Casablanca, Morocco, for a two-day visit. This was the fourth time that an Indian naval ship visited the country in the year. The ship conducted a Passage Exercise (PASSEX) with the Royal Moroccan Navy.

On 3 January 2025, she reached the Port of Dakar, Senegal. The ship also conducted a Passage Exercise (PASSEX) with the Senegalese Navy during her stay until 5 January. On 12 January, Tushil reached Lagos, Nigeria, as part of her operational turnaround, amidst her ongoing deployment to the Gulf of Guinea. On 24 January, Tushil reached Walvis Bay in Namibia after successfully patrolling Gulf of Guinea on the west coast of Africa for the first time.

The ship docked in Durban, South Africa between 29 January and 1 February after being escorted by SAS Amatola on entering the Indian Ocean for the first time. The ships conducted tactical manoeuvres followed by a traditional steam past. On 7 February, INS Tushil reached Port Victoria, Seychelles for an operational turnaround after her maiden voyage around the West coast of Africa.

INS Tushil reached Karwar Naval Base on 14 February 2025. The ship visited 8 countries in 3 continents including Lome, Togo in late January. The ship also conducted bilateral maritime exercise during visits to Morocco, Senegal, Nigeria, Namibia and South Africa.

On 7 May 2025, the ship was reportedly deployed on its first patrol into the Arabian Sea during the Operation Sindoor, along with the Carrier Battle Group centered on INS Vikrant.
