= Russian frigate Admiral Essen =

Frigate of the Admiral Grigorovich class

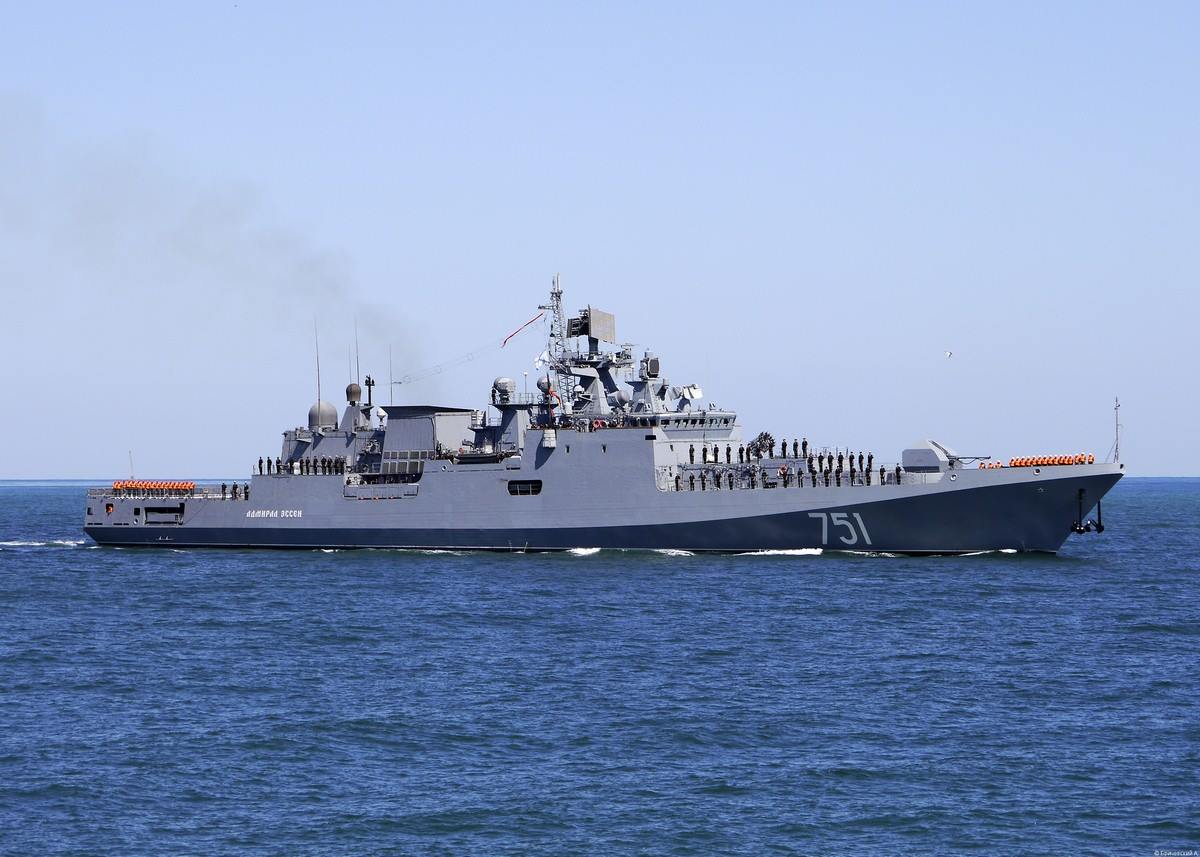
- Admiral Essen in 2016

History

Russia
- Name: Admiral Essen
- Namesake: Nikolai Essen
- Builder: Yantar Shipyard
- Laid down: 8 July 2011
- Launched: 7 November 2014
- Commissioned: 7 June 2016
- Identification: 751
- Status: Active but damaged according to Ukrainian sources

General characteristics
- Class & type: Admiral Grigorovich-class frigate
- Displacement: Standard: 3,620 tons; Full: 4,035 tons
- Length: 124.8 m (409 ft)
- Beam: 15.2 m (50 ft)
- Draught: 4.2 m (14 ft)
- Propulsion: 2 shaft COGAG; 2 DS-71 cruise gas turbines 8,450 shp (6,300 kW); 2 DT-59 boost gas turbines 22,000 shp (16,000 kW) ; Total: 60,900 shp (45,400 kW)
- Speed: 30 kn (56 km/h; 35 mph)
- Range: 4,850 nmi (8,980 km; 5,580 mi) at 14 kn (26 km/h; 16 mph)
- Endurance: 30 days
- Complement: 200
- Sensors & processing systems: Air search radar: Fregat M2M; Surface search radar: 3Ts-25 Garpun-B, MR-212/201-1, Nucleus-2 6000A; Fire control radar: JSC 5P-10 Puma FCS, 3R14N-11356 FCS, MR-90 Orekh SAM FCS
- Electronic warfare & decoys: EW Suite: TK-25-5; Countermeasures: 4 × KT-216
- Armament: 1 × 100 mm A-190 Arsenal naval gun; 8 (2 × 4) UKSK VLS cells for Kalibr, Oniks or Zircon anti-ship/cruise missiles; 24 (2 × 12) 3S90M VLS cells for 9M317M surface-to-air-missiles; 2 × AK-630 CIWS; 8 × Igla-S or Verba; 2 × double 533 mm torpedo tubes; 1 × RBU-6000 rocket launcher
- Aircraft carried: 1 × Ka-27 series helicopter
- Aviation facilities: Helipad and hangar for one helicopter

Admiral Essen is a frigate of the Admiral Grigorovich class of the Russian Navy named in honour of Admiral Nikolai Ottovich von Essen. The ship construction began at the Yantar Shipyard in Kaliningrad in July 2011, and it was launched in November 2014. It is based with the Black Sea Fleet, and was at Sevastopol in Crimea until October 2023, when it was transferred to Novorossiysk in Russia.

== Service ==
=== Russian military intervention in the Syrian civil war ===
In May and September 2017, in the course of the Russian military campaign in Syria, Admiral Essen fired Kalibr cruise missiles at targets in the Hama and Deir ez-Zor regions. On 25 August 2018, the Black Sea Fleet reported Admiral Essen, along with its sister ship Admiral Grigorovich, were making a "planned passage from Sevastopol to the Mediterranean Sea" to join the Russian Navy's Mediterranean task force.

=== 2022 Russian invasion of Ukraine ===
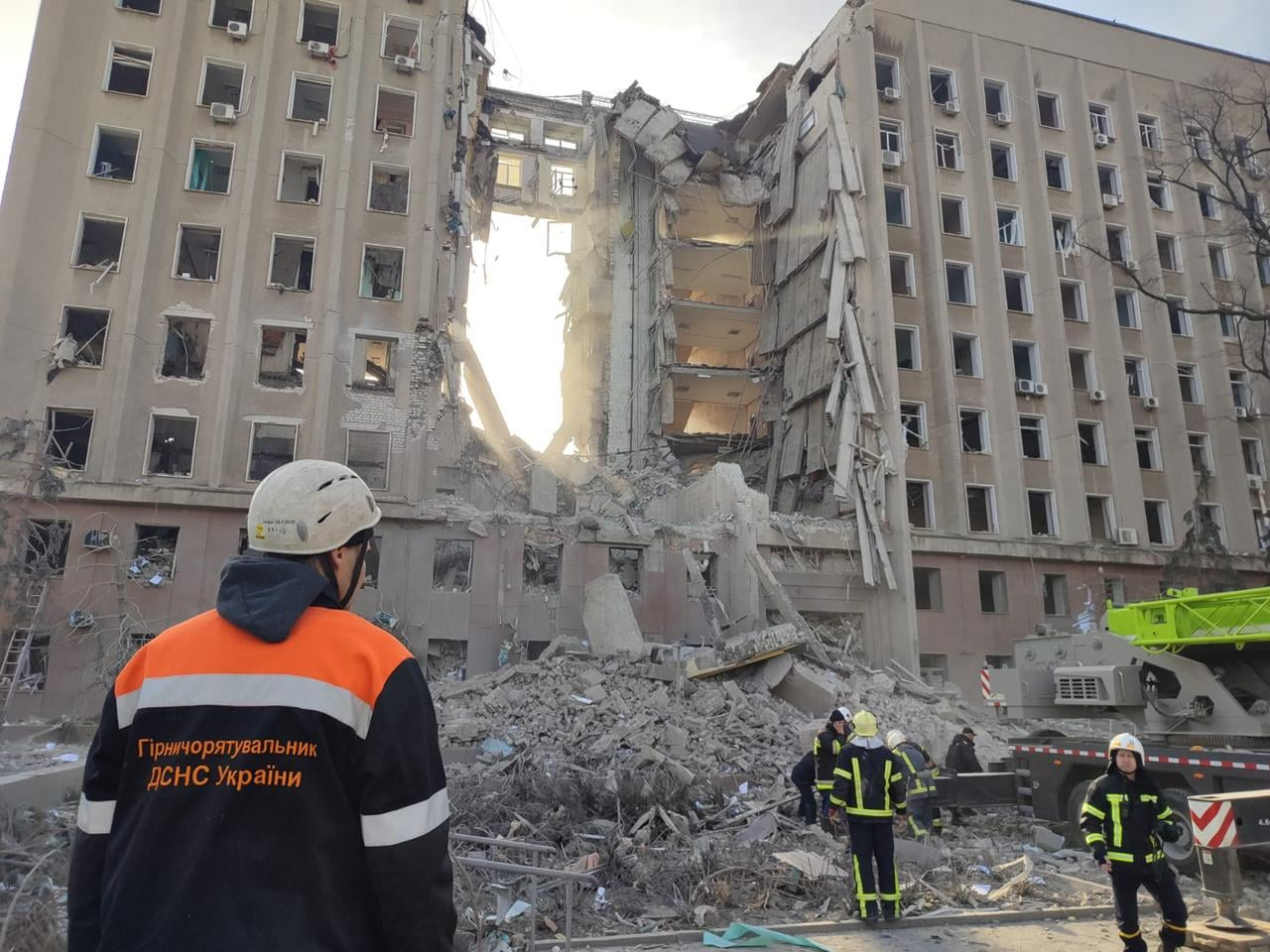
Mykolaiv regional council building partially destroyed by cruise missiles launched from Admiral Essen on 29 March 2022

During the 2022 Russian invasion of Ukraine the ship was involved in cruise missile strikes against Odesa. On 29 March 2022, two Kalibr cruise missiles launched from the ship destroyed the regional council building in Mykolaiv.

According to the Ukrainian President's Office, on 3 April 2022, the ship was allegedly seriously damaged by an attack using an initially unspecified weapon system, later reported as being a R-360 Neptune anti-ship cruise missile. According to Ukrainian accounts referring to this attack (without a date), the Neptune missile exploded close to the ship.

On 12 April 2022, the Russian Defence Ministry released a video showing Admiral Essen allegedly destroying a Ukrainian Bayraktar TB2 unmanned aerial vehicle (UAV) off the coast of Crimea, using two missiles of the Shtil-1 surface-to-air missile system. No video of an impact or wreckage was provided.

Sometime between 1 and 3 October 2023, Admiral Essen was transferred – along with Admiral Makarov – to Novorossiysk, Krasnodar Krai.

On 22 January 2026, in Moscow, the Second Western District Military Court formally accused Andrii Shubin, then commander of the 406th Artillery Brigade of the Ukrainian Navy, of damaging the frigate Admiral Essen on 2 April 2022 with a missile, injuring one person.

On 2 March 2026, Ukrainian drones struck Novorossiysk, damaging buildings and starting a fire at the Sheskharis oil terminal. Five Russian Navy vessels of the Black Sea Fleet were damaged, including the Admiral Essen, killing 3 sailors and wounding 16. The PK-10 decoy launchers were struck at midship. Also damaged were "TK-25 electronic warfare complex, the MR-90 "Orekh" target-illumination radars, and the Fregat-M2M surveillance radar".

On 6 March 2026, Ukraine's General Staff confirmed that two vessels of Russia's Black Sea Fleet, the Admiral Essen and Admiral Makarov frigates, had been damaged. Ukrainian sources reported that the ship had been attacked again in May 2026 and for a third time in the year, in conjunction with a large-scale Ukrainian drone assault on Novorossiysk, in August.

On 9 September 2026, Ukrainian drones struck the naval base at Novorossiysk, with fires being reported at the seaport's fuel oil terminal and naval base. The Admiral Essen was claimed to have been struck by a Neptune missile, starting a fire on the ship’s superstructure. Some reporting suggests that Admiral Essen remained operational though with limited ongoing repair options in the Black Sea.
