= INS Trishul =

The following ships of the Indian Navy have been named INS Trishul:

- INS Trishul (F143) was a Type 12, Whitby-class frigate commissioned in 1960, which served in the Portuguese-Indian War and the Indo-Pakistani War of 1971
- INS Trishul (F43) is a Talwar-class frigate, currently in active service with the Indian Navy
