= Russian frigate Admiral Makarov =

Frigate of the Admiral Grigorovich class

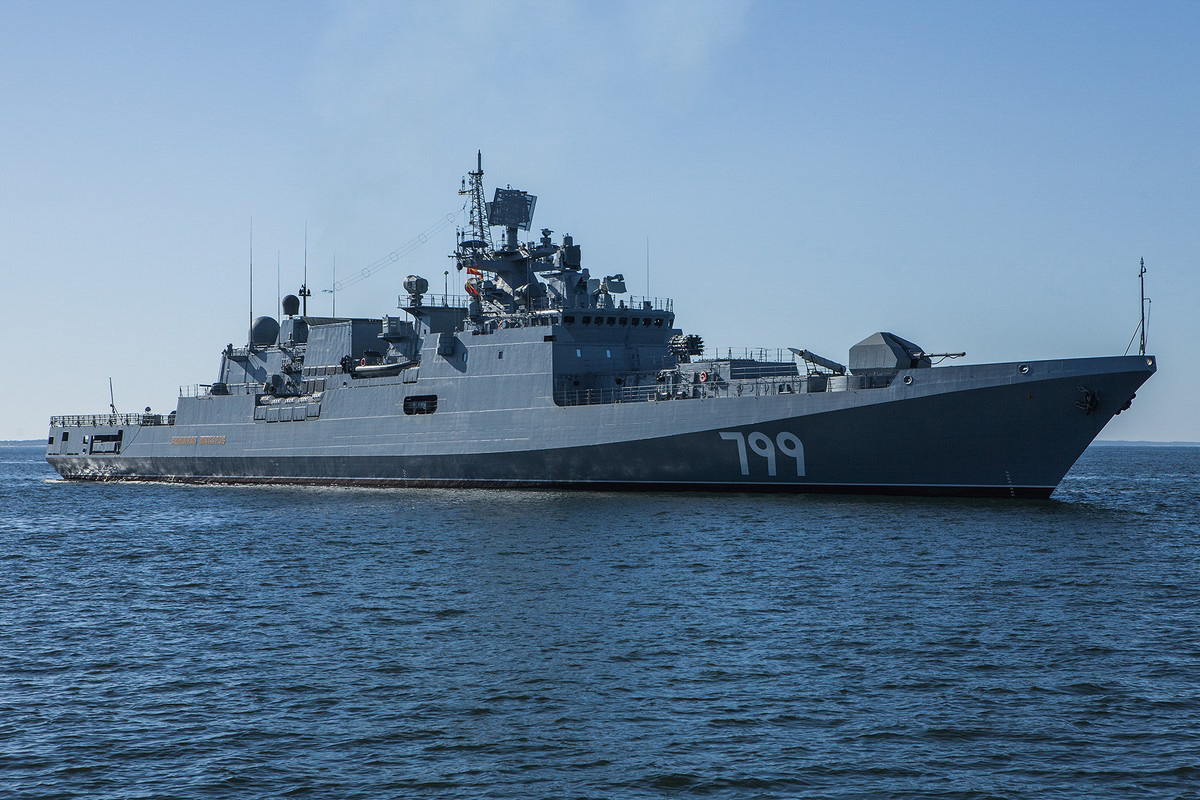
- Admiral Makarov

History

Russia
- Name: Admiral Makarov
- Namesake: Stepan Makarov
- Builder: Yantar Shipyard
- Laid down: 29 February 2012
- Launched: 2 September 2015
- Commissioned: 27 December 2017
- Status: Active

General characteristics
- Class & type: Admiral Grigorovich-class frigate
- Displacement: Standard: 3,620 tons; Full: 4,035 tons
- Length: 124.8 m (409 ft)
- Beam: 15.2 m (50 ft)
- Draught: 4.2 m (14 ft)
- Propulsion: 2 shaft COGAG; 2 DS-71 cruise gas turbines 8,450 shp (6,300 kW); 2 DT-59 boost gas turbines 22,000 shp (16,000 kW); Total: 60,900 shp (45,400 kW)
- Speed: 30 knots (56 km/h; 35 mph)
- Range: 4,850 nmi (8,980 km; 5,580 mi) at 14 kn (26 km/h; 16 mph)
- Endurance: 30 days
- Complement: 200
- Sensors & processing systems: Air search radar: Fregat M2M; Surface search radar: 3Ts-25 Garpun-B, MR-212/201-1, Nucleus-2 6000A; Fire control radar: JSC 5P-10 Puma FCS, 3R14N-11356 FCS, MR-90 Orekh SAM FCS
- Electronic warfare & decoys: EW Suite: TK-25-5; Countermeasures: 4 × KT-216
- Armament: 1 × 100 mm A-190 Arsenal naval gun; 8 (2 × 4) UKSK VLS cells for Kalibr, Oniks or Zircon anti-ship/cruise missiles; 24 (2 × 12) 3S90M VLS cells for 9M317M surface-to-air-missiles; 2 × AK-630 CIWS; 8 × Igla-S or Verba; 2 × double 533 mm torpedo tubes; 1 × RBU-6000 rocket launcher
- Aircraft carried: 1 × Ka-27 series helicopter
- Aviation facilities: Helipad and hangar for one helicopter

Admiral Makarov is an Admiral Grigorovich-class frigate of the Russian Navy, part of the Black Sea Fleet based at Sevastopol. She was laid down at the Yantar Shipyard in February 2012 and commissioned on 25 December 2017. She is the most recently built of her class, and the third of six ships that had been planned in the class as of November 2014.

== Service ==
In July 2018, the frigate took part in Russia's Main Naval Parade in St. Petersburg.

On 18 August 2018, Admiral Makarov set sail from the Baltic Sea for the Black Sea and sailed through the English Channel on 21 August. She had been spotted while in transit there by HMS Queen Elizabeth in the English Channel on 18 August during her maiden voyage. After shadowing the British supercarrier, Admiral Makarov arrived at her permanent base in Sevastopol in early October.

On 5 November 2018, the press service of the Russian Navy's Black Sea Fleet announced the frigate had left Sevastopol to join the Russian naval group in the eastern Mediterranean.

=== Russo-Ukraine War ===
In 2022, Admiral Makarov—along with Admiral Essen—took part in the Russian invasion of Ukraine, targeting a Ukrainian oil refinery and fuel depots in the suburbs of Odesa with cruise missiles.

Following the 14 April 2022 sinking of the cruiser Moskva, Admiral Makarov assumed the role of flagship of the Black Sea Fleet, and retained that role into 2026 during the Russo-Ukraine War.

On 6 May 2022, Ukrainian MP Oleksiy Honcharenko claimed that Admiral Makarov had been struck and badly damaged by a Ukrainian missile. On 7 May, the adviser to the Office of the President of Ukraine, Oleksiy Arestovych, said that the report was a "misunderstanding", and that the vessel attacked was actually a Serna-class landing craft. On 9 May, Admiral Makarov was spotted sailing intact near Sevastopol.

The Ukrainian Navy claims that, during a naval engagement, the 28th Naval Auxiliary Division ship Pochayiv managed to force Admiral Makarov to retreat. Admiral Makarov opened fire on Pochayiv using its 100 mm gun but missed the target due to the Ukrainian ship's movements. Admiral Makarov was much larger and better equipped but the crew of Pochayiv lured it into the range of Ukrainian coastal artillery forcing it to retreat to Sevastopol.

On 29 October 2022, Admiral Makarov may have been damaged during an attack on Sevastopol by several air and sea drones with at least one sea drone striking the ship, reportedly disabling the radar. Russian news agency TASS reported that all the air drones had been destroyed. Satellite footage from 1 November showed Admiral Grigorovich-class frigates believed to include Admiral Makarov moored at Sevastopol. Naval News subsequently reported that little damage had occurred to either of the two warships that were hit by the sea drones, but that the military effect of the attack on the protected harbor of Sevastopol exceeded the direct damage because it led to the Russian Navy going into a protective mode, "essentially locking them in port. New defenses were quickly added, new procedures imposed and there was much less activity. Russia's most powerful warships in the war [were by mid-November] mostly tied up in port."

On 1 December 2023, the frigate was given the honorary name of "Gvardiysky (Guardsman)". As of late 2024, the ship was reported active though having been relocated to the relatively greater safety of the eastern Black Sea.

Admiral Makarov was damaged again in a Ukrainian strike on 2 March 2026, along with Admiral Essen, in an attack at the Novorossiysk in the eastern Black Sea. By this time in the war, Novorossiysk had become the Black Sea Fleet’s primary base after repeated Ukrainian attacks had "forced Russia to abandon Sevastopol in Crimea as a safe harbor."

On 6 April, Ukraine's Unmanned Systems Forces announced that Admiral Makarov had been attacked again, with a video showing an Admiral Grigorovich-class frigate firing missiles as a drone approached. USF commander Robert Brovdi stated that battle damage assessment was being conducted to determine if the attack was successful. According to Ukrainian sources, fire on the ship lasted over 18 hours, and after-action battle damage assessments indicated significant internal damage as well as critical damage in its ability to use its Kalibr cruise missiles, leaving it unable to strike Ukrainian territory. The ship was reported to have been attacked again, in conjunction with a large-scale Ukrainian drone assault on Novorossiysk, in August 2026. Reporting subsequently suggested that Admiral Makarov remained operational though with limited options to repair damage given Ukraine's ability to target Black Sea infrastructure.
