= Severnoye Design Bureau =

Russian Ship Design Company

- Company type: Joint-stock company
- Industry: Shipbuilding
- Founded: 1946
- Headquarters: Saint Petersburg, Russia
- Parent: United Shipbuilding Corporation
- Website: www.severnoe.com

The Severnoe Design Bureau (Russian: Северное Проектно-Конструкторское Бюро, Severnoe Proyektno-Konstruktorsoye Byuro), founded in April 1946, is a Russian ship designing company. It is based in Saint Petersburg with an office in Moscow. Formerly, the bureau was known as the Northern Project Design Bureau (NPDB).

It is not to be confused with Severnaya Verf or Nevskoe Design Bureau, abbreviated as NDB. Those firms are also based in Saint Petersburg but have no relation whatsoever to the Severnoe DB.

The Severnoe Design Bureau is one of the leading designers of surface ships, mainly corvettes, frigates, cruisers, and destroyers. Over its 70-year-history, it has produced designs of some of the most powerful and advanced warships for the Soviet and Russian Navy, as well for foreign navies. It also produces civil designs, most notably LNG carriers.

== Some notable designs ==
- Kirov-class battlecruiser
- Slava-class cruiser
- Sovremennyy-class destroyer
- Talwar-class frigate
- Admiral Grigorovich-class frigate
- Admiral Gorshkov-class frigate
- Rubin-class patrol boat
