= Admiral Grigorovich-class frigate =

Russian class of frigates

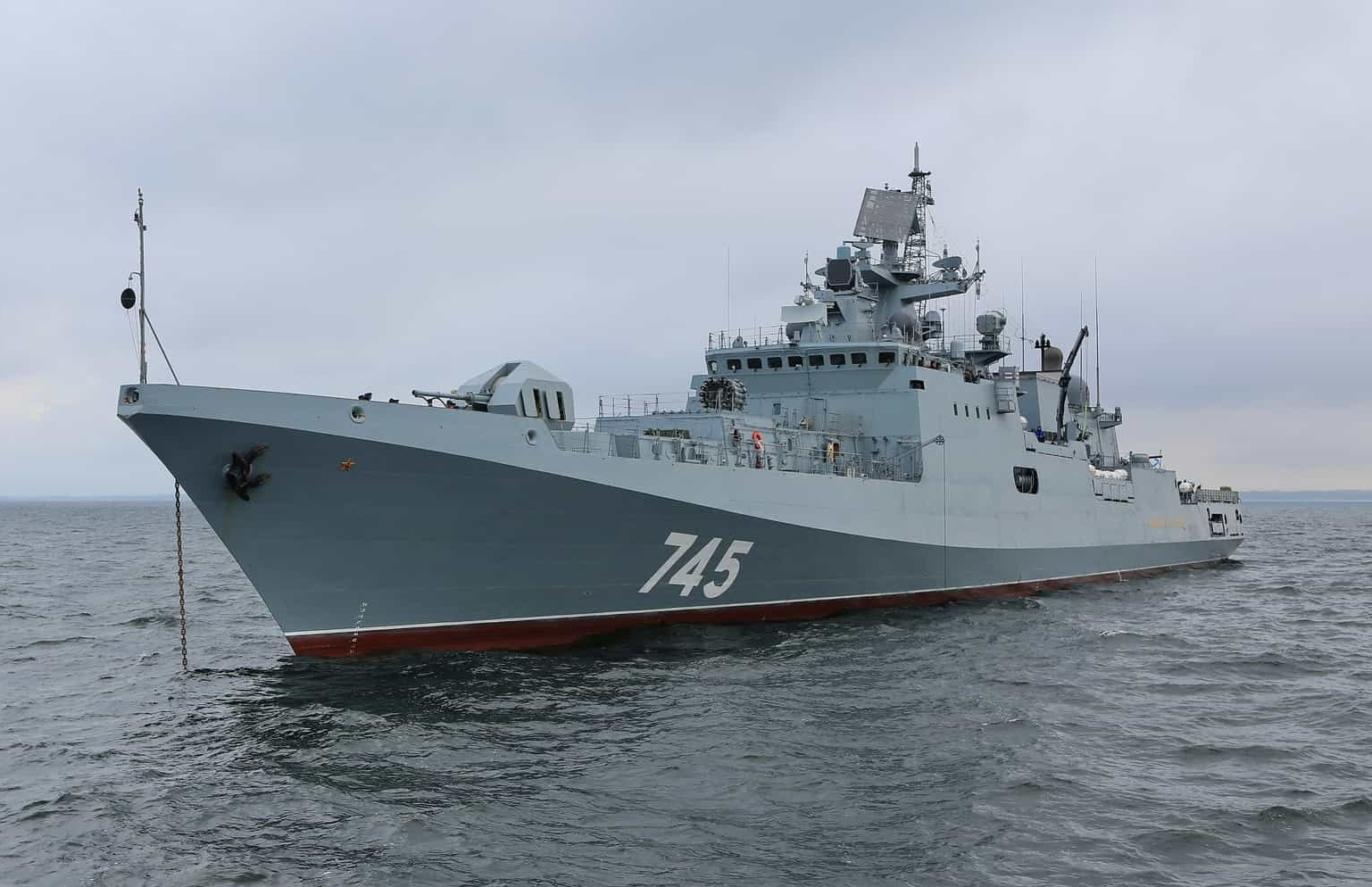
- Lead ship Admiral Grigorovich at anchor

Class overview
- Name: Admiral Grigorovich class
- Builders: Yantar Shipyard, Kaliningrad; Goa Shipyard
- Operators: Russian Navy
- Preceded by: Krivak class
- Subclasses: Talwar class
- Built: 2010–present
- In commission: 2016–present
- Planned: 6
- Building: 1
- Completed: 5
- Active: 5

General characteristics
- Type: Guided missile frigate
- Displacement: Standard: 3,620 tons; Full: 4,000 tons
- Length: 124.8 m (409 ft 5 in)
- Beam: 15.2 m (49 ft 10 in)
- Draught: 4.2 m (13 ft 9 in)
- Propulsion: 2 shaft COGAG; 2 DS-71 cruise gas turbines 8,450 shp (6,300 kW); 2 DT-59 boost gas turbines 22,000 shp (16,000 kW) ; Total: 60,900 shp (45,400 kW); or; 2 x M90FR FRU 20 (25/28) MW boost , 2 x cruise M70FRU-2 14 MW , 8 MW; Total: 56 – 68 MW
- Speed: 30 knots (56 km/h; 35 mph)
- Range: 4,850 nmi (8,980 km; 5,580 mi) at 14 knots (26 km/h; 16 mph)
- Endurance: 30 days
- Complement: 200
- Sensors & processing systems: Air search radar: Fregat M2M; Surface search radar: 3Ts-25 Garpun-B (Plank Shave), MR-212/201-1 (Palm Frond), Nucleus-2 6000A; Fire control radar: JSC 5P-10 Puma FCS, 3R14N-11356 FCS, MR-90 Orekh SAM FCS; Sonar: MGK-335EM-03 sonar system with Vinyetka-EM towed array
- Electronic warfare & decoys: EW suite: TK-25-5; Countermeasures: 4 × KT-216
- Armament: 1 × 100 mm A-190E-01 naval gun; 8 (2 × 4) UKSK VLS cells for Kalibr, Oniks or Tsircon cruise missiles; 8 BrahMos missiles for India variants; 24 (2 × 12) 3S90M Shtil-1 VLS cells for 9M317M/ME surface-to-air-missiles; 2 × AK-630 CIWS; 8 × Igla-S or Verba MANPADS; 2 × DTA-53-11356 twin-tube torpedo launchers; 1 × RBU-6000 rocket launcher
- Aircraft carried: 1 × Ka-27 series helicopter
- Aviation facilities: Helipad and hangar for one helicopter

The Admiral Grigorovich class (also referred to as Krivak V class), Russian designation Project 11356R, is a class of frigates built by the Yantar Shipyard in Kaliningrad for the Russian Navy and Indian Navy, with a cost of $450–500 million. Based on the Talwar class, six ships were ordered for the Russian Black Sea Fleet under two contracts in 2010 and 2011 as a complement to the Admiral Gorshkov-class frigates.

== History ==
By 2010–2011, it was decided the Russian Navy will procure six vessels based on the proven Talwar-class design, mainly due to repeated delays with production of Admiral Gorshkov frigates and because of the urgent need for new frigates necessary for modernization of the Black Sea Fleet. The Yantar Shipyard won the contract for construction of the frigates and three vessels were to be completed in four years. Previously, six ships of the same design, known as Talwar class, were built for the Indian Navy between 1999 and 2011 by the Baltic Shipyard, Saint Petersburg and Yantar Shipyard, Kaliningrad.

The lead ship, Admiral Grigorovich, was laid down on 18 December 2010 and was commissioned on 11 March 2016.

Initially, Ukrainian state-owned enterprise Zorya-Mashproekt was providing gas turbines for the Russian frigates, but after the start of the Russo-Ukrainian War in 2014, Ukraine said it would no longer supply the engines. Instead, Russian manufacturer Saturn was asked to supply alternative M90FR gas turbines.

Since October 2016, it was claimed the three incomplete frigates, Admiral Butakov, Admiral Istomin and Admiral Kornilov, the construction of which was suspended in 2015 due to Ukraine's refusal to supply gas turbine power plants, are considered to be sold to India. The Russian Navy has opposed this export.

On 1 June 2017, the United Shipbuilding Corporation (USC) announced that it would resume construction of the last three frigates in 2018 and that the ships would later join the Russian Navy. The decision to resume the work was made following the preliminary testing of latest Russian gas turbine engines, the M70FRU (14 MW) and M90FR (20 MW, maximal 25-28 MW), designed and built by NPO Saturn plant. With an access to alternative power plants, the ships were believed to remain in Russian service. In December 2017, NPO Saturn has successfully completed three R&D projects of the M90FR, Agregat-DKVP and M70FRU-R gas engines held since 2014.

However, on 20 October 2018, a decision was made to sell the unfinished frigates Admiral Butakov and Admiral Istomin to the Indian Navy under a contract worth US$950 million. The Yantar Shipyard in Kaliningrad will carry all necessary works to finish the frigates, before they will be handed over to India in first half of 2024. As of 2021, it had still to be confirmed whether Admiral Kornilov would be completed for the Russian Navy or potentially sold to a foreign customer. Later in 2021 it was reported that she would in fact be sold to a foreign customer.

On 17 August 2022, deputy head of United Shipbuilding Corporation Vladimir Korolev stated that the Yantar Shipyard is ready to build more Admiral Grigorovich-class frigates. He also stated that the fate of the sixth, incomplete frigate, Admiral Kornilov, has not yet been decided.

== Operational history ==
=== Russian intervention in Syria ===
On 3 November 2016, as part of Russian military intervention in the Syrian Civil War, Admiral Grigorivich was deployed to the Mediterranean Sea for the first time. On 15 November 2016, it launched Kalibr cruise missiles on IS and Al-Nusra targets in Syria's Idlib and Homs provinces, destroying ammunition warehouses, gathering and training centers and weapon production plants. Admiral Grigorovich was redeployed to the Mediterranean Sea in April 2017, following the US missile strikes against Syria. She joined the Mediterranean squadron again on 24 December 2020.

=== Russian invasion of Ukraine ===
Being deployed as part of the Black Sea Fleet, the Russian ships of the Admiral Grigorovich class were in the theatre of operations at the start of the war. Video uploaded to the internet from Odessa on 21 March 2022 shows two Russian vessels engaging in shelling near the coast of Odessa, with one of these ships identified as an unknown Admiral Grigorovich–class ship.

On 12 April 2022, a Grigorovich-class frigate reportedly shot down a Bayraktar TB2 drone during the 2022 Russian invasion of Ukraine. On 22 April a Grigorovich-class frigate reportedly fired Kalibr cruise missiles against Ukrainian targets.

It was noted in June 2023 that the Russian Navy had started painting disruptive grey and black ship camouflage onto their ships, with both the Admiral Essen and Admiral Makarov receiving this pattern (though it was later removed from the Essen). Ukraine claims to have targeted and hit the Admiral Essen and/or the Admiral Makarov on 1 and 2 March 2026 with drone strikes and to have damaged them.

=== 2026 English Channel incident ===
It was reported on 16 June 2026 that the Admiral Grigorovich had fired warning shots at a yacht in the English Channel between Normandy and the Isle of Wight.

== Export ==
As part of the deal signed on 20 October 2018 for delivery of Admiral Butakov and Admiral Istomin frigates to the Indian Navy, Rosoboronexport and Goa Shipyard have signed an additional contract for two more Admiral Grigorovich-class frigates to be license-built at Goa Shipyard in India. Under the contract, Russia will provide India the technological know-how to build the frigates on its own. The final cost for the two vessels is yet to be determined, but was estimated at US$500 million for the foreign content. The Indian Navy should receive the ships in 2026 and 2027, respectively.

== Ships ==
Name	Namesake	Builder	Laid down	Launched	Commissioned	Fleet	Status
Russian Navy
Admiral Grigorovich	Ivan Konstantinovich Grigorovich	Yantar, Kaliningrad	18 December 2010	14 March 2014	11 March 2016	Black Sea	Admiral Grigorovich on active duty, conducting escort missions between Mediterranean and Baltic in 2026. Ukraine conducted several strikes on Admiral Essen and Admiral Makarov in Novorossiysk port March-August 2026; Admiral Essen claimed to have been struck again in September 2026; some reporting suggests that the ships remain operational though with limited ongoing repair options.
Admiral Essen	Nikolai Ottovich Essen	Yantar, Kaliningrad	8 July 2011	7 November 2014	7 June 2016	Black Sea	Admiral Grigorovich on active duty, conducting escort missions between Mediterranean and Baltic in 2026. Ukraine conducted several strikes on Admiral Essen and Admiral Makarov in Novorossiysk port March-August 2026; Admiral Essen claimed to have been struck again in September 2026; some reporting suggests that the ships remain operational though with limited ongoing repair options.
Admiral Makarov	Stepan Osipovich Makarov	Yantar, Kaliningrad	29 February 2012	2 September 2015	27 December 2017	Black Sea	Admiral Grigorovich on active duty, conducting escort missions between Mediterranean and Baltic in 2026. Ukraine conducted several strikes on Admiral Essen and Admiral Makarov in Novorossiysk port March-August 2026; Admiral Essen claimed to have been struck again in September 2026; some reporting suggests that the ships remain operational though with limited ongoing repair options.
Indian Navy
INS Tushil (ex-Admiral Butakov)		Yantar, Kaliningrad	13 July 2013	Original launch 5 March 2016; Relaunched 28 October 2021	9 December 2024	Western	Commissioned
INS Tamal (ex-Admiral Istomin)		Yantar, Kaliningrad	15 November 2013	Original launch 16 November 2017	1 July 2025	Western	Commissioned
Unidentified customer
(ex-Admiral Kornilov)		Yantar, Kaliningrad		Original launch 16 November 2017	by 2026		Under construction, to be sold abroad

== See also ==
- List of ships of Russia by project number
- List of frigate classes in service

Equivalent frigates of the same era

- Valour class
- Incheon class
- Type 054
- Absalon class
- Fridtjof Nansen class
- Formidable class
