= INS Trishul (F43) =

Talwar-class frigate

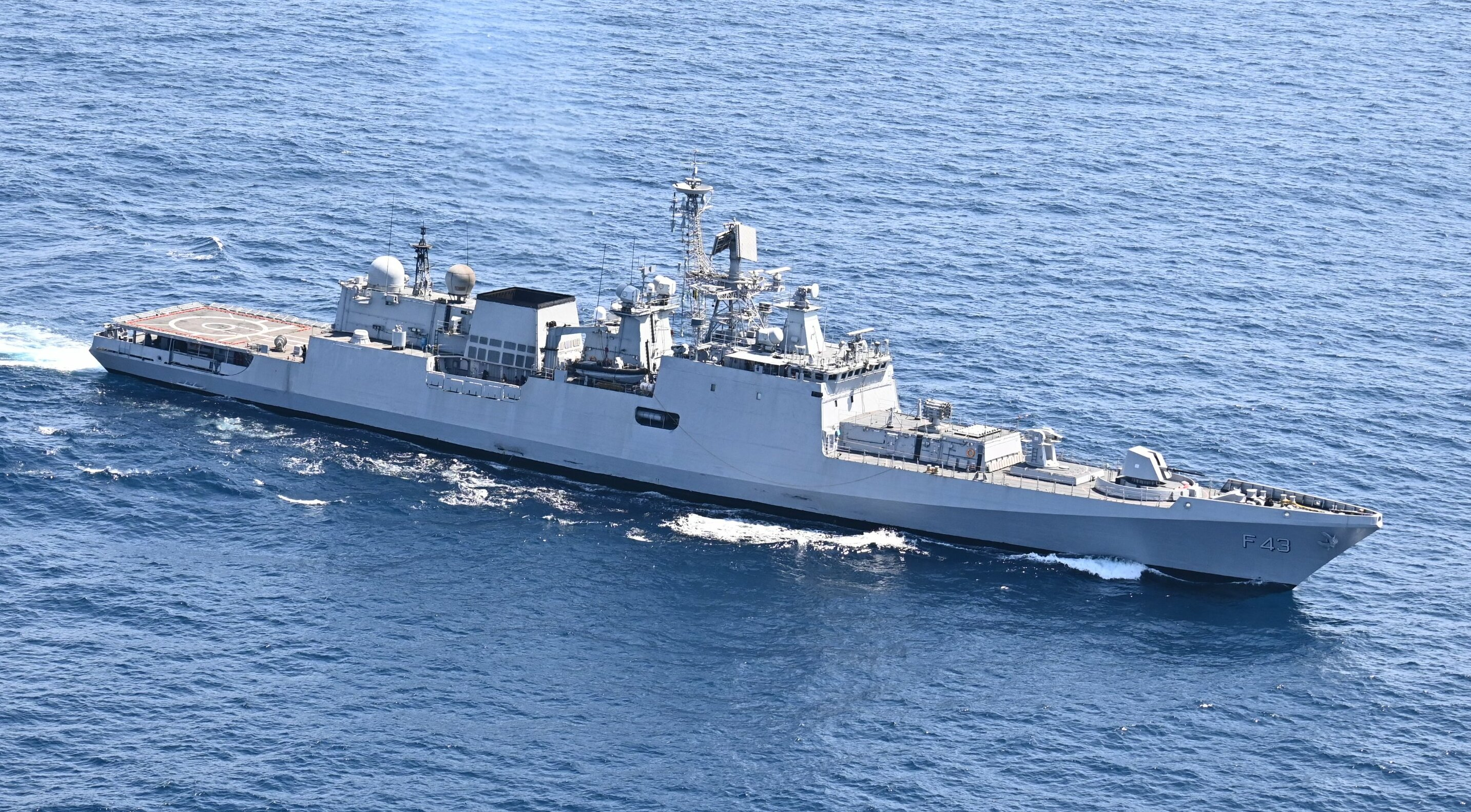
- INS Trishul on a joint EEZ patrol with Tanzanian Navy

History

India
- Name: INS Trishul
- Namesake: "Trident"
- Ordered: 17 November 1997
- Builder: Baltiysky Zavod
- Laid down: 24 September 1999
- Launched: 24 November 2000
- Commissioned: 25 June 2003
- Status: in active service

General characteristics
- Class & type: Talwar-class frigate
- Displacement: 3620 tons (standard); 4035 tons (full)
- Length: 124.8 m (409 ft)
- Beam: 15.2 m (50 ft)
- Draught: 4.5 m (15 ft)
- Propulsion: 2 × DS-71 cruise turbines; 2 × DT-59 boost turbines
- Speed: 30 knots (56 km/h; 35 mph)
- Range: 4,850 nautical miles (8,980 km; 5,580 mi) at 14 knots (26 km/h; 16 mph); 1,600 nautical miles (3,000 km; 1,800 mi) at 30 knots (56 km/h; 35 mph)
- Complement: 180 (18 Officers)
- Sensors & processing systems: 1 × 3Ts-25E Garpun-B surface search radar; 1 × MR-212/201-1 navigation radar; 1 × Kelvin Hughes Nucleus-2 6000A radar; 1 × Ladoga-ME-11356 intertial navigation and stabilisation; 1 × Fregat M2EM 3D circular scan radar; 1 × Ratep JSC 5P-10E Puma fire-control system; 1 × 3R14N-11356 fire-control system FCS; 4 × MR-90 Orekh; BEL HUMSA (Hull Mounted Sonar Array)
- Electronic warfare & decoys: 1 × TK-25E-5 EWS; 1 × PK-10 ship-borne decoy launching systems; 4 × KT-216 decoy launchers
- Armament: Anti-air missiles: 24 × Shtil-1 medium range missiles; 8 × Igla-1E (SA-16); Anti-ship/Land-attack missiles: 8 × VLS launched Klub, anti-ship cruise missiles; Guns: 1 × OTO Melara 76 mm gun; 2 × AK-630 CIWS; Anti-submarine warfare: 2 × 2 533 mm (21.0 in) torpedo tubes; 1 × RBU-6000 (RPK-8) rocket launcher
- Aircraft carried: 1 Ka-28 Helix-A, Ka-31 Helix B or HAL Dhruv

INS Trishul (F43) (lit. 'Trident') is the second frigate of the Talwar class of the Indian Navy. Trishul, the guided missile frigate, joined the arsenal of Indian Navy in 2003. The ship was commissioned by the then Flag Officer Commanding-in-Chief, Western Naval Command Vice Admiral Arun Prakash at St. Petersburg, Russia on 25 June 2003. It has a complement of 32 officers and 228 sailors. In contrast to the lead ship INS Talwar, the sea trials of Trishul were considerably shortened as the ship performed well. Trishul arrived in Mumbai on 23 September 2003.

== Design ==
Trishul belongs to the Talwar-class of frigates. The Talwar-class guided missile frigates are modified Krivak III-class frigates built by Russia. These ships use stealth technologies and a special hull design to ensure a reduced radar cross section. Much of the equipment on the ship is Russian-made, but a significant number of systems of Indian origin have also been incorporated.

== Armament ==
The surface to air weapons systems include one single-rail MS-196 launcher that can launch the long range Shtil-1 (NATO: SA-17) surface-to-air missile. Eight Igla-1E (NATO: SA-16) portable air defence missiles are on board for short-range threats. Trishul became the second Indian warship to incorporate an eight cell KBSM 3S-14NE Vertical Launcher and was the first to upload the new Indian/Russian designed missile, the supersonic BrahMos PJ-10 AShCM (anti-sub/ship/surface cruise missile). Trishul's VLS can launch the Russian designed 3M-54E Klub-N (NATO: SS-N-27) subsonic ASCM. Trishul has one OTO Melara 76 mm naval gun, which replaced a 100 mm A-190E dual purpose gun mount for surface and air targets.

Two AK-630 CIWS systems are also present on the Trishul, and replace older Kashtan Air Defence Gun/Missile mounts. The Kashtan CIWS has two GSh-30K 30mm Gatling guns per mount firing 5,000 rounds a minute, along with eight 9M-311 Grison missiles (NATO: SA-N-11) with a range of 8 kilometres (5.0 mi). There are 64 Grison reloads (32 each mount) with a package of four missile taking less than 2 minutes to load. Forward of Trishul's bridge and aft of the VLS is one 12-round RBU-6000 anti-submarine warfare rocket launch that can fire either Splav-90R rockets or RGB-60 depth charges. Two pairs of fixed 533 mm DTA-53 torpedo tubes are located port and starboard midships. Both can launch either SET-65E anti-sub and 53-65KE antiship torpedoes.

== Service history ==
In December 2005, Trishul collided with a commercial ship, Ambuja Laxmi, outside the Mumbai harbour, while returning from a training mission. Radar systems installed by the port authorities and those on board Ambuja Laxmi were unable to detect Trishul, and were unable to prevent the side-on collision.

In the later part of 2017, Trishul was deployed on a four-month long anti piracy mission in the region of Gulf of Aden. The ship started at Mumbai in August 2017, and returned on 23 December 2017. During the period, the ship covered 26,000 nautical miles (48,000 km; 30,000 mi), carried out a bilateral exercise with the Italian Navy, exchange visits with the navies of Italy, Russia, United States, Japan, and Bangladesh. On 06 October 2017, Trishul successfully deterred a pirate attack on an Indian merchant vessel, MV Jag Amar.

On 29 March 2024, INS Sumedha intercepted an Iranian fishing vessel FV Al-Kambar 786 which was hijacked by nine armed pirates 90 nautical miles off the coast of Socotra islands, Yemen in Indian Ocean. The ship was later joined by INS Trishul. The crew, consisting of 23 Pakistani nationals, were rescued in a 12-hour long operation. They were later brought to Mumbai on April 3, were they will be Arrested and held for further legal action.

From 14 to 17 September 2026, INS Trishul conducted a port call at Alexandria Port in Egypt as part of her deployment. Trishul was escorted by ENS Al-Qadeer of the Egyptian Navy. The visit concuded with a Passage Exercise (PASSEX) with ENS Bernees. On 22 September, Trishul called at Toulon, France to represent the Indian Navy in the 24th edition of Exercise Varuna with the French Navy. On 30 September, Trishul reached Port of Valencia in Spain. She took part in Exercise Konkan 2026 with the Royal Navy from 8 to 15 October in two phases. The sea phase took place from 12 October onwards where Trishul operated with HMS Sutherland (F81) of the Royal Navy. The exercise was conducted by the Fleet Operational Standards and Training. Trishul arrived at the Port of Civitavecchia, Italy on 25 October following a PASSEX with ITS Carlo Margottini (F 592). She departed Italy on 28 October.
