= 9K333 Verba =

Russian man-portable surface-to-air missile

Verba
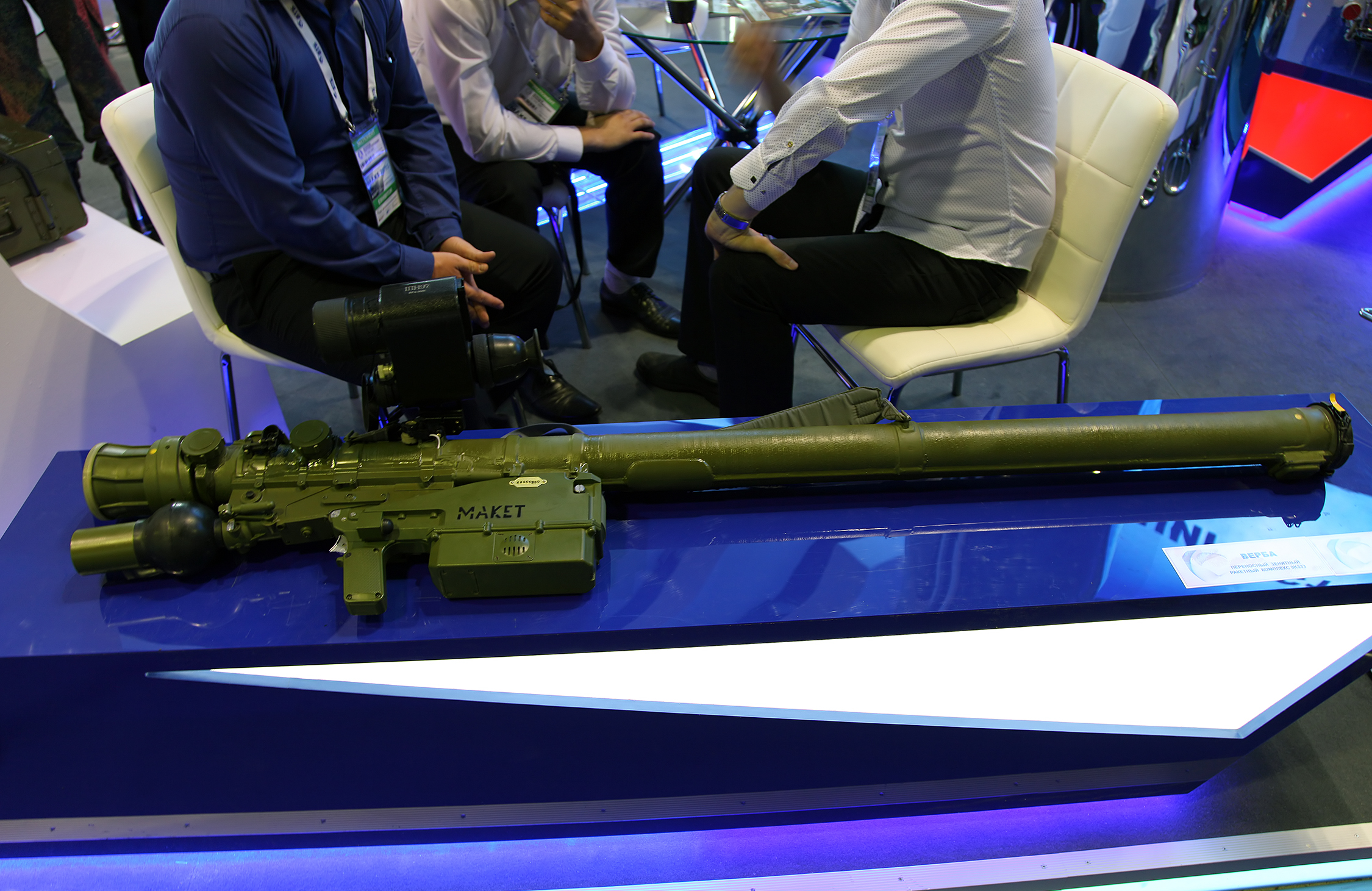
- Type: Man-portable air-defense systems (MANPADS)
- Place of origin: Russia

Service history
- In service: 2014–present
- Used by: See Operators
- Wars: Syrian Civil War; Russo–Ukrainian war

Production history
- Manufacturer: KB Mashinostroyeniya - developer of the system
- Produced: 2011–present

Specifications
- Mass: 17.25 kg (38.0 lb)
- Diameter: 72 mm
- Warhead: 1.5 kg (3.3 lb)
- Engine: Solid fuel rocket motor
- Operational range: 6.5 km (21,000 ft)
- Flight ceiling: 4.5 km (15,000 ft)
- Maximum speed: Up to 500 m/s (Mach 1.5)
- Guidance system: Three-channel optical seeker (ultraviolet, near-infrared, mid-infrared)

The 9K333 Verba (Russian: Верба, "Willow") is a Russian fourth-generation man-portable infrared homing surface-to-air missile (SAM) MANPADS. "9K333" is the Russian GRAU designation of the system. Its NATO reporting name is SA-29 Gizmo.

== History ==
The 9K333 Verba was originally developed as a replacement for the 9K38 Igla.

The Verba's primary new feature is its multispectral optical seeker, using three sensors – ultraviolet, near infrared, and mid-infrared – as opposed to the Igla-S' two. Cross-checking sensors against one another better discriminates between relevant targets and decoys, and decreases the chance of disruption from countermeasures, including lasers that attempt to blind missiles.

According to a KBM spokesperson, the Verba can engage fixed- and rotary-wing aircraft and “new types of threats” such as unmanned aerial vehicles and cruise missiles. “The 9K333 can effectively engage aerial targets with low infrared signature. The system can be coupled to an external identification friend or foe [IFF] unit,” the spokesperson said.

The Verba's containerised 9M336 surface-to-air missile (SAM) can be integrated into ground- and sea-based short-range air-defence (SHORAD) systems. “The SAM can also be used by air platforms,” the spokesperson added.

As of mid-2026, it is issued alongside the Zarnitsa thermal sighting system.

== Production ==
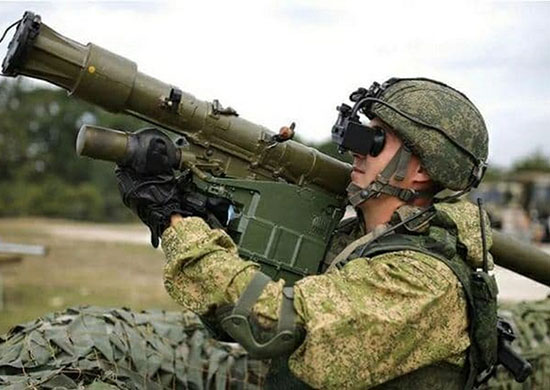
Anti-aircraft gunner of the Russian military base in Tajikistan with the "Verba" MANPADS

The system is in serial production for the Russian Armed Forces, with several ground forces and airborne formations receiving Verbas since 2014. It first appeared with the Ivanovo VDV division after passing Army testing in the summer of 2011 and being confirmed for production in late 2011. As of 2015, KBM has equipped the Russian army with three brigade and two divisional sets. Four VDV units received Verba in 2014–15. MANPADS "Verba" passed state tests in 2011. Officially, it entered service in 2015. KBM signed a long-term contract with the Russian Ministry of Defense to supply Verba and carries out its production. As of April 2017, 10 sets had been delivered, with 801 systems delivered as of November the same year. Deliveries continue.

In 2026, the Financial Times obtained transaction documents from a sale of Verba missiles from Rosoboronexport to Iran. The price was €170,000 per 9M336 missile and €40,000 per launcher.

India's Adani Defence is expected to collaborate for the missile's production for the Indian Armed Forces. A purchase contract worth ₹1,800 crore (US$190 million) is also reportedly in the final stages. The Indian firm was nominated in August 2026 in a singe-vendor situation and was given an exemption from the authorities from a competitive bidding.

== Service ==
=== Syrian Civil War ===
In 2017, Russian forces were deployed with Verba MANPADS in the eastern Ghouta region near Damascus for the protection of the capital city against drones operated by insurgents of Hayat Tahrir al-Sham.

== Operators ==
- Armenia – Quantity of 9K333 Verba yet unknown. (Armenian and Russian sources)
- Iran – To be delivered starting 2027 through 2029
- Russia

=== Potential operator ===
- India – A purchase contract worth ₹1,800 crore (US$190 million) is reportedly in the final stages as of September 2026, to be co-produced in India by Adani Defence.
