= Zorya-Mashproekt =

Ukrainian gas turbine production complex

Coordinates: 46.933335°N 32.049137°E

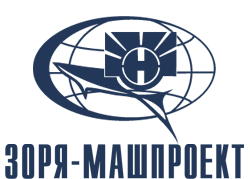
ZM turbine logo

Logo of the State concern Ukrainian Defense Industry

Zorya-Mashproekt (Ukrainian: ДП НВКГ «Зоря» — «Машпроект») is a research and production complex that specializes in a gas turbine construction. The complex is located in the city of Mykolaiv, Ukraine and is part of the Ukrainian Defense Industries (Ukroboronprom) state corporation.

== History ==
The idea of creating a factory in production of steam turbines in Ukraine arose soon after World War II. On 9 July 1946 the Soviet government adopted a decision on establishing of the factory in Mykolaiv, while the city authorities found a spot in the southeastern suburbs of the city near a military airfield Kulbakine. The preparatory works started out in March 1948, while the construction stretched out for the next five years. Initially the factory was called the Southern Turbine Plant.

Following the annexation of Crimea by the Russian Federation, the Ukrainians refused to supply the Russian Navy with marine gas turbines from Zorya-Mashproekt, and so NPO Saturn has been commissioned to design new engines for the Admiral Gorshkov and Admiral Grigorovich-class frigates.

During the Russian invasion of Ukraine, the factory began assembling anti-tank hedgehog barriers to assist in the defense of Mykolaiv. Employees formed a territorial defense unit to maintain law and order within the factory. The factory was shelled on 13 March.

Bharat Forge, an Indian company, bought a 51% share in Zorya Mashproekt India Private Limited. On 9 May 2023, Kalyani Strategic Systems, which is fully owned by Bharat Forge, signed the acquisition agreement. The acquisition process was finished on 31 December 2023.

== See also ==
- FC Torpedo Mykolaiv
- Ivchenko-Progress
- Russian destroyer Admiral Levchenko
