= Yantar Shipyard =

Shipyard in Kaliningrad, Russia

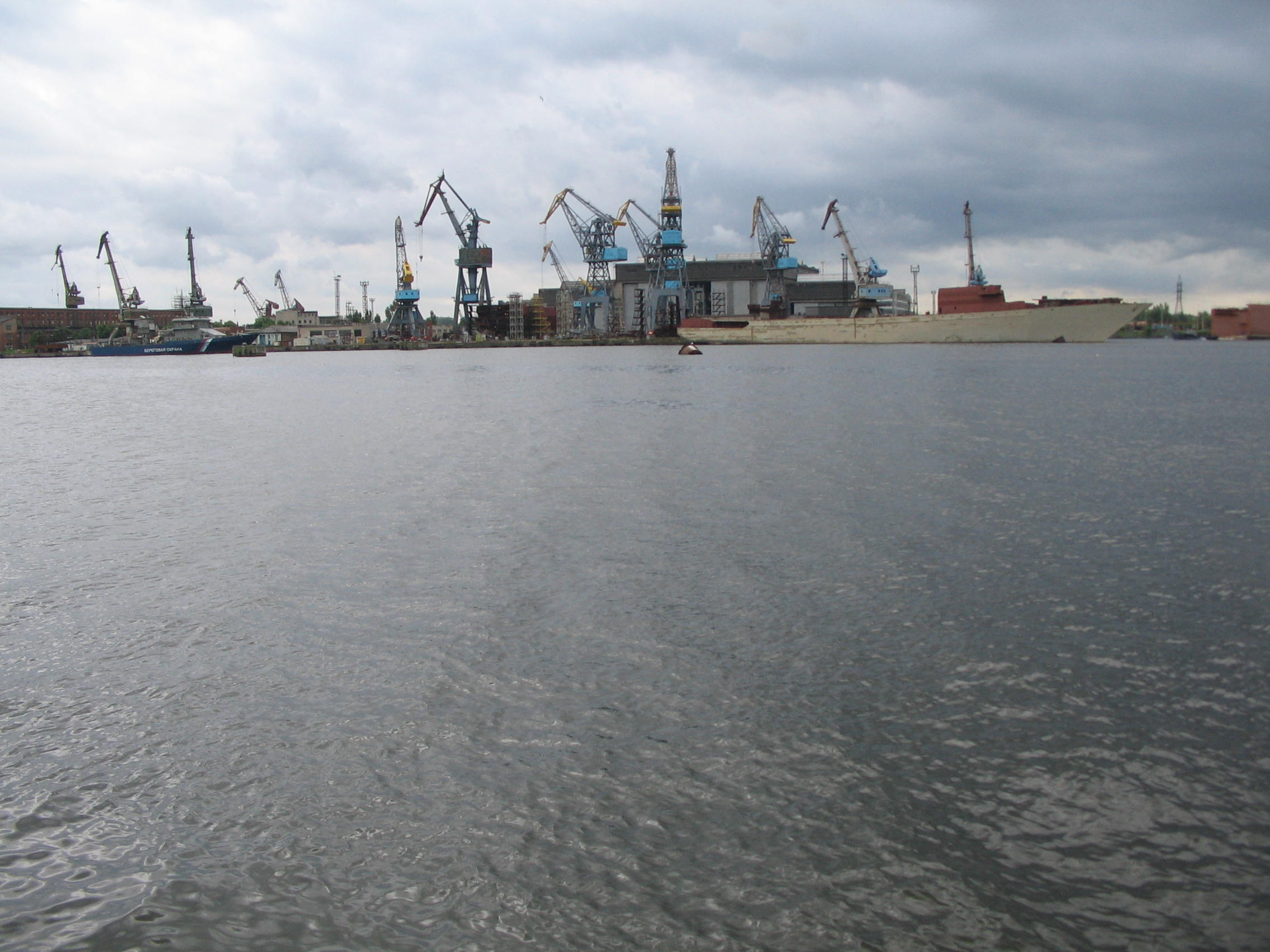
- Company type: Joint-stock company
- Founded: 1945
- Headquarters: Kaliningrad, Russia
- Revenue: $162 million (2017)
- Net income: −$7.23 million (2017)
- Total assets: $1.08 billion (2017)
- Total equity: $62.9 million (2017)
- Parent: United Shipbuilding Corporation
- Website: www.shipyard-yantar.ru

Yantar Shipyard (Russian: Прибалтийский судостроительный завод «Янтарь») is a Russian shipbuilding company based in Kaliningrad, Russia.

Yantar Shipyard builds military ships, including antisubmarine and patrol craft, as well as civil vessels such as fishing trawlers and seiners. It is a part of the United Shipbuilding Corporation. Before 1945, it was the Königsberg unit of the German Schichau-Werke shipbuilding company.

The shipyard's facilities allow it to construct vessels of up to 20,000 tonnes DWT. Between 1945 and 2010 it has built more than 100 large and 400 small civilian ships.

== History ==
Before 1945, the shipyard was the Königsberg unit of the German Schichau-Werke shipbuilding company.

Following World War II, the shipyard was absorbed into the Soviet state enterprise and operated as a government shipyard.

Sometime following the Dissolution of the Soviet Union in 1991, the shipyard became a part of the Russian state corporation United Shipbuilding Corporation.

=== 2010s, Project 11356 ===
In the early 2010s the shipyard started a series labeled Project 11356 for the Indian Navy. The lead frigate under the name Admiral Grigorovich was laid down in mid-December 2010 and was expected to be ready in November 2014. As of 2014, a total of six ships (including the Admiral Essen, the Admiral Makarov, the Admiral Butakov, the Admiral Istomin and the Admiral Kornikov) were slated to join the Black Sea Fleet by 2017.

The Admiral Butikov (serial number 01360) was launched on 2 March 2016. The Admiral Istomin (serial number 01361) and the Admiral Kornikov (serial number 01362) were launched in 2H2017, "mainly to make room in the construction dry docks", but had no superstructures and the hulls were incomplete. The construction of the second group of three frigates was suspended in 2017 by the Russian Navy due to absence of the gas-turbine power plants, which were originally ordered from a Ukrainian supplier. Although the Russian state United Shipbuilding Corporation had said in 2015 that the frigates would have Russian-made engines, Russia was unable to provide those in time.
