= Soviet frigate Silnyy =

Krivak-class frigate

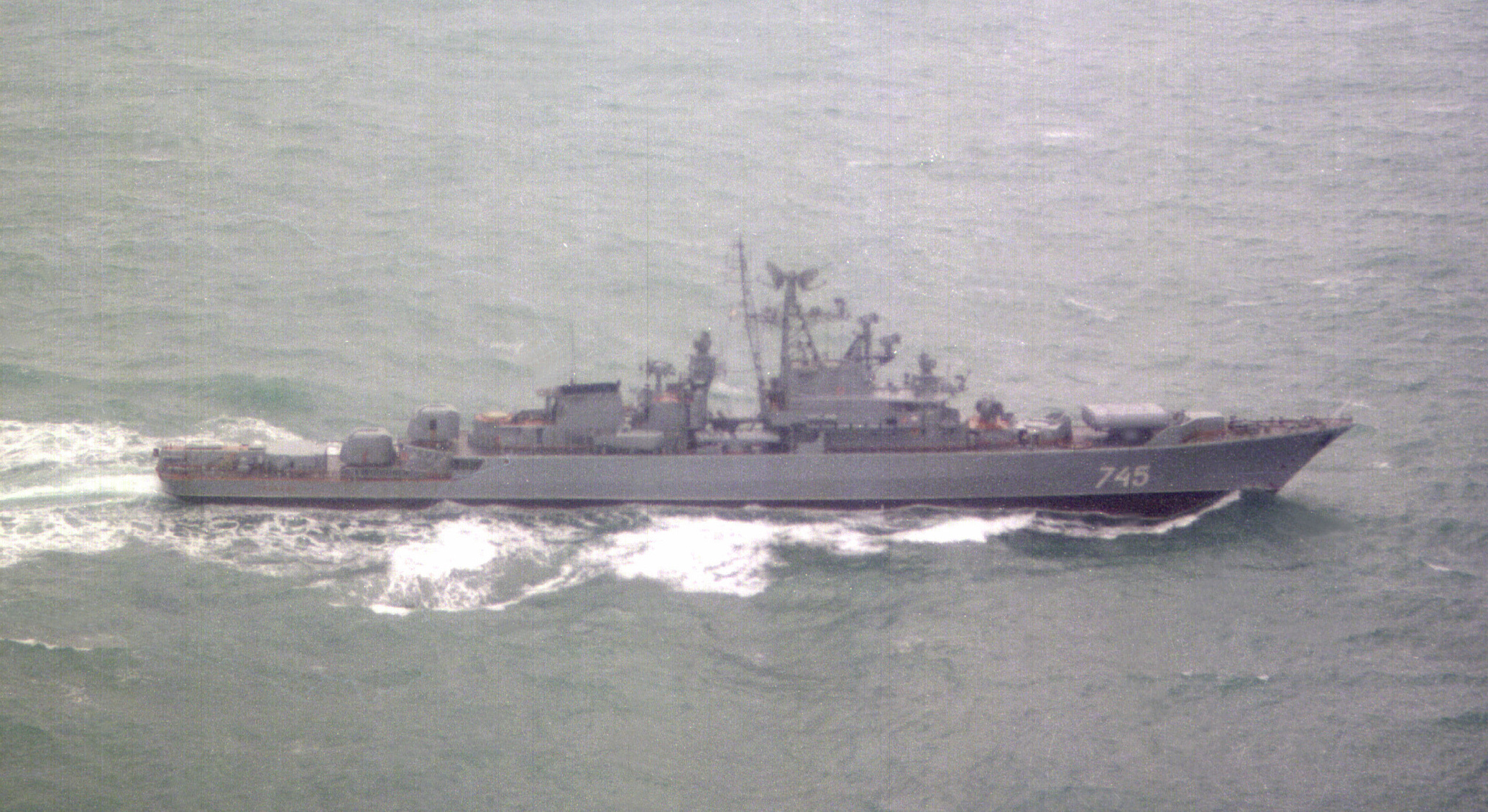
- Silnyy underway on 1 October 1985

History

Soviet Union
- Name: Silnyy
- Namesake: Russian for Strong
- Builder: Yantar Shipyard, Kaliningrad
- Yard number: 154
- Laid down: 15 March 1971
- Launched: 29 August 1972
- Commissioned: 30 June 1973
- Decommissioned: 30 June 1994
- Fate: Broken up

General characteristics
- Class & type: Project 1135 Burevestnik frigate
- Displacement: 2,810 t (2,770 long tons) (standard); 3,200 t (3,100 long tons) (full load)
- Length: 123 m (403 ft 7 in)
- Beam: 14.2 m (46 ft 7 in)
- Draft: 4.5 m (14 ft 9 in)
- Installed power: 48,000 shp (36,000 kW)
- Propulsion: 4 gas turbines; COGAG; 2 shafts
- Speed: 32 knots (59 km/h; 37 mph)
- Range: 3,950 nmi (7,315 km; 4,546 mi) at 14 knots (26 km/h; 16 mph)
- Complement: 23 officers, 174 ratings
- Sensors & processing systems: MR-310A Angara-A air/surface search radar; Volga and Don navigational radars; MG-332 Titan-2 and MG-325 Vega sonars
- Electronic warfare & decoys: PK-16 decoy-dispenser system
- Armament: 4 × URPK-3 Metel (SS-N-14 'Silex') anti-submarine missiles (1×4); 4 × ZIF-122 4K33 launchers (2×2) with 40 4K33 OSA-M (SA-N-4 'Gecko') surface-to-air missiles; 4 × 76 mm (3 in) AK-726 guns (2×2); 2 × 45 mm (1.8 in) 21-KM guns (2×1); 2 × RBU-6000 Smerch-2 anti-submarine rockets; 8 × 533 mm (21 in) torpedo tubes (2×4); 18 mines

Silnyy or Silny (Russian: Сильный, "Strong") was a Soviet Navy Project 1135 Burevestnik-class Large Anti-Submarine Ship (Большой Противолодочный Корабль, BPK) or Krivak-class frigate. Displacing 3,200 tonnes (3,100 long tons; 3,500 short tons) full load, the vessel was built around the Metel anti-submarine missile system. Launched on 29 August 1972, Silnyy served with the Baltic Fleet. The vessel undertook a number of visits to nations friendly to the Soviet Union, including Cape Verde, Cuba, East Germany and Poland. In 1976, while escorting the aircraft carrier Kiev, the ship had a close encounter with the cruiser USS Josephus Daniels, although neither vessel was damaged. Silnyy was taken out of service for repairs in 1990. However, lack of funds meant that, instead, the ship was decommissioned on 30 June 1994 and broken up.

== Design and development ==
Silnyy was one of twenty-one Project 1135 Burevestnik (Russian: Буревестник, "Petrel")-class ships launched between 1970 and 1981. Project 1135 was envisaged by the Soviet Navy as a less expensive complement to the Project 1134A Berkut A (NATO reporting name 'Kresta II') and Project 1134B Berkut B (NATO reporting name 'Kara') classes of anti-submarine cruisers, called Large Anti-Submarine Ships (Большой Противолодочный Корабль, BPK) by the Soviets.

The design was originally given to the TsKB-340 design bureau of Zelenodolsk, which had created the earlier Project 159 (NATO reporting name 'Petya') and Project 35 (NATO reporting name 'Mirka') classes. However, the expansion in the United States Navy ballistic missile submarine fleet and the introduction of longer-ranged and more accurate submarine-launched ballistic missiles led the Soviet Navy to revisit the project to deal with the new threat. The work was transferred to the TsKB-53 bureau in Leningrad who produced a substantially larger and more capable design. Created by N. P. Sobolov, Project 1135 combined a powerful missile armament with good seakeeping for a blue water role and shared the same BPK designation as the larger ships. This was amended to Guard Ship (Сторожевой Корабль, SKR) from 28 July 1977 to reflect the change in Soviet strategy of creating protected areas for friendly submarines close to the coast. NATO forces called the new class 'Krivak'-class frigates.

Displacing 2,810 tonnes (2,770 long tons) standard and 3,200 t (3,100 long tons) full load, Silnyy was 123 m (403 ft 7 in) long overall, with a beam of 14.2 m (46 ft 7 in) and a draught of 4.5 m (14 ft 9 in). Power was provided by two M7 power sets, each consisting of a combination of a 18,000-shaft-horsepower (13,000 kW) DK59 and a 6,000 shp (4,500 kW) M62 gas turbine linked in a COGAG arrangement and driving one fixed-pitch propeller. Each set was capable of a maximum of 24,000 shp (18,000 kW). Design speed was 32 knots (59 km/h; 37 mph) and range was 3,950 nautical miles (7,315 km; 4,546 mi) at 14 knots (26 km/h; 16 mph). The ship's complement was 197, including 23 officers.

Silnyy initially had a primary mission of anti-submarine warfare and for this end was equipped with four URPK-3 Metel missiles (NATO reporting name SS-N-14 'Silex'), backed up by two quadruple torpedo tube mounts for 533-millimetre (21 in) torpedoes and a pair of 213 mm (8 in) RBU-6000 Smerch-2 anti-submarine rocket launchers. Defence against aircraft was provided by forty 4K33 OSA-M (SA-N-4 'Gecko') surface-to-air missiles which were launched from two sets of ZIF-122 launchers, each capable of launching two missiles. Two twin 76 mm (3 in) AK-726 guns were mounted aft and two single mounts for 45 mm (1.8 in) 21-km guns were carried on the superstructure. Provision was made for carrying 18 mines.

Silnyy had a well-equipped sensor suite, including a single MR-310A 'Angara-A' air/surface search radar, 'Volga' and 'Don-2' navigation radars, MP-401S 'Start-S' ESM radar system and 'Spectrum-F' laser warning system. An extensive sonar complex was fitted, including MG-332 'Titan-2', which was mounted in a bow radome, and MG-325 'Vega'. The latter was a towed-array sonar specifically developed for the class and had a range of up to 15 km (9.3 mi; 8.1 nmi). The ship was also equipped with the PK-16 decoy-dispenser system.

== Construction and career ==
Silnyy was laid down at the Yantar Shipyard in Kaliningrad on 15 March 1971, the third of the class to be constructed by the shipbuilder, and was given the yard number 154. The vessel was named for a Russian word which can be translated strong or fiery. Launched on 29 August 1972 and commissioned on 30 June the following year, the ship joined the Baltic Fleet.

In October 1974, Silnyy undertook the first of what would be number of visits to friendly nations. On 5 October, the vessel arrived at Gdynia in Poland along with sister ship Bditelnyy, staying for four days. Silnyy returned on 26 June 1975 and staying for another five days. The ship also ventured further, crossing the Atlantic Ocean and, between 22 and 27 August 1976 and 11 and 15 October 1985, visited Havana, Cuba. In between these deployments, the vessel was photographed by US aircraft while serving in the Gulf of Mexico on 30 September 1978. On 10 October 1988, Silnyy started a four-day visit to Praia, Cape Verde, and between 5 and 9 October 1989, could be found at Rostock in East Germany. The vessel also visited Nigeria, hosting a local deputation from Lagos on board. The visits were termed "friendly" and were frequently part of a wider programme of activity and cultural exchange.

On 26 July 1976, the vessel was escorting the aircraft carrier Kiev when the US Navy cruiser Josephus Daniels, which was shadowing the flotilla, approached closely. The US warship claimed that "she was shouldered" by the Soviet ship, which the Soviets denied. Neither vessel was damaged and the incident did not escalate.

On 3 December 1990, Silnyy sailed back to Kaliningrad to be repaired, and was there at the time of the dissolution of the Soviet Union on 26 December 1991. The ship was to be transferred to the Russian Navy. However, lack of funding instead meant that the ship was decommissioned on 30 June 1994 and was broken up at the Yantar shipyard between 1994 and 1995.
