= Soviet frigate Razumnyy =

Krivak-class frigate

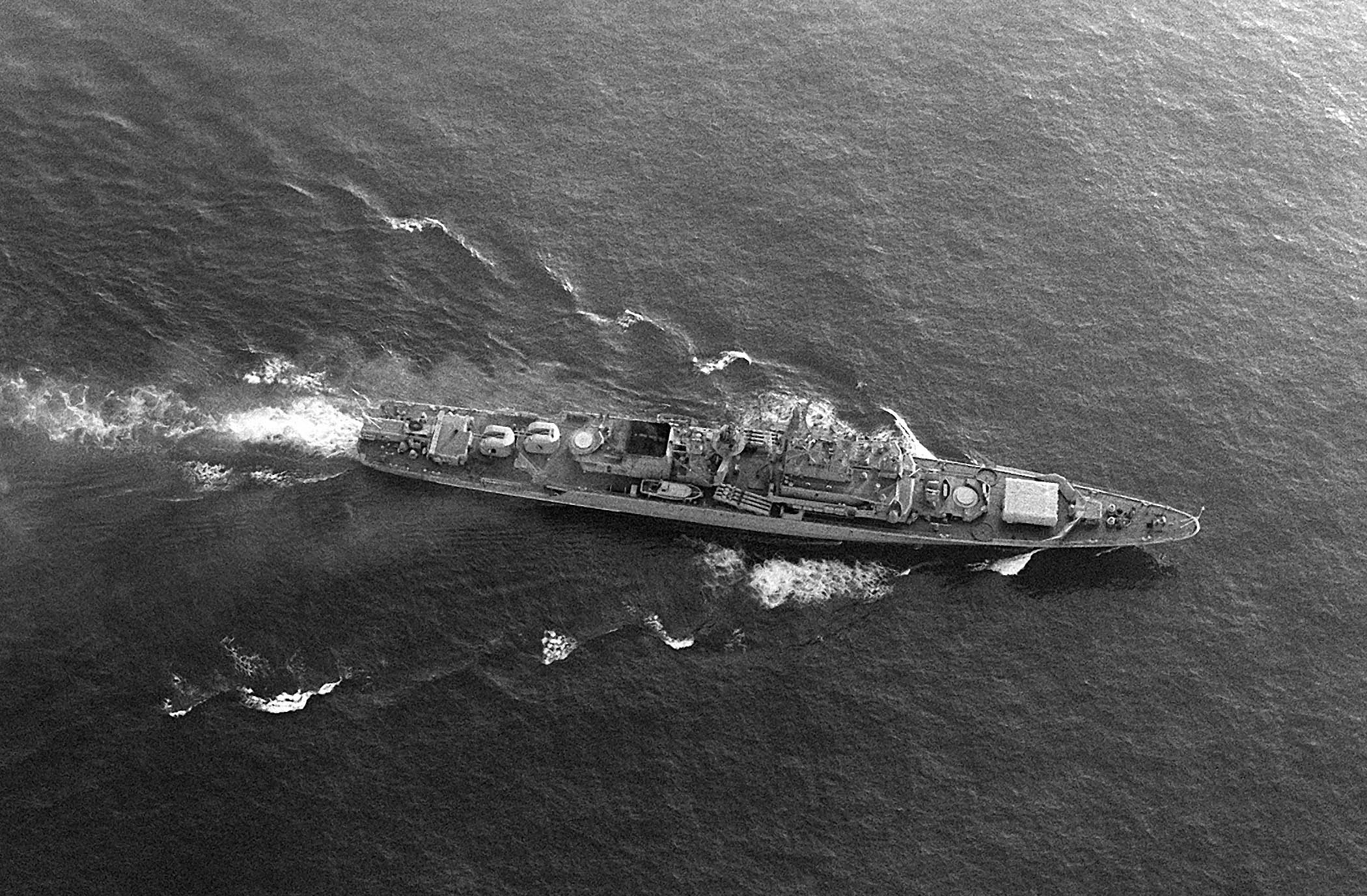
- Razumnyy 750 miles west of Midway Island in 1985.

History

Soviet Union
- Name: Razumnyy
- Namesake: Russian for Reasonable
- Builder: Yantar, Kaliningrad
- Yard number: 156
- Laid down: 26 June 1972
- Launched: 20 July 1973
- Commissioned: 30 September 1974
- Decommissioned: 16 March 1998

General characteristics
- Class & type: Project 1135 Burevestnik frigate
- Displacement: 2,810 t (2,770 long tons; 3,100 short tons) (standard); 3,200 t (3,100 long tons; 3,500 short tons) (full load)
- Length: 123 m (403 ft 7 in)
- Beam: 142 m (465 ft 11 in)
- Draft: 4.5 m (14 ft 9 in)
- Installed power: 48,000 shp (36,000 kW)
- Propulsion: 4 gas turbines; COGAG; 2 shafts
- Speed: 32 kn (59 km/h)
- Range: 4,000 nmi (7,408 km) at 14 kn (26 km/h)
- Complement: 23 officers, 174 men
- Sensors & processing systems: MR-310A Angara-A air/surface search radar; Volga and Don navigational radars; MG-332 Titan-2, MG-325 Vega, 2 MG-7 Braslet and MGS-400K sonars
- Electronic warfare & decoys: PK-16 decoy-dispenser system
- Armament: 4 × URPK-4 Metel (SS-N-14 'Silex') anti-submarine missiles (1×4); 4 × ZIF-122 4K33 launchers (2×2) with 40 4K33 OSA-M (SA-N-4'Gecko') surface to air missiles; 4 × 76 mm (3 in) AK-726 guns (2×2); 2 × RBU-6000 Smerch-2 anti-submarine rockets; 8 × 533 mm (21 in) torpedo tubes (2×4); 18 mines

Razumnyy (Russian: Разумный, "Reasonable") was a 1135 Burevestnik-class (Russian: Буревестник, "Petrel") Large Anti-Submarine Ship (Большой Противолодочный Корабль, BPK) or 'Krivak' class frigate that served with the Soviet and Russian Navies. Launched on 20 July 1973, the vessel operated as part of the Pacific Fleet, as a dedicated anti-submarine vessel, with an armament built around the Metel Anti-Ship Complex. The vessel undertook a number of tours, visiting the People's Democratic Republic of Yemen and India. The ship was decommissioned on 16 March 1998 and subsequently disarmed ready to be broken up before the end of the year.

== Design and development ==
Razumnyy was one of twenty-one Project 1135 ships launched between 1970 and 1981. Project 1135, the Burevestnik (Russian: Буревестник, "Petrel") class, was envisaged by the Soviet Navy as a less expensive complement to the Project 1134A Berkut A (NATO reporting name 'Kresta II') and Project 1134B Berkut B (NATO reporting name 'Kara') classes of ships. The design was originally given to TsKB-340, which had designed the earlier Project 159 (NATO reporting name 'Petya') and Project 35 (NATO reporting name 'Mirka') classes. However, the expansion in the United States Navy ballistic missile submarine fleet, and the introduction of longer-ranged and more accurate submarine-launched ballistic missiles led to a revisit of the project, which was transferred to TsKB-53 in Leningrad. The design, by N. P. Sobolov, combined a powerful missile armament with good seakeeping for a blue water role and shared the same BPK designation as the larger ships. This was amended to Guard Ship (Сторожевой Корабль, SKR) from 28 July 1977 to reflect the change in Soviet strategy of creating protected areas for friendly submarines close to the coast. NATO forces called the new class 'Krivak' class frigates.

Displacing 2,810 tonnes (2,770 long tons; 3,100 short tons) standard and 3,200 t (3,100 long tons; 3,500 short tons) full load, Razumnyy was 123 m (403 ft 7 in) long overall, with a beam of 14.2 m (46 ft 7 in) and a draught of 4.5 m (14 ft 9 in). Power was provided by two M7 sets, each consisting of a combination of a 18,000-shaft-horsepower (13,000 kW) DK59 and a 6,000 shp (4,500 kW) M62 gas turbine combined in a COGAG installation and driving one fixed-pitch propeller. Design speed was 32 knots (59 km/h; 37 mph) and range 3,950 nautical miles (7,315 km; 4,546 mi) at 14 kn (26 km/h; 16 mph). The ship's complement was 197, including 23 officers.

=== Armament and sensors ===
The ship was designed for anti-submarine warfare around four URPK-4 Metel missiles (NATO reporting name SS-N-14 'Silex'), backed up by a pair of quadruple launchers for 533 mm (21 in) torpedoes and a pair of RBU-6000 213 mm (8 in) Smerch-2 anti-submarine rocket launchers. Defence against aircraft was provided by forty 4K33 OSA-M (SA-N-4 'Gecko') surface to air missiles which were launched from two sets of ZIF-122 launchers, each capable of launching two missiles. Two twin 76 mm (3 in) AK-726 guns were mounted aft and provision was made for carrying 18 mines.

Razumnyy had a well-equipped sensor suite, including a single MR-310A Angara-A air/surface search radar, Volga and Don-2 navigation radars, the MP-401S Start-S ESM radar system and the Spectrum-F laser warning system. An extensive sonar complex was fitted, including MG-332 Titan-2, which was mounted in a bow radome, and MG-325 Vega. The latter was a towed-array sonar specifically developed for the class and had a range of up to 15 kilometres (9.3 mi). The ship was also equipped with the PK-16 decoy-dispenser system.

== Construction and career ==
Razumnyy was laid down by on 26 June 1972 with the yard number 156 at the Yantar Shipyard in Kaliningrad and launched on 20 July 1973. The ship was named for a Russian word that can be translated reasonable, clever or sensible. The vessel was commissioned on 30 September 1974 and joined the Pacific Fleet on 11 June 1975. Almost immediately, the ship was dispatched to participate in the Okean-75 exercise, which spanned four fleets and involved over 200 other Soviet vessels.

Razumnyy had a generally uneventful service, operating in the Indian and Pacific Oceans. The vessel undertook a goodwill visit to Aden in what was then the People's Democratic Republic of Yemen between 15 and 24 August 1978. The ship also visited Mumbai, India, between 15 and 19 November 1984 along with the Project 1135M Burevestnik M (NATO reporting name 'Krivak II') class vessel Revnostnyy. With the dissolution of the Soviet Union on 26 December 1991, the ship was transferred to the Russian Navy. Decommissioned on 16 March 1998 due to a general deterioration of the ship over the length of time in service, Razumnyy was transferred from the Navy and, by the end of the year, was completely disarmed and laid up at Petropavlovsk-Kamchatsky ready to be broken up.
