= Soviet frigate Bditelnyy =

Krivak-class frigate

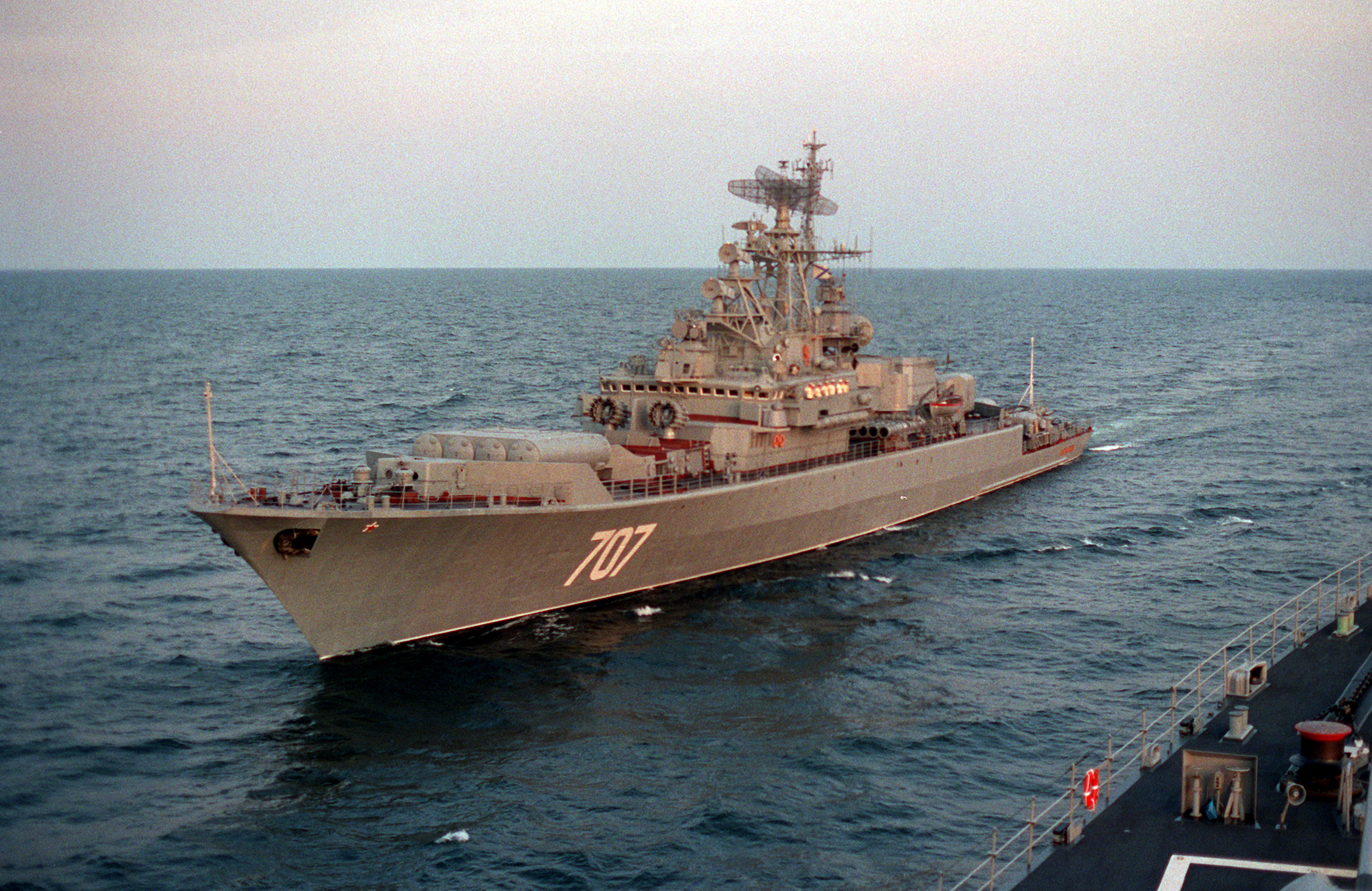
- A port bow view of Bditelnyy during the BALTOPS-93 exercise in 1993.

History

Soviet Union
- Name: Bditelnyy
- Namesake: Russian for Vigilant
- Builder: Yantar Shipyard, Kaliningrad
- Yard number: 151
- Laid down: 21 July 1968
- Launched: 28 March 1970
- Commissioned: 31 December 1970
- Decommissioned: 31 July 1996
- Fate: Broken up

General characteristics
- Class & type: Project 1135 Burevestnik frigate
- Displacement: 2,810 tonnes (2,770 long tons; 3,100 short tons) standard; 3,200 tonnes (3,100 long tons; 3,500 short tons) (full load)
- Length: 123 m (403 ft 7 in) (o.a.)
- Beam: 14.2 m (46 ft 7 in)
- Draft: 4.51 m (14 ft 10 in)
- Installed power: 48,000 shp (36,000 kW)
- Propulsion: 4 gas turbines; COGAG, 2 shafts
- Speed: 32 knots (59 km/h)
- Range: 4,000 nmi (7,408 km) at 14 knots (26 km/h)
- Complement: 23 officers, 174 ratings
- Sensors & processing systems: MR-310A Angara-A air/surface search radar; Volga and Don-2 navigational radar; MG-332 Titan-2 and MG-325 Vega sonars
- Electronic warfare & decoys: PK-16 ship-borne decoy-dispenser system
- Armament: 4 × URPK-4 Metel (SS-N-14 'Silex') anti-submarine missiles (1x4); 4 × ZIF-122 4K33 launchers (2x2) with 40 4K33 OSA-M (SA-N-4 'Gecko') surface to air missiles; 4 × 76 mm (3 in) AK-726 guns (2×2); 2 × RBU-6000 Smerch-2 anti-submarine rockets; 8 × 533 mm (21 in) torpedo tubes (2x4); 18 mines

Bditel'nyy or Bditelnyy (Russian: Бдительный, "Vigilant") was a Project 1135 Burevestnik (Russian: Буревестник, "Petrel") Large Anti-Submarine Ship (Большой Противолодочный Корабль, BPK) or Krivak-class frigate that served with the Soviet and Russian Navies. Launched on 28 March 1970, the vessel served as part of the Baltic Fleet but operated more widely than the Baltic Sea, demonstrating the emerging blue water capability of the Navy. A dedicated anti-submarine vessel, with an armament built around the Metel system, the ship spent the period between 26 December 1970 and 30 September 1971 undertaking trials and tests to prove the new systems. During that time General Secretary Leonid Brezhnev and Admiral of the Fleet Sergey Gorshkov were both hosted on board. The vessel then subsequently undertook tracking of submarines in the Baltic, Black and Mediterranean Seas, and even travelled as far as Cuba, crossing the Atlantic Ocean. The ship also visited friendly ports like Annaba in Algeria, Gdynia in Poland and Rostock in East Germany. With the end of the Cold War, the ship also travelled to Belgium and visited Antwerp. During June 1993, Bditelnyy took part in BALTOPS-93, the first joint exercise between NATO and Russia. However, soon afterwards, the ship was retired and, on 31 July 1996, decommissioned and subsequently broken up.

== Design and development ==
Bditelnyy was the first Project 1135 Burevestnik (Russian: Буревестник, "Petrel") Large Anti-Submarine Ship (Большой Противолодочный Корабль, BPK) laid down. Project 1135 was envisaged by the Soviet Navy as a less expensive complement to the Project 1134A Berkut A (NATO reporting name 'Kresta II') and Project 1134B Berkut B (NATO reporting name 'Kara') classes of ships. The design was originally given to TsKB-340, which had designed the earlier Project 159 (NATO reporting name 'Petya') and Project 35 (NATO reporting name 'Mirka') classes. However, the expansion in the United States Navy ballistic missile submarine fleet and the introduction of longer-ranged and more accurate submarine-launched ballistic missiles led to a revisit of the project, which was transferred to TsKB-53 in Leningrad. The design, by N. P. Sobolov, combined a powerful missile armament with good seakeeping for a blue water role and shared the same BPK designation as the larger ships. NATO forces called the new vessels Krivak class frigates.

Displacing 2,810 tonnes (2,770 long tons; 3,100 short tons) standard and 3,200 t (3,100 long tons; 3,500 short tons) full load, the vessel was 123 m (404 ft) in overall length, with a maximum beam of 14.2 m (46 ft 7 in) and an average draught of 4.51 m (14 ft 10 in). Power was provided by two M7K combinations each consisting of a combination of a 18,000 shaft horsepower (13,000 kW) DK59 and a 6,000 shp (4,500 kW) M62 gas turbine combined in a COGAG installation and driving one fixed-pitch propeller for a design speed of 32 knots (59 km/h; 37 mph). Range was 4,000 nautical miles (7,408 km; 4,603 mi) at 14 kn (26 km/h; 16 mph). The ship’s complement was 197, including 23 officers.

=== Armament and sensors ===
The ship was designed for anti-submarine warfare around four URPK-4 Metel missiles (NATO reporting name SS-N-14 'Silex'), backed up by a pair of quadruple mounts for 533 mm (21 in) torpedoes and a pair of RBU-6000 213 mm (8.4 in) Smerch-2 anti-submarine rocket launchers. Defence against aircraft was provided by forty 4K33 OSA-M (SA-N-4 'Gecko') surface-to-air missiles which were launched from two sets of ZIF-122 launchers, each capable of launching two missiles. Two twin 76 mm (3 in) AK-726 guns were mounted aft and provision was made for carrying 18 mines.

The ship had a well-equipped sensor suite, including a single MR-310A Angara-A air/surface search radar, Volga and Don-2 navigation radar, MP-401S Start-S ESM radar system and Spectrum-F laser warning system. An extensive sonar complex was fitted, including MG-332 Titan-2, which was mounted in a bow radome, and MG-325 Vega. Vega was a towed array sonar specifically developed for the class and had a range of up to 15 kilometres (9.3 mi). The ship was also equipped with the PK-16 decoy-dispenser system.

== Construction and career ==
Bditelnyy was laid down by on 21 July 1968 with the yard number 151 at the Yantar Shipyard in Kaliningrad and launched on 28 March 1970. The ship was named for a Russian word that can be translated alert, vigilant or watchful. The crew arrived, led by Captain of the Third Rank Gennady Mikhailovich Generalov, on 5 October and the flag was first raised on 5 December. After sea trials between 26 and 31 December, the vessel was commissioned on the final day of 1970.

=== 1970s ===
On 16 March 1971, the ship joined the 128th Brigade of the Baltic Fleet and, later that month undertook test firing of the Metel, although not all weapons were operational until 30 September. In the interim was the vessel's first voyage, from the Baltic to the Black Sea between 1 and 20 June. To ensure the smooth running of the ship so soon after commissioning, thirty motive power specialists travelled with the ship. It was during this voyage that NATO first named the ship Krivak. After arriving in Sevastopol, the ship undertook more weapons tests, including test launches of surface-to-air missiles. On 4 August, the ship hosted General Secretary Leonid Brezhnev and Admiral of the Fleet Sergey Gorshkov, the latter who returned again later in the year.

Between 18 June and 29 November 1972, the vessel joined sistership Bodryy, newly commissioned, as part of Task Force KUG-1 in the Mediterranean Sea. Anti-submarine systems were successfully tested with three contacts made with submarines. During the time, the vessel also supported the withdrawal of Soviet military advisors from Egypt before 29 July 1972 following the Corrective Revolution. This was followed by two visits to Gdynia, Poland, between 5 and 9 October 1973 and 20 to 24 July 1974, and participation in Sever-77 between 14 and 24 April 1977. Along with the rest of the class, the ship was redesignated a Guard Ship (Сторожевой Корабль, SKR) on 28 July 1977 to reflect the change in Soviet strategy to one of creating protected areas for friendly submarines close to the coast. However, this did not restrict international operations, which increasingly demonstrated the Soviet ability to operate as a blue-water navy. The vessel served in the Atlantic Ocean between 18 August and 2 February 1978, tracking submarines and observing NATO forces as well as visiting Havana, Cuba, twice, between 17 and 22 December and 25 December and 14 January. Bditelnyy then returned to the Baltic Sea, participating in Baltika-78 between 28 June and 7 August 1978, and visiting Rostock, East Germany, between 3 and 10 October the following year.

=== 1980s and end of service ===
Bditelnyy returned to Cuba between 15 April and 11 May 1981. The vessel revisited Havana and spent time in Cienfuegos, as well as taking part in joint manoeuvres with the Cuban Revolutionary Navy. 25 May 1982 found the ship back in the Mediterranean, and between 22 and 29 June, the ship visited Annaba, Algeria. The ship then returned to the Baltic, escorting the Project 1143 Krechyet aircraft carrier Kiev, between 24 July and 1 August 1983. On 12 February the next year, the vessel was sent to Yantar for repairs and upgrades. The main armament was upgraded to URPK-5 Rastrub (SS-N-14B) missiles to add anti-shipping capability. Reentering service on 25 January 1986, the vessel subsequently revisited Rostock and Gdynia and then, between 12 and 24 June 1988, Szczecin, Poland, and then Rostock again between 6 and 10 October 1989.

The new decade saw rapid changes in the Soviet Navy. With the end of the Cold War, the ship undertook an official visit to Antwerp, Belgium, between 6 and 25 June 1991 and at the dissolution of the Soviet Union, joined the Russian Navy. In June 1993, the ship joined BALTOPS-93, the first joint naval exercise between NATO and Russian forces. This was the last operation for the vessel and the ship was retired soon after. Attempts to preserve the vessel, the first of the class, as a floating museum failed and Bditelnyy was decommissioned on 31 July 1996. The ship was subsequently broken up.
