= Soviet frigate Bodryy =

Soviet Navy vessel

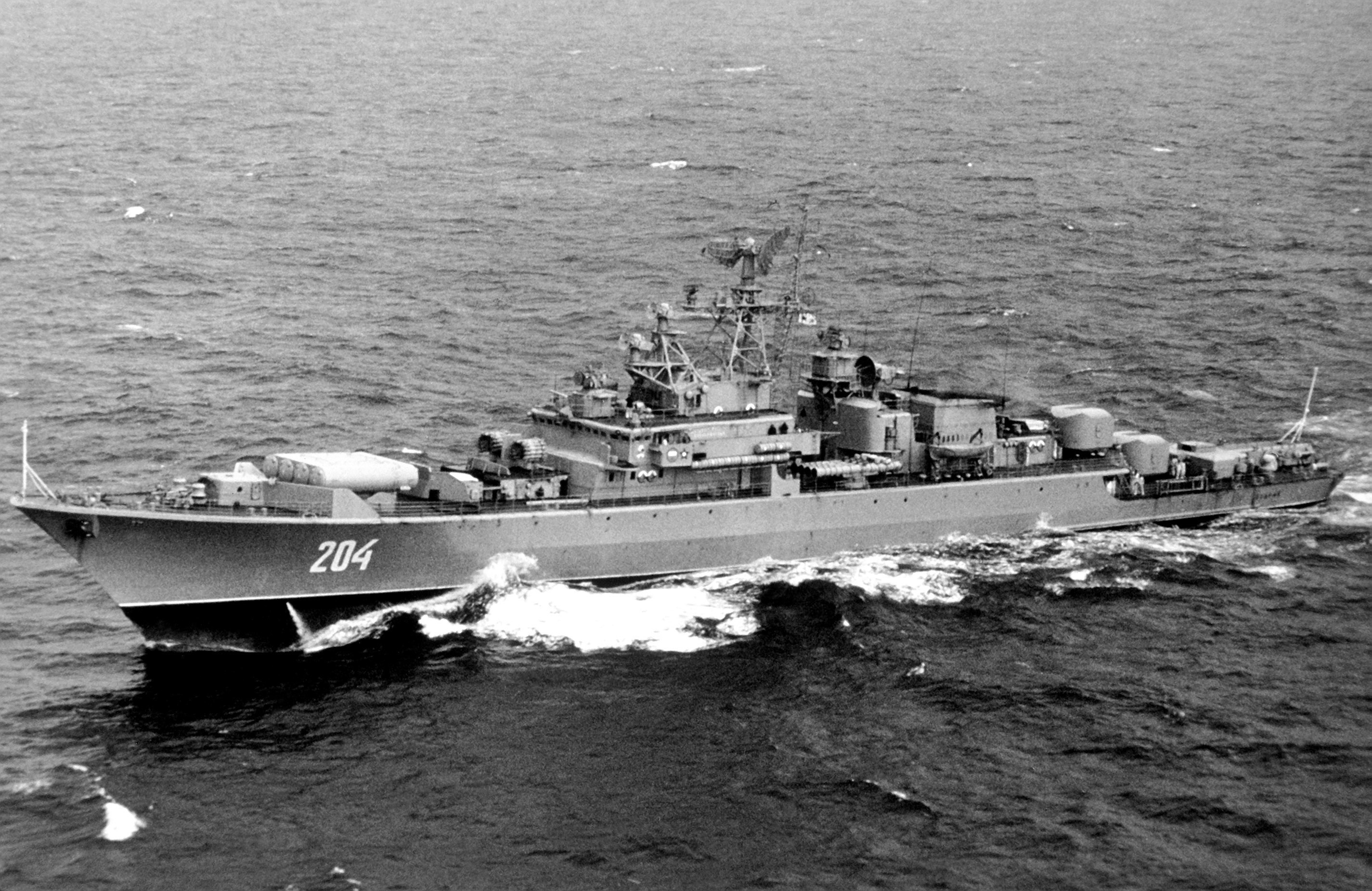
- An aerial port bow view of Bodryy underway in 1975.

History

Soviet Union
- Name: Bodryy
- Namesake: Russian for Brisk
- Builder: Yantar, Kaliningrad
- Yard number: 152
- Laid down: 15 January 1969
- Launched: 15 April 1971
- Commissioned: 31 December 1971
- Decommissioned: 17 July 1997
- Fate: Scrapped at Yantar, 1998

General characteristics
- Class & type: Project 1135 Burevestnik frigate
- Displacement: 2,835 t (2,790 long tons) standard, 3,190 t (3,140 long tons; 3,520 short tons) full load
- Length: 123 m (403 ft 7 in)
- Beam: 14.2 m (46 ft 7 in)
- Draft: 4.5 m (14 ft 9 in)
- Propulsion: 2 shaft; COGAG; 2x M-3 gas-turbines, 36,000 shp; 2x M-60 gas-turbines (cruise), 12,000 shp
- Speed: 32 knots (59 km/h; 37 mph)
- Range: 4,000 nmi (7,408 km) at 14 knots (26 km/h; 16 mph)
- Complement: 22 officers, 158 petty officers and sailors
- Sensors & processing systems: MR-310A Angara-A air/surface search radar, Volga navigation radar, Don navigation radar, MG-332 Titan-2, MG-325 Vega, 2 MG-7 Braslet and MGS-400K sonars
- Electronic warfare & decoys: PK-16 ship-borne decoy dispenser system
- Armament: 4× URPK-3 Metel (SS-N-14 'Silex') anti-submarine missiles (1x4); 4× ZIF-122 4K33 launchers (22) with 40 4K33 OSA-M (SA-N-4'Gecko') surface to air missiles; 4× 76 mm (3 in) AK-726 guns (2×2); 2× 45 mm (2 in) 21KM guns (2x1); 2× RBU-6000 Smerch-2 Anti-Submarine rockets; 8× 533 mm (21 in) torpedo tubes (2x4); 18 mines

Bodryy (Russian: Бодрый, "brisk") was a Project 1135 Burevestnik-class Large Anti-Submarine Ship (Большой Противолодочный Корабль, BPK) or Krivak-class frigate. Launched on 15 April 1971, the vessel served with the Soviet Navy until it was dissolved and then was transferred to the Russian Navy. The ship played a key role in helping the Soviets develop techniques for tracking ballistic missile submarines in the 1970s. Bodryy was retired on 17 July 1997 and scrapped.

== Design and development ==
=== Development ===
Designed by N.P. Sobolov, Bodryy was the second Project 1135 Large Anti-Submarine Ship (Russian: Большой Противолодочный Корабль, BPK) laid down. The vessel is named for a Russian word which can be translated brisk, vigorous, energetic, bright, cheerful or alert. Bodryy served with the Soviet Navy, and the Russian Navy after the dissolution of the Soviet Union, as an anti-submarine frigate. The ship was designated a Guard Ship (Сторожевой Корабль, SKR) from 28 July 1977.

=== Design ===
Displacing 2,835 tonnes (2,790 long tons) standard and 3,190 tonnes (3,140 long tons) full load, the vessel was 123 m (403 ft 7 in) in length overall, with a beam of 14.2 m (46 ft 7 in) and a draught of 4.5 m (14 ft 9 in). Power was provided by a combination of two 18,000 horsepower (13,000 kW) M3 and two 6,000 horsepower (4,500 kW) M60 gas turbines installed as a COGAG set named М7 for a design speed of 32 knots (59 km/h; 37 mph). Range was 4,000 nautical miles (7,408 km; 4,603 mi) at 14 knots (26 km/h; 16 mph), 3,515 nmi (6,510 km; 4,045 mi) at 18 knots (33 km/h; 21 mph), 3,155 nmi (5,843 km; 3,631 mi) at 24 knots (44 km/h; 28 mph) and 1,240 nmi (2,296 km; 1,427 mi) at 32 knots (59 km/h; 37 mph). A complement of 180, including 22 officers, was carried.

=== Armament ===
The ship was designed for anti-submarine warfare around four URPK-3 Metel missiles (NATO reporting name SS-N-14 "Silex"), backed up by a pair of quadruple 533-millimetre (21.0 in) torpedoes and a pair of RBU-6000 213 mm (8 in) anti-submarine rocket launchers. The main armament was upgraded to URPK-5 Rastrub (SS-N-14B) between 1982 and 1984. Defence against aircraft was provided by forty 4K33 OSA-M (SA-N-4 "Gecko") surface to air missiles which were launched from four ZIF-122 launchers. Two twin 76 mm (3 in) AK-726 guns were mounted aft. Mines were also carried, either eighteen IGDM-500 KSM, fourteen KAM, fourteen KB "Krab", ten Serpey, four PMR-1, seven PMR-2, seven MTPK-1, fourteen RM-1 mines or twelve UDM-2.

The ship had a well-equipped sensor suite, including a single MR-310A "Angara-A" air/surface search radar, "Volga" navigation radar, "Don" navigation radar, MP-401S "Start-S" ESM radar system, "Nickel-KM" and "Khrom-KM" IFF and ARP-50R radio direction finder. An extensive sonar complement was fitted, including MG-332 "Titan-2", MG-325 "Vega" and MGS-400K, along with two MG-7 "Braslet" anti-saboteur sonars and the MG-26 "Hosta" underwater communication system. The PK-16 ship-borne decoy dispenser system was fitted; this was replaced by the PK-10 system in 1983.

== Construction and service ==
=== Construction ===
Bodryy was laid down by Yantar in Kaliningrad on 15 January 1969, and was given the yard number 152. The vessel was launched on 15 April 1971 and commissioned on 31 December later that year.

=== Service ===
Bodryy was commissioned with the Baltic Fleet on 14 February 1972 as part of the 128th Brigade. Between 14 June and 29 November that year, the ship operated in the Mediterranean as part of Task Force KUG-1 under Oktyabrskaya Revolyutsia alongside sister ship Bditelnyy. The task force undertook training in anti-submarine warfare and provided Soviet presence in the region in support of allies Egypt and Syria. Afterwards, in April 1973, the vessel was transferred to the first of many periods in the Atlantic Ocean and Caribbean Sea. Initially serving under Sverdlov, the vessel developed methods for tracking ballistic missile submarines of the US Navy off Rota, Andalusia. Testing continued with towed array sonar between June 1977 and January 1976 in the central Atlantic and Caribbean. In the 1970s, eight out ten of the crew were commended by the commanding officer for their combat and political training.

The vessel started the 1980s operating in the North Sea and visited Helsinki between 7 and 10 August 1981. This was followed by visits to the African cities of Luanda in Angola and Lagos in Nigeria in June and July 1982. The vessel was subsequently temporarily based at the Angolan capital between 7 January and 18 May 1987 and then 15 November 1990 and 16 May 1991 while operating in the South Atlantic. The ship was decommissioned on 17 July 1997. Subsequently Bodryy was transferred to be scrapped at Yantar in 1998.

== Pennant numbers ==
Pennant number	Date
220	1970
503	1971
222	1972
517, 508	1974
204	1975
513	1975
505	1977
514	1978
788	1978
705	1979
724	1981
704	1984
722	1988
710	1990
