= Soviet ship Revnostny =

Revnostny (Russian: Ревностный), also transliterated as Revnostnyy or Revnostniy, is the name of the following ships of the Soviet Navy:

- Soviet destroyer Revnostny, a Gnevny-class destroyer launched in 1941 and sold for scrap in 1962
- Soviet frigate Revnostnyy, a Krivak-class frigate in commission 1980–2003
