= Soviet frigate Revnostnyy =

Krivak-class frigate

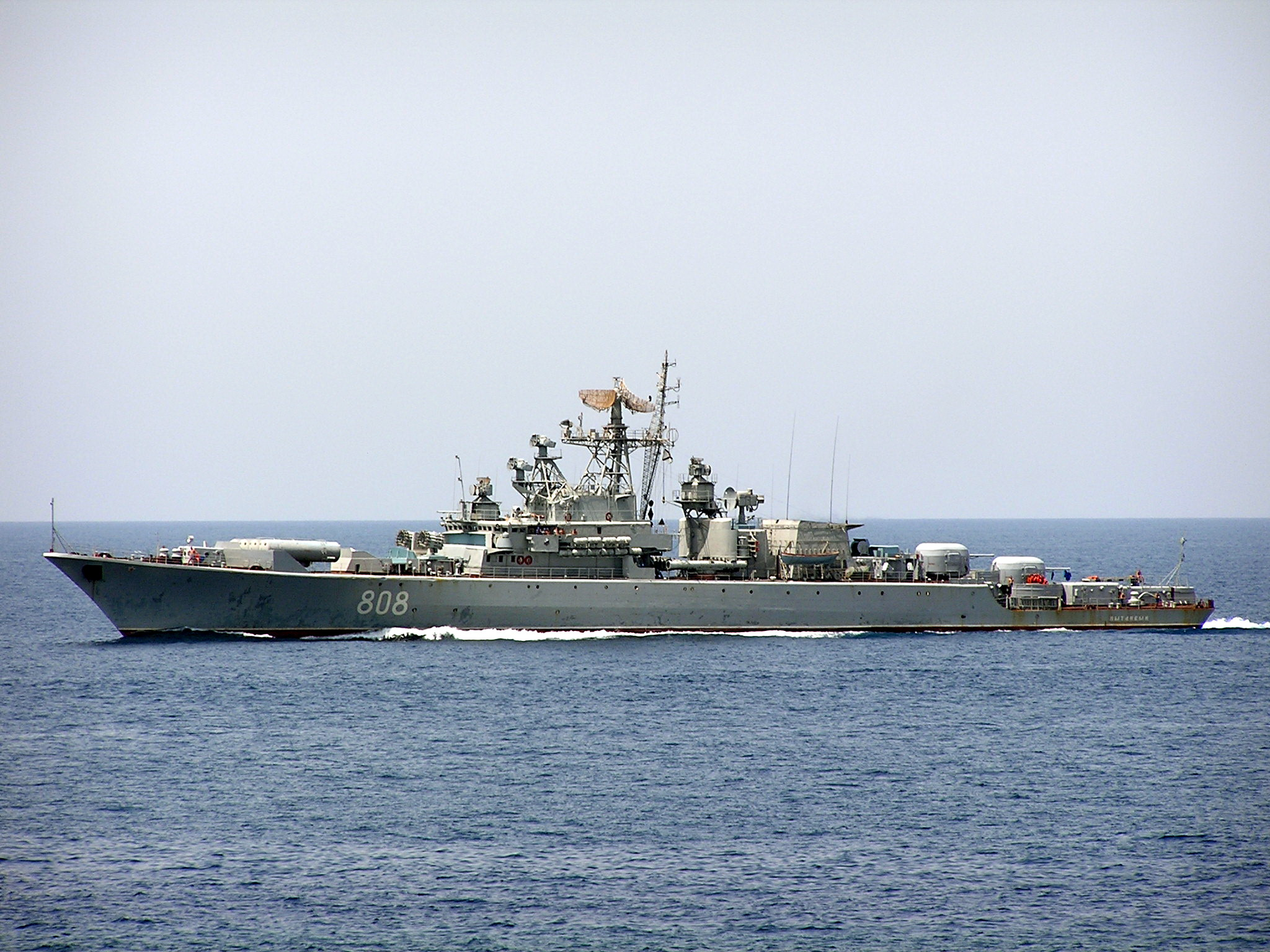
- Sister ship Pytlivij underway on 18 June 2003.

History

Soviet Union → Russia
- Name: Revnostnyy
- Namesake: Russian for Zealous
- Builder: Yantar shipyard, Kaliningrad
- Yard number: 168
- Laid down: 27 June 1979
- Launched: 23 April 1980
- Commissioned: 27 December 1980
- Decommissioned: 24 July 2003
- Fate: Sold to be broken up

General characteristics
- Class & type: Project 1135M Burevestnik frigate
- Displacement: 2,935 t (2,889 long tons; 3,235 short tons) (standard); 3,305 t (3,253 long tons; 3,643 short tons) (full load)
- Length: 123 m (403 ft 7 in)
- Draft: 4.5 m (14 ft 9 in)
- Installed power: 44,000 shp (33,000 kW)
- Propulsion: 4 gas turbines; COGAG; 2 shafts
- Speed: 32 kn (59 km/h)
- Range: 3,900 nmi (7,223 km) at 14 kn (26 km/h)
- Complement: 23 officers, 171 ratings
- Sensors & processing systems: MR-310A Angara-A air/surface search radar; Don navigational radar; MR-143 Lev-214 fire control radar; MG-332T Titan-2T, MG-325 Vega, 2 MG-7 Braslet and MGS-400K sonars
- Electronic warfare & decoys: PK-16 decoy-dispenser system
- Armament: 4 × URPK-5 Rastrub (SS-N-14 'Silex') anti-submarine and anti-shipping missiles (1×4); 4 × ZIF-122 4K33 launchers (2×2) with 40 4K33 OSA-M (SA-N-4'Gecko') surface to air missiles; 2 × 100 mm (4 in) AK-100 guns (2×1); 2 × RBU-6000 Smerch-2 anti-submarine rockets; 8 × 533 mm (21 in) torpedo tubes (2×4)

Revnostnyy (Russian: Ревностный, "Zealous") was a Project 1135M Burevestnik-class (Russian: Буревестник, "Petrel") Guard Ship (Сторожевой Корабль, SKR) or 'Krivak' class frigate that served with the Soviet Navy. Launched on 23 April 1980, the vessel operated as part of the Pacific Fleet as an anti-submarine vessel, with an armament built around the Metel Anti-Ship Complex. Revnostnyy patrolled extensively as far afield as the Arabian Peninsula and Sea of Japan. The ship undertook a friendly visit to India in 1984 and, during the following year, formed part of the escort for a flotilla led by the Soviet aircraft carrier Novorossiysk which helped develop Soviet tactics for carrier-borne aircraft. Taken out of service for an overhaul in 1988, Revnostnyy was instead placed in reserve until 24 July 2003, when the ship was decommissioned and sold to be broken up.

== Design and development ==
Revnostnyy was one of eleven Project 1135M ships launched between 1970 and 1981. Project 1135, the Burevestnik (Russian: Буревестник, "Petrel") class, was envisaged by the Soviet Navy as a less expensive complement to the Project 1134A Berkut A (NATO reporting name 'Kresta II') and Project 1134B Berkut B (NATO reporting name 'Kara') classes of ships. Project 1135M was an improvement developed in 1972 with slightly increased displacement and heavier guns compared with the basic 1135. The design, by N. P. Sobolov, combined a powerful missile armament with good seakeeping for a blue water role. The ships initially retained the same BPK designation as the larger vessels but were designated Guard Ship (Сторожевой Корабль, SKR) from 28 July 1977 to reflect their substantial greater anti-ship capability than the earlier members of the class and the Soviet strategy of creating protected areas for friendly submarines close to the coast. NATO forces called the vessels 'Krivak II'-class frigates.

Displacing 2,935 tonnes (2,889 long tons; 3,235 short tons) standard and 3,305 t (3,253 long tons; 3,643 short tons) full load, Revnostnyy was 123 m (403 ft 7 in) long overall, with a beam of 14.2 m (46 ft 7 in) and a draught of 4.5 m (14 ft 9 in). Power was provided by two M7K power sets, each consisting of a combination of a 17,000-shaft-horsepower (13,000 kW) DK59 and a 5,000 shp (3,700 kW) M62 gas turbine arranged in a COGAG installation and driving one fixed-pitch propeller. Each set was capable of a maximum of 24,000 shp (18,000 kW) Design speed was 32 knots (59 km/h; 37 mph) and range 3,900 nautical miles (7,223 km; 4,488 mi) at 14 kn (26 km/h; 16 mph). The ship’s complement was 194, including 23 officers.

=== Armament and sensors ===
Revnostnyy was designed for anti-submarine warfare around four URPK-5 Rastrub missiles (NATO reporting name SS-N-14 'Silex'), backed up by a pair of quadruple launchers for 533 mm (21 in) torpedoes and a pair of RBU-6000 213 mm (8 in) Smerch-2 anti-submarine rocket launchers. The URPK-5 also had anti-ship capabilities. Defence against aircraft was provided by forty 4K33 OSA-M (SA-N-4 'Gecko') surface to air missiles which were launched from two sets of twin-arm ZIF-122 launchers. Two 100 mm (4 in) AK-100 guns were mounted aft in a superfiring arrangement.

The ship had a well-equipped sensor suite, including a single MR-310A Angara-A air/surface search radar, Don navigation radar, the MP-401S Start-S ESM radar system and the Spectrum-F laser warning system. Fire control for the guns was provided by a MR-143 Lev-214 radar. An extensive sonar complex was fitted, including the bow-mounted MG-332T Titan-2T and the towed-array MG-325 Vega that had a range of up to 15 kilometres (9.3 mi). In addition to the PK-16 decoy-dispenser system, which used chaff, the vessel was equipped with an additional eight-tube decoy system aft specially developed for point-defence against missiles.

== Construction and career ==
Laid down by on 27 June 1979 with the yard number 168 at the Yantar Shipyard in Kaliningrad, Revnostnyy was launched on 23 April 1980. The ship was the penultimate of the class built at the yard. The ship was named for a Russian word that can be translated zealous. The vessel was commissioned on 27 December and was initially based at Baltiysk. The Soviet Union was expanding its Asian presence, and expanding the Pacific Fleet with large combat vessels of comparable capability to the European fleets. Therefore, on 21 February 1981, Revnostnyy was allocated to the Pacific Fleet and set off from the Baltic Sea.

Revnostnyy operated in the Indian and Pacific Oceans, patrolling as far as the coast of East Africa and the Arabian Peninsula. The ship visited Mumbai, India, arriving on 15 November 1984 along with the Project 1135 Burevestnik (NATO reporting name 'Krivak I' class) vessel Razumnyy. The pair stayed for four days. Between 25 March and 17 April 1985, Revnostnyy took part in a major exercise off the coast of Hawaii. A major force, which included the Project 1143 Krechyet ('Kiev' class) aircraft cruiser Novorossiysk, three Project 1134B Berkut B ('Kara' class) warships, Revnostnyy and others, was deployed to undertake tactical training in the use of carrier-based aircraft. The exercise was followed by a cruise in the Sea of Japan between 29 May and 16 June to develop tactics for aircraft to undertake anti-shipping and anti-submarine patrols. This was particularly noticed by the United States as the sea is a major deployment area for Soviet ballistic missile submarines.

The ship was handed to Dalzavod in Vladivostok in 1988 for a medium overhaul, but never returned to service. Initially put in reserve, Revnostnyy was decommissioned on 24 July 2003 and sold to be broken up.
