= RGB-60 =

Russian anti-submarine weapon

RGB-60 (Rocket Guided Bomb model 60) is a Russian anti-submarine weapon with a range of 5,700–6,000 m that can function to depths of 500 m. They can be fired from ships in salvos of up to 12 using the RBU-6000.

== Indian Navy service ==
=== Local production ===
India has several local versions of the RGB-60. An indigenous version by HAPP and Tiruchi was reported in 2010. In 2012 a version of the RGB-60 was provided to the Indian Navy by Ammunition Factory Khadki with a strike range of 1,500 m. In 2023, a new YDB-60 fuse was delivered.

=== Extended Range Anti-Submarine Rocket (ERASR) ===
In the 2020s, ARDE worked with the High Energy Materials Research Laboratory and the Naval Science and Technological Laboratory to create ERASR, an extended range version of the RGB-60 rocket that was previously employed in the RBU-6000 and its Indian equivalent, Indigenous Rocket Launchers (IRL). With its twin motor propulsion system, ERASR can launch the rocket 500–8,900 m (1,600–29,200 ft) in both short-range and long-range modes. On April 3, 2023, the rocket was successfully test fired from INS Chennai (D65).

The Indian Navy finished the ERASR user trials from the IRL aboard INS Kavaratti (P31) between June 27 and July 3, 2025. During the trials, 17 rockets at various ranges were successfully fired. Every trial goal, such as range performance, electronic time fuze operation, and warhead functioning, was successfully proved. The rocket system is being produced in collaboration with Solar Defence & Aerospace Limited and Bharat Dynamics Limited. The ERASR System is anticipated to be introduced by the Navy shortly.
