= Mirka-class frigate =

Class of Soviet light frigates

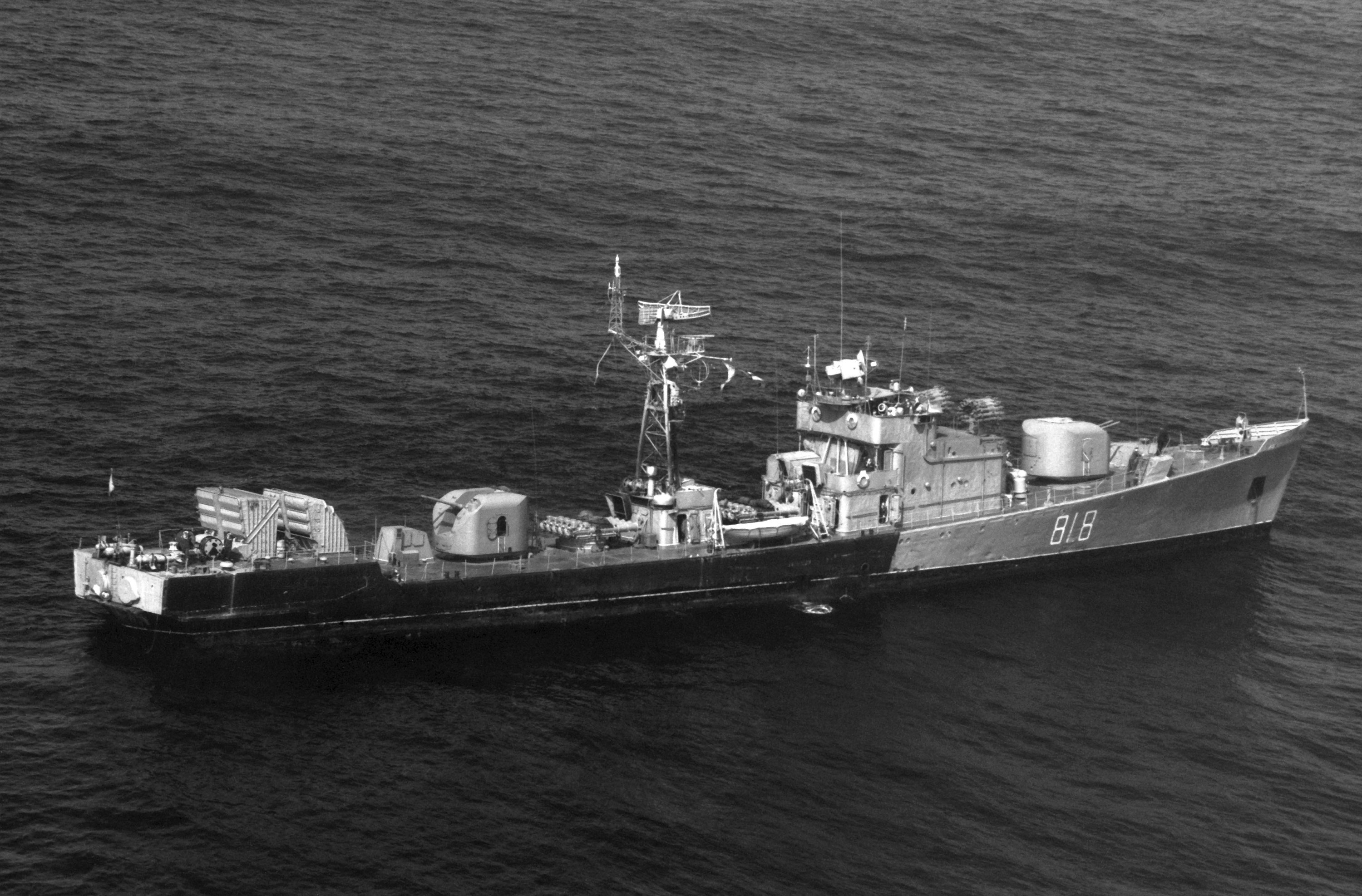
- Mirka I class, project 35 frigate

Class overview
- Name: Mirka class (project 35 /35M)
- Operators: Soviet Navy
- Preceded by: Petya class
- Succeeded by: Koni class
- Built: 1964-1966
- Completed: 18
- Retired: 18

General characteristics
- Type: Frigate
- Displacement: 950 tons (standard); 1,150 tons (full load)
- Length: 81.8 m (268 ft 4 in)
- Beam: 9.2 m (30 ft 2 in)
- Draught: 2.9 m (9 ft 6 in)
- Propulsion: 2 shaft CODAG; 2 gas turbines - 30,000 hp (22,000 kW); 2 diesels - 12,000 hp (8,900 kW)
- Speed: 34 knots (63 km/h; 39 mph)
- Range: 4,800 nautical miles (8,900 km; 5,500 mi) at 10 knots (19 km/h; 12 mph); 500 nautical miles (930 km; 580 mi) at 30 knots (56 km/h; 35 mph)
- Complement: 98
- Sensors & processing systems: Radar Don-2; Slim Net; Hawk Screech; Sonar - Herkules hull mounted & dipping sonar
- Armament: 4 76 mm (3 in) guns (2x2); 4 RBU-6000 anti-submarine rocket launchers (2 in some ships); 5 406 mm (16 in) anti-submarine torpedo tubes

The Mirka class was the NATO reporting name for a class of light frigates built for the Soviet Navy in the mid to late 1960s. The Soviet designation was Storozhevoi Korabl (escort ship) Project 35 (Mirka I) and Project 35M (Mirka II).

== Design ==
The role of these ships was anti-submarine warfare in shallow waters and they were similar to the Petya-class frigates but had a modified machinery suite. The machinery consisted of two shafts with diesels and gas turbines (CODAG). The propellers were in tunnels (similar to water jets). The machinery proved noisy and not very reliable.

== Ships ==
A total of 18 ships were built by Yantar shipyard, Kaliningrad, for the Soviet Navy. All ships were decommissioned between 1989 and 1992.

== Gallery ==
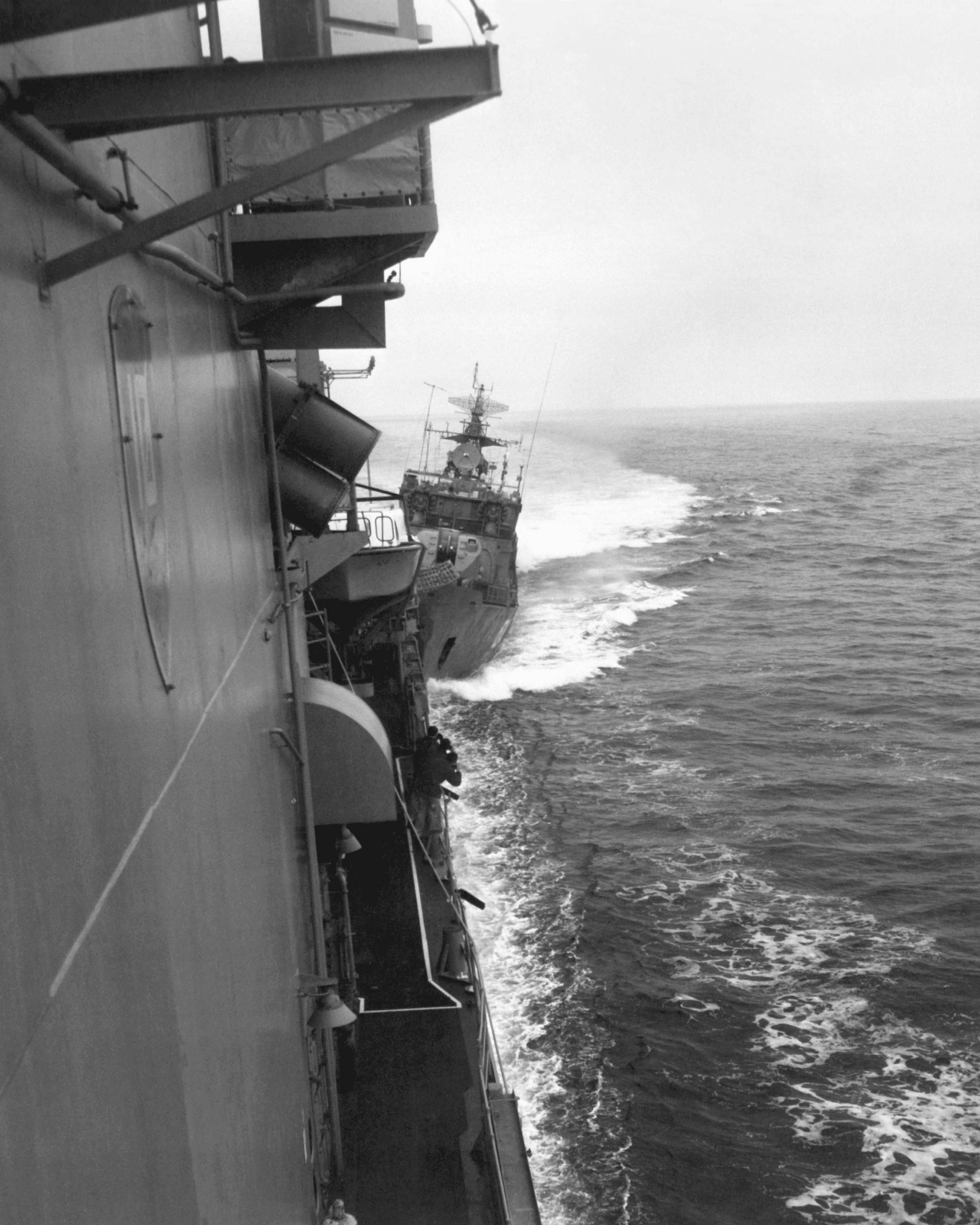
Mirka I-class frigate SKR-6 ramming USS Caron

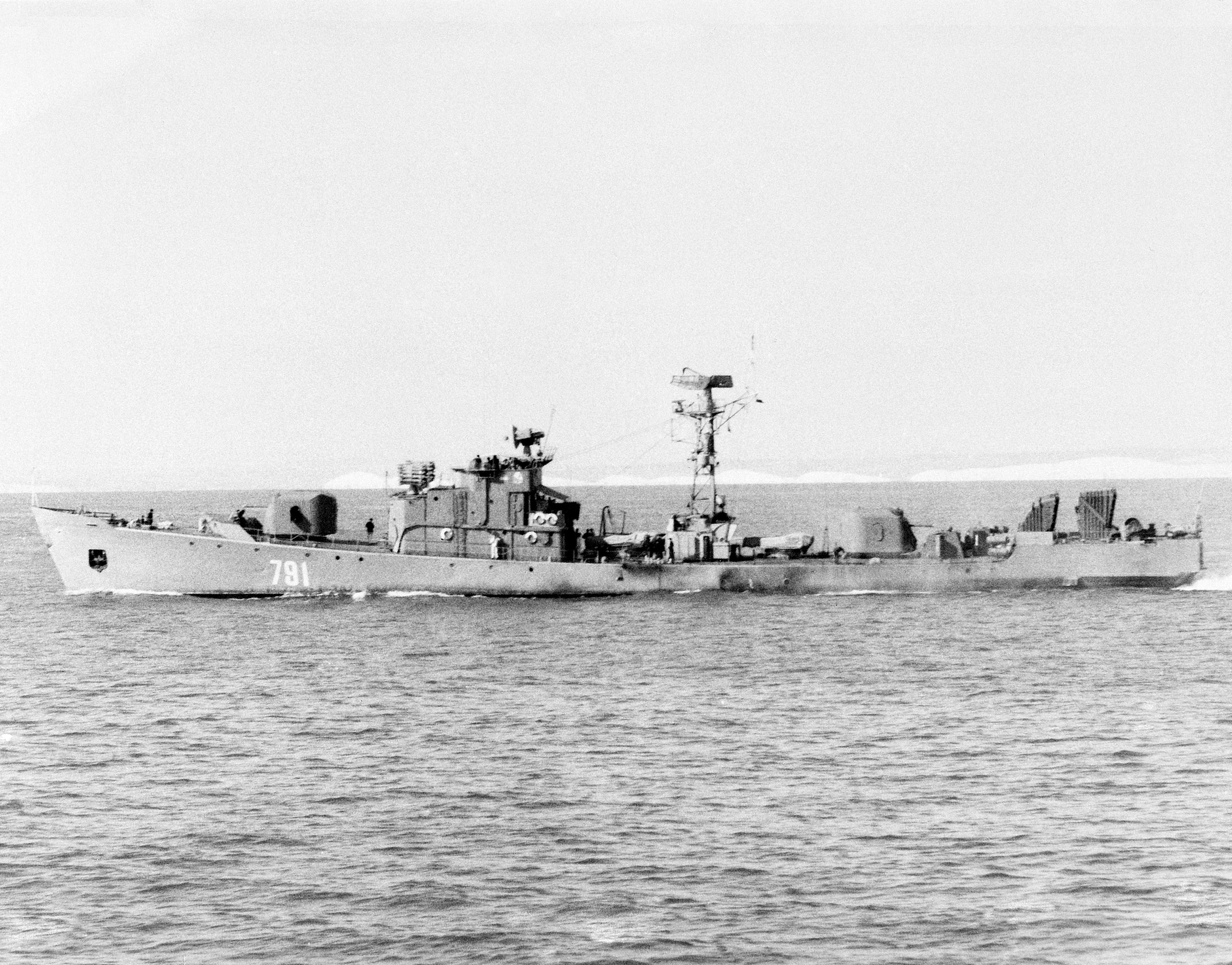
A Mirka II-class frigate

== See also ==
- List of ships of the Soviet Navy
- List of ships of Russia by project number
