= Petya-class frigate =

Soviet Navy light frigate class

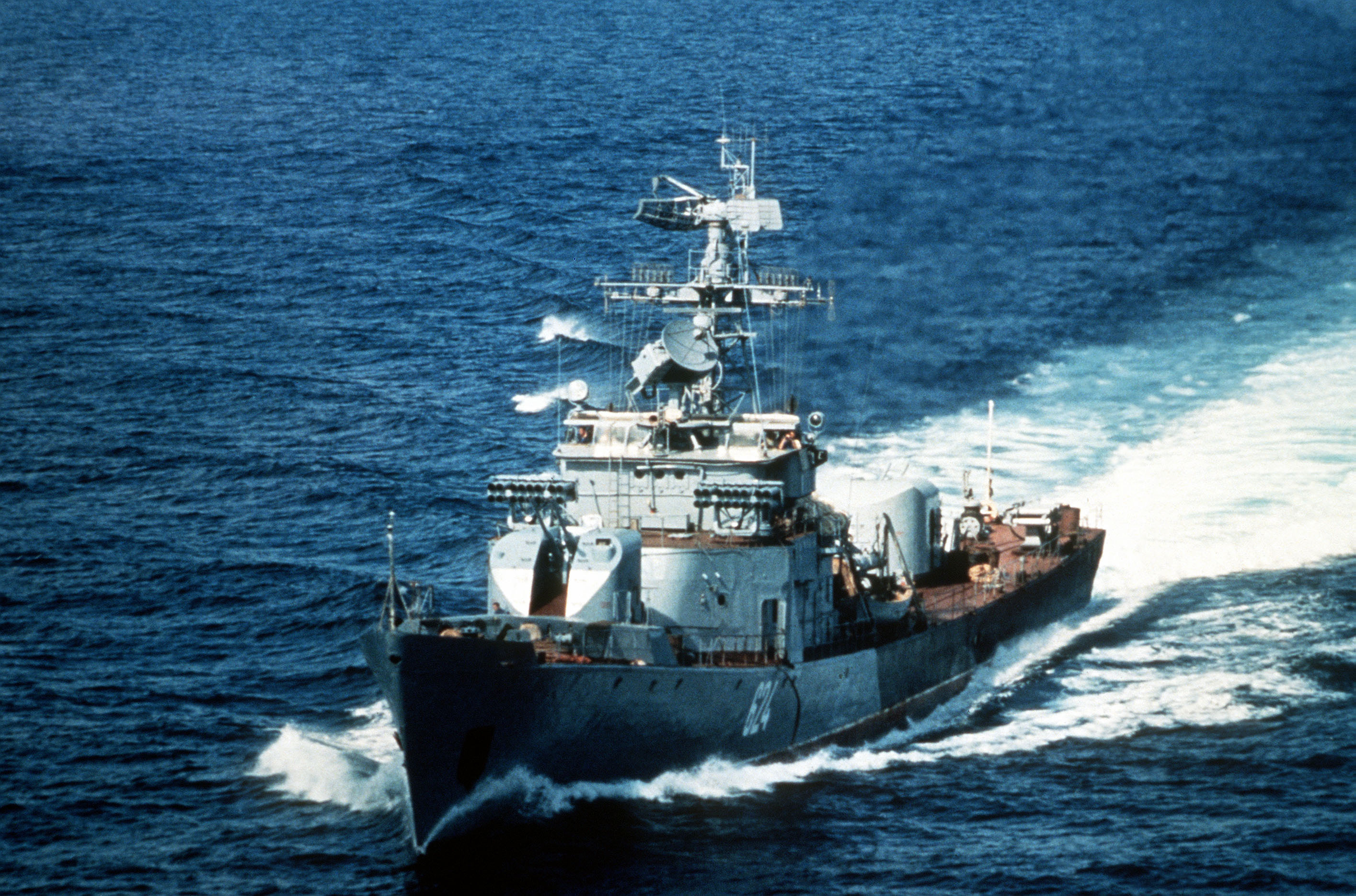
- A Petya-class frigate of the Soviet Navy in 1983

Class overview
- Name: Petya class (Project 159)
- Operators: Soviet Navy (historical); Azerbaijani Navy; Egyptian Navy (former); Ethiopian Navy (former); Indian Navy (former); Syrian Navy (former); Ukrainian Navy (former); Vietnam People's Navy
- Preceded by: Riga class
- Succeeded by: Mirka class
- Subclasses: Arnala-class corvettes
- Completed: 54
- Active: 6
- Laid up: 1 (uncertain)
- Retired: 48

General characteristics
- Type: Frigate
- Displacement: 950 tons (standard); 1,150 tons (full load)
- Length: 81.8 m (268 ft 4 in)
- Beam: 9.2 m (30 ft 2 in)
- Draught: 2.9 m (9 ft 6 in)
- Propulsion: 2 shaft CODAG; 2 gas turbines - 30,000 hp (22,000 kW); 1 diesel - 6,000 hp (4,500 kW)
- Speed: 30 knots (56 km/h; 35 mph)
- Range: 4,870 nautical miles (9,020 km; 5,600 mi) at 10 knots (19 km/h; 12 mph); 450 nautical miles (830 km; 520 mi) at 30 knots (56 km/h; 35 mph)
- Complement: 90
- Sensors & processing systems: Radar Don-2; Slim Net; Hawk Screech; Sonar - Herkules hull mounted & dipping sonar
- Armament: 4 76 mm (3 in) guns (2x2); 4 RBU-6000 anti-submarine rocket launchers (2 in some ships); 5 406 mm (16 in) anti-submarine torpedo tubes (10 tubes in some ships); export version had 1x3 533 mm (21 in) torpedo tubes

The Petya class was the NATO reporting name for a class of light frigates designed in the 1950s and built for the Soviet Navy in the 1960s. The Soviet designation was "Storozhevoi Korabl`" (Сторожевой Корабль - Sentry Ship) Project 159.

== Design ==
They were the first gas turbine-powered ships in the Soviet Navy. The role of these ships was anti-submarine warfare in shallow waters and they were similar to the Mirka-class frigates. The specification (TTZ in Russian) was issued in 1955 and design approved in 1956. A three shaft machinery layout was chosen with the central shaft powered by diesel engines for economical cruising and the two wing shafts powered by gas turbines for speed. Gun armament was two twin AK-726 76 mm (3 in) gun turrets in "A" and "Y" positions which were controlled by a single radar director. Anti-submarine armament consisted of four RBU-6000 anti-submarine rocket launchers and a launcher for 406 mm (16 in) anti-submarine torpedoes. Some of the ships designed for export replaced the 406 mm torpedo tubes with anti-shipping 533 mm (21 in) torpedo tubes. A comprehensive sonar suite including VDS was fitted.

== Ships ==
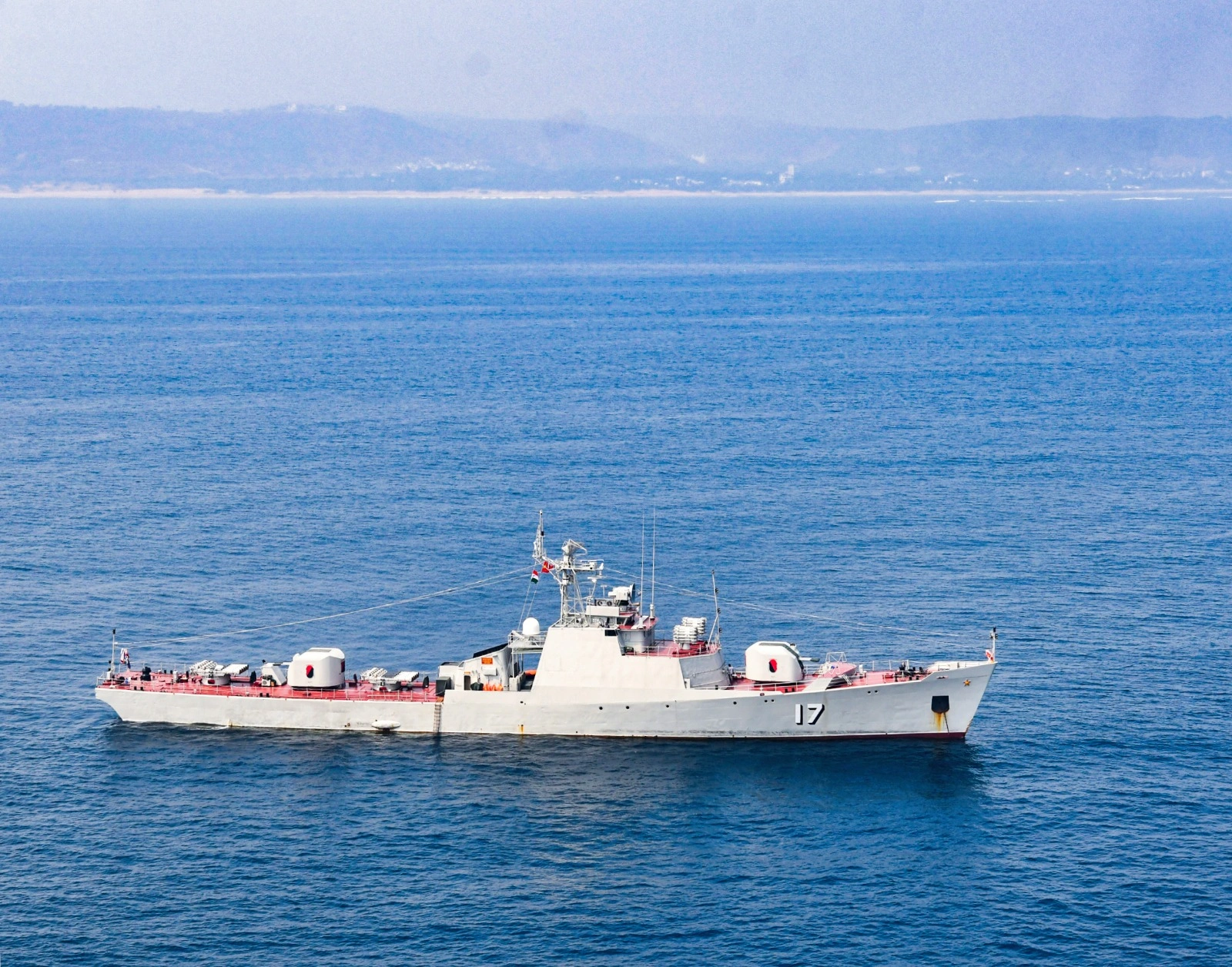
Upgraded Petya class corvette VPNS-17 of Vietnam during the International Fleet Review 2026

A total of 54 ships were built in two shipyards: the Kaliningrad Yantar shipyard built 22 ships including exports and Khabarovsk yard built 32 ships including exports. All Soviet ships were decommissioned in 1989-1992, with other ships continuing service with export customers. As of 2023, Vietnam and Azerbaijan still operate the type, with Vietnam operating five ships and Azerbaijan operating a single ship.

=== Export sales ===
- (Azerbaijan) Azerbaijani Navy - 1 ship
- (Egypt) Egyptian Navy - 4 ships acquired between 1965 and 1971, 1 sunk in combat in 1973, all decommissioned.
- (Ethiopia) Ethiopian Navy - 2 ships - sold for scrap in Djibouti following the independence of Eritrea
- (India) Indian Navy - 11 ships designated Arnala-class corvettes (all decommissioned). Classified as corvette due to smaller size and role of the ships. 1 ship ( INS Andaman ) lost at sea.
- Syrian Arab Navy - 2 ships were in service, in derelict condition at Tartus port. Probably retired in 2017 or 2018. 1 decommissioned Syrian frigate sunk by Russian air force (Probably by SU-34 with KH-35 air-launched missile) as a training target on 15 April 2018 off the coast of Syria. As of January 2022, the second frigate is no longer visible in Tartus, but may still be held as a hulk.
- (Ukraine) Ukrainian Navy - 1 ship. The pro-Ukrainian crew of a frigate SKR-112 made an independent transition from the Black Sea Fleet controlled by Moscow on July 21, 1992. She served until it was decommissioned in 1993.
- Vietnam People's Navy - 5 ships (still in service), being modernized with rebuilt stealthy superstructure and new combat suites.

== See also ==
- List of ships of the Soviet Navy
- List of ships of Russia by project number

Equivalent frigates of the same era

- Roofdier class
- Bergamini class
- Azopardo class
- Loch class
