= RBU-6000 =

Soviet anti-submarine rocket launcher

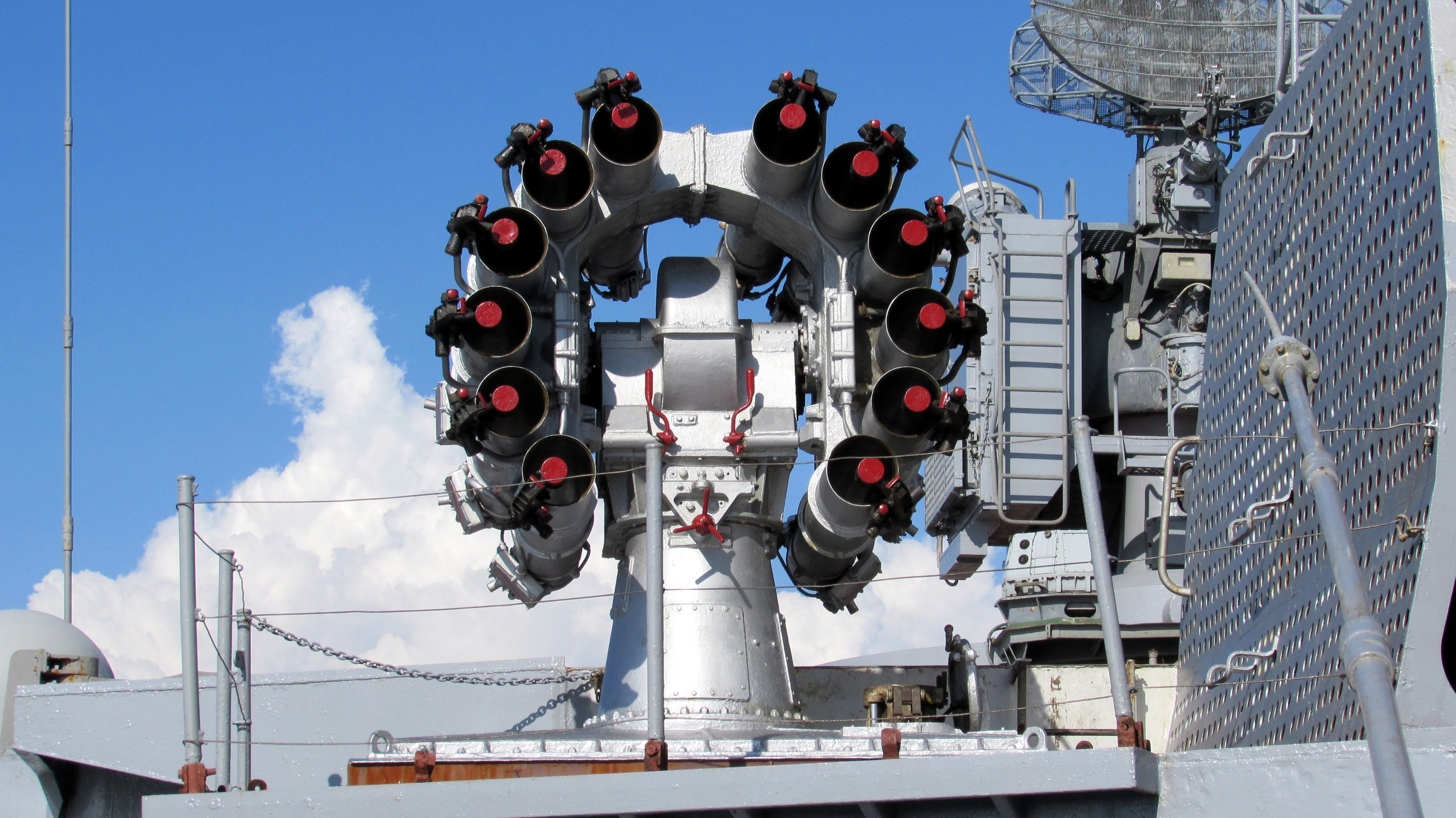
RBU-6000 system

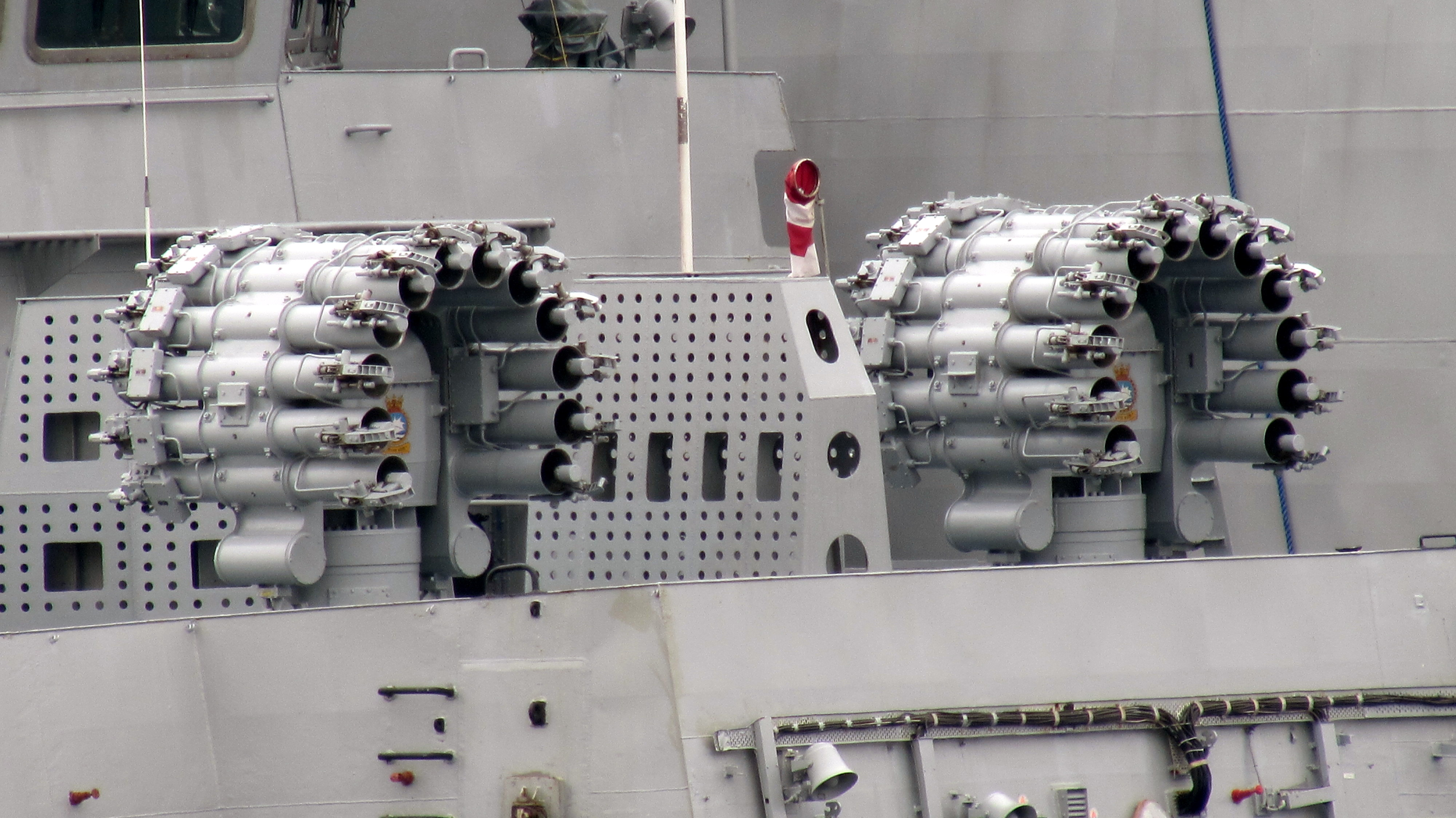
Indian corvette Kadmatt with two RBU-6000 launchers

The RBU-6000 Smerch-2 (Реактивно-Бомбовая Установка, Reaktivno-Bombovaja Ustanovka; rocket-bomb installation & Смерч; waterspout) is a 213 mm caliber Soviet anti-submarine rocket launcher. The system entered service in 1960–1961 and is fitted to a wide range of Russian surface vessels. It consists of a horseshoe-shaped arrangement of twelve launch barrels, that are remotely directed by the Burya fire control system (that can also control the shorter-ranged RBU-1000). It fires RGB-60 rockets, which carry unguided depth charges. The rockets are normally fired in salvos of 1, 2, 4, 8 or 12 rounds. Reloading is automatic, with individual rounds being fed into the launcher by the 60UP loading system from a below-deck magazine. Typical magazine capacity is either 72 or 96 rounds per launcher. It can also be used for shore bombardment.

The RPK-8 system is an upgrade of the RBU-6000 system, firing the 90R rocket, which releases a 90SG depth charge that is actively guided in the water. This allows it to home in on targets at depths of up to 1,000 metres (3,300 ft). The warhead is a 19.5-kilogram (43 lb) shaped charge, which enables it to punch through the hulls of submarines. It can also be used against divers and torpedoes. RPK-8 entered service in 1991 and was mounted on Project 1154 and 11356 frigates. Serial production of the upgraded 90R1 rocket, featuring a non-contact proximity fuze, was launched in 2017.

RBU-6000 were the most widespread anti-submarine rocket launchers in the Soviet Navy, used on many ship classes.

== Specifications ==
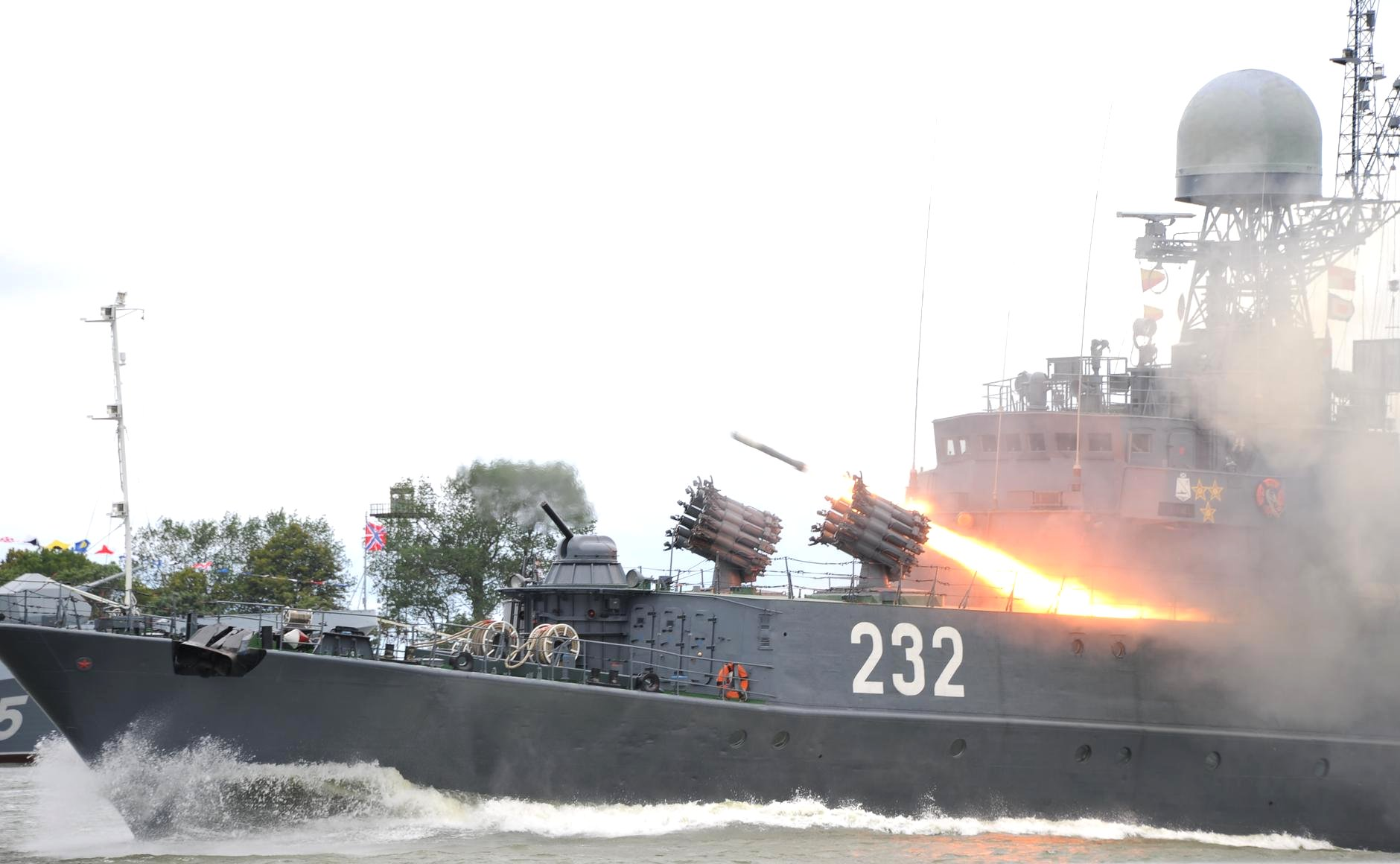
Russian corvette Kalmykia firing a RBU-6000 rocket depth charge

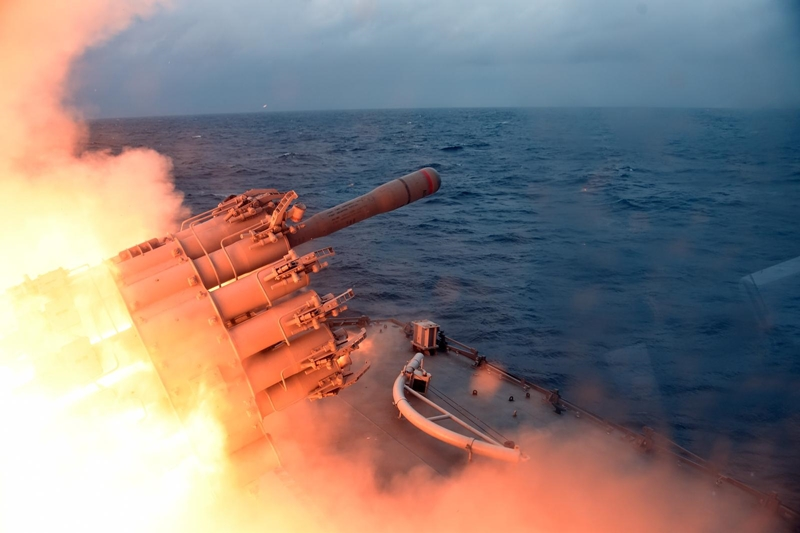
Indian Navy destroyer INS Chennai firing an RBU rocket.

=== Launcher specifications ===
Value	RBU-6000	RPK-8
Empty weight (kg)	3100	3500 + 4700 (autoloader)
Length (m)	2	
Height (m)	2.25	
Width (m)	1.75	
Elevation	-15° to +65°	
Traverse	180°	

=== Rocket specifications ===
All rockets are 212 mm in diameter.

Value	RGB-60	90R
Weight (kg)	113.5	112.5
Warhead	23 kg, explosive	19.5 kg, shaped
Range (m)	Ballistic 1: 350 m to 1700 m; Ballistic 2: 1500 m to 5500 m	600 m to 4,300 m
Target depth (m)	10 to 500 m	Submarines: 0 to 1,000 m; Torpedoes and divers: 4–10 m
Sink rate	11.6 m/s	Unknown
Seek radius	N/A (not homing)	130 m

Both versions of depth charges have contact and programmed fuse modes. The guided depth charge released by 90R has its own name, 90SG.

== Extended Range Anti-Submarine Rocket ==
In the 2020s, ARDE worked with the High Energy Materials Research Laboratory and the Naval Science and Technological Laboratory to create ERASR, an extended range version of the RGB-60 rocket that was previously employed in the RBU-6000 and its Indian equivalent, Indigenous Rocket Launchers (IRL). With its twin motor propulsion system, ERASR can launch the rocket 500–8,900 m (1,600–29,200 ft) in both short-range and long-range modes. On April 3, 2023, the rocket was successfully test fired from INS Chennai (D65).

The Indian Navy finished the ERASR user trials from the IRL aboard INS Kavaratti (P31) between June 27 and July 3, 2025. During the trials, 17 rockets at various ranges were successfully fired. Every trial goal, such as range performance, electronic time fuze operation, and warhead functioning, was successfully proved. The rocket system is being produced in collaboration with Solar Defence & Aerospace Limited and Bharat Dynamics Limited. The ERASR System is anticipated to be introduced by the Navy shortly.

== Ships ==
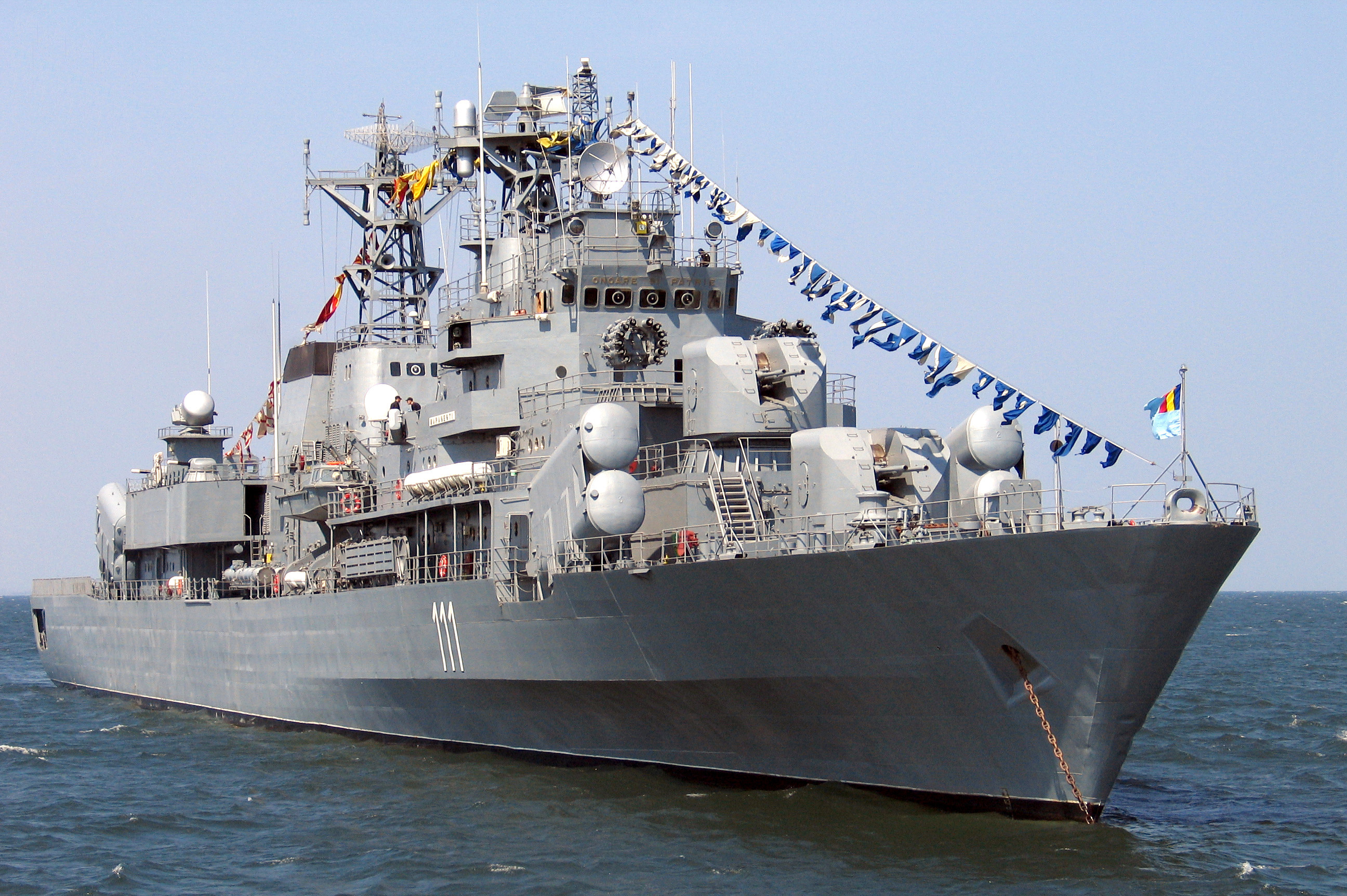
Two RBU-6000 rocket launchers aboard the Mărășeștiv

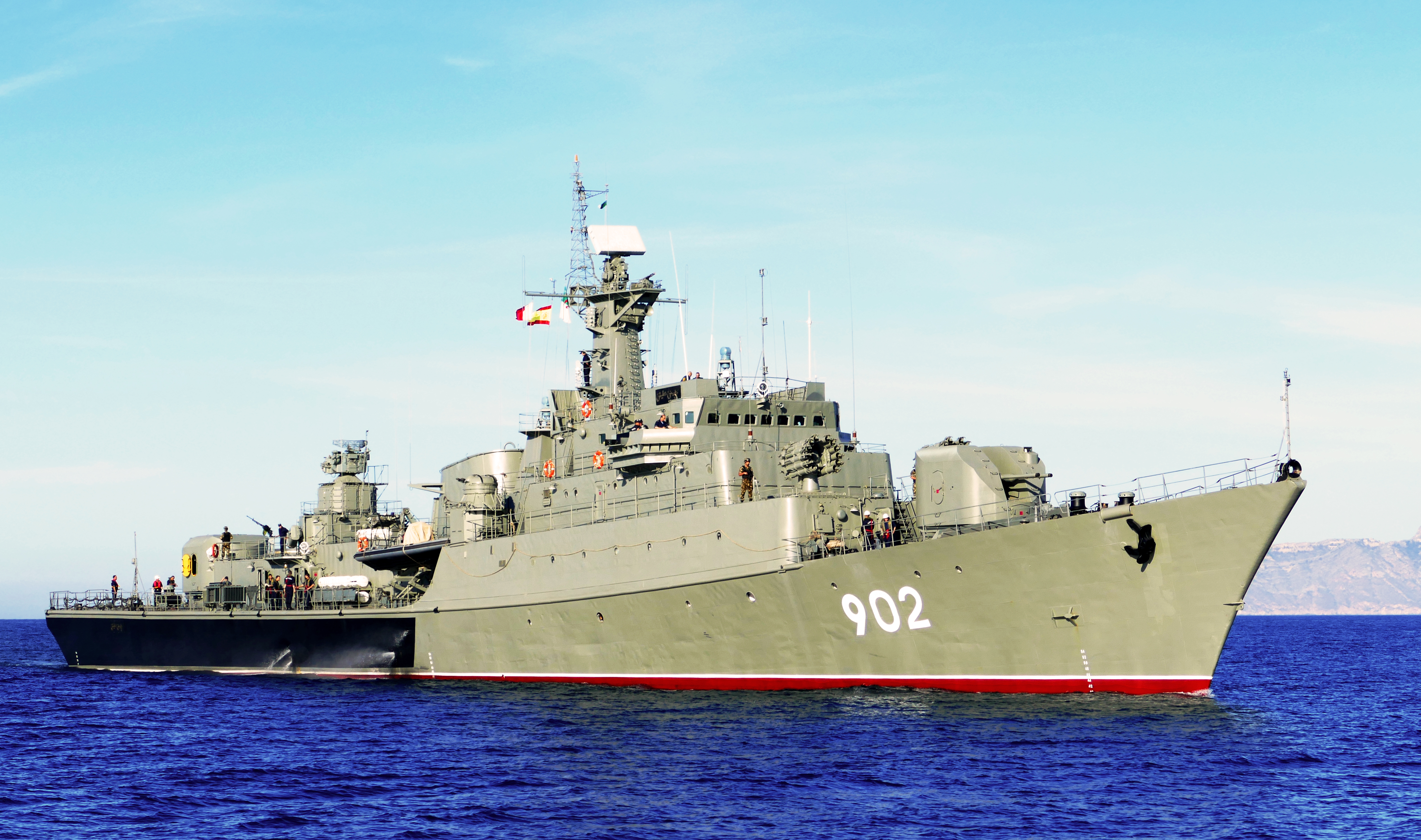
Two RBU-6000 rocket launchers aboard a Koni-class

Ship classes fitted with RBU-6000 (list not complete)

- Soviet Navy
  Russian Navy
  - Moskva-class helicopter carrier (Project 1123)
  - Kiev-class aircraft carrier (Project 1143/1143M)
  - Kynda-class cruiser (Project 58)
  - Kresta I-class cruiser (Project 1134)
  - Kresta II-class cruiser (Project 1134A)
  - Kara-class cruiser (Project 1134B)
  - Kirov-class battlecruiser (Project 1144/11442)
  - Slava-class cruiser (Project 1164)
  - Kotlin-SAM-class destroyer (Project 56K/56A/56AE)
  - Kanin-class destroyer (Project 57A)
  - Kashin-class destroyer (Project 61/61M/61MP)
  - Udaloy-class destroyer (Project 1155)
  - Burevestnik/Burevestnik M-class frigate (Project 1135/1135M)
  - Neustrashimy-class frigate (Project 1154)
  - Koni-class frigate (Project 1159)
  - Petya II/III-class frigate (Project 159A/159AE)
  - Mirka-class frigate (Project 35/35M)
  - Admiral Grigorovich-class frigate (Project 11356R)
  - Grisha I/III/IV/V-class corvette (Project 1124.1/1124M/1124K/1124ME)
  - Parchim II-class corvette (Project 133.1M)
  - Poti-class corvette (Project 204)
- Soviet border Guard
  Russian Border Guard
  - Nerei-class frigate (Project 11351)
- Polish Navy
  - ORP Kaszub corvette (Project 620)
- Romanian Naval Forces
  - Romanian frigate Mărăşeşti
  - Rear-Admiral Eustațiu Sebastian-class corvette
- Bulgarian Navy
  - Koni-class frigate (Project 1159)
- Azerbaijani Navy
  - Petya II-class frigate (Project 159A)
- Indian Navy
  - Rajput-class destroyer (Project 61ME)
  - Delhi-class destroyer (Project 15)
  - Kolkata-class destroyer (Project 15A)
  - Visakhapatnam-class destroyer (Project 15B)
  - Talwar-class frigate (Project 11356)
  - Shivalik-class frigate (Project 17)
  - Nilgiri-class frigate (Project 17A)
  - Kamorta-class corvette (Project 28)
  - ASW-SWC-class corvette
- Vietnam People's Navy
  - Petya II/III-class frigate (Project 159A/159AE)
- Indonesian Navy
  - Parchim I-class corvette (Project 133)
- Libyan Navy
  - Koni-class frigate (Project 1159TP)
- Algerian National Navy
  - Koni-class frigate (Project 1159T)
- Myanmar Navy
  - Thalun class frigate

== Armoured vehicles ==
- Russian Ground Forces
  - MT-LBs and T-80 chassis have been seen with the launcher complex fitted during the Russo-Ukrainian War.
  - Ural-4320 trucks have been reported with the launcher complex fitted during the Russo-Ukrainian War. Some were fitted with complete arrangement of twelve launch barrels, other with six or four barrels. Some of those vehicles were reported as destroyed by Ukrainian military and by ORYX.
