= Vladimir Bogdashin =

Soviet and Russian naval officer (1952–2021)

- Native name: Владимир Иванович Богдашин
- Born: 14 March 1952; Pugachyov, Saratov Oblast, Russian SFSR, Soviet Union
- Died: 22 July 2021 (aged 69) Moscow, Russia
- Buried: Troyekurovskoye Cemetery
- Allegiance: Soviet Union; Russia
- Branch: Soviet Navy; Russian Navy
- Service years: 1969–2007
- Rank: Rear Admiral
- Commands: Bezzavetnyy; Moskva; Moskva
- Awards: Order of the Red Star; Medal "For Battle Merit"; Medal "For Impeccable Service" First, Second and Third Classes

Vladimir Ivanovich Bogdashin (Russian: Владимир Иванович Богдашин; 14 March 1952 – 22 July 2021) was an officer of the Soviet and Russian navies. He reached the rank of rear admiral.

Bogdashin began his naval career with studies at the P. S. Nakhimov Black Sea Higher Naval School, graduating in 1974 and beginning a career-long association with the Black Sea and the Black Sea Fleet. Rising through the ranks with service on the cruiser Nikolayev, frigate Bezzavetnyy and destroyer Reshitelnyy, he took command of the Bezzavetnyy in 1983. He would win particular fame as commander of the Bezzavetnyy during the 1988 Black Sea bumping incident, when he used his ship to bump against United States Navy vessels which had entered Soviet territorial waters. Though his ship was smaller than the US vessel he collided with, he was able to inflict damage, and the US warships subsequently left Soviet waters. The incident was divisive at a time of détente under Mikhail Gorbachev, but Bogdashin's actions were approved of by the Soviet leadership, and he continued to receive awards and postings.

After studying at the Grechko Naval Academy, Bogdashin went on to command the helicopter carrier Moskva and the missile cruiser Moskva. He then became deputy head of the navy's Central Command Post for Combat Control, prior to his retirement in 2007 with the rank of rear admiral. In civilian life he was deputy director general of the managing company "GazPromService", and worked in the administration of the Chertanovo Tsentralnoye District in Moscow's Southern Administrative Okrug. Between 2011 and his retirement in 2017 he headed the Training and Research Centre of the Moscow Federation of Trade Unions.

== Early life and career ==
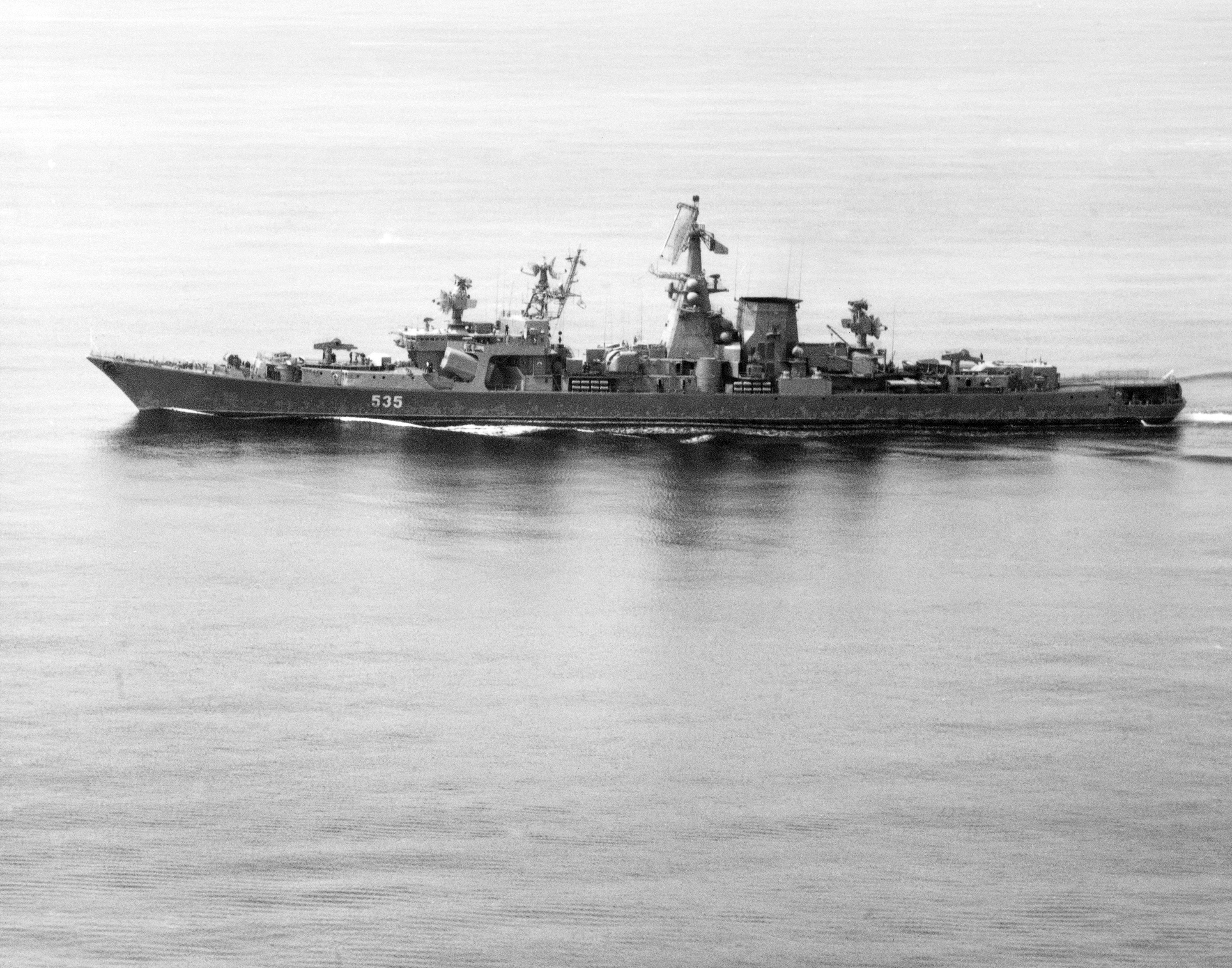
The Kara-class cruiser Nikolayev, Bogdashin's ship after his graduation from the P. S. Nakhimov Black Sea Higher Naval School

Bogdashin was born on 14 March 1952 into a Russian family in the town of Pugachyov, Saratov Oblast, in the Russian Soviet Federal Socialist Republic, in the Soviet Union. He worked for part of his youth on a collective farm, spending holidays visiting his mother's family who lived in Sevastopol, and here acquired a love for the sea and an interest in a naval career. In 1969 he entered the P. S. Nakhimov Black Sea Higher Naval School, graduating in 1974. He was assigned to serve on warships of the Black Sea Fleet, starting as the commander of an anti-aircraft missile battery on the Kara-class cruiser Nikolayev. After five years' service he became an assistant to the ship's commander, and a year later took the command officers' courses, in preparation for an appointment as second in command of a warship. He was however considered too young for the role and was instead appointed to the Krivak-class frigate Bezzavetnyy as commander of a weapons position consisting of two 9K33 Osa anti-aircraft missile systems and two AK-726 guns.

After a year on the Bezzavetnyy Bogdashin was transferred to the Kashin-class destroyer Reshitelnyy, which was due for modernization. Bogdashin and Reshitelnyy's crew were ordered to train Indian Navy crews in Poti for eight months. The Indian Navy was preparing to take delivery of an export version of the Kashin class. Bogdashin recalled how an arrangement was reached where the Soviet crew spent half a day instructing their Indian counterparts, and for half a day the Indian sailors assisted in repairing the Reshitelnyy. On the completion of the assignment he was appointed commander of his former ship, Bezzavetnyy, in 1983. He commanded her for the next five years, while also preparing to command one of the Moskva-class helicopter carriers.

== 1988 Black Sea bumping incident ==
=== Prelude ===
In 1986 the United States Navy cruiser USS Yorktown and destroyer USS Caron had entered Soviet territorial waters in the Black Sea, testing an interpretation of the law of innocent passage that was disputed by the Soviets. The event had caused controversy with Soviet naval officers, who regarded it as insult, but there was uncertainty over how to respond because of the Cold War thaw and rapprochement initiated by Mikhail Gorbachev.

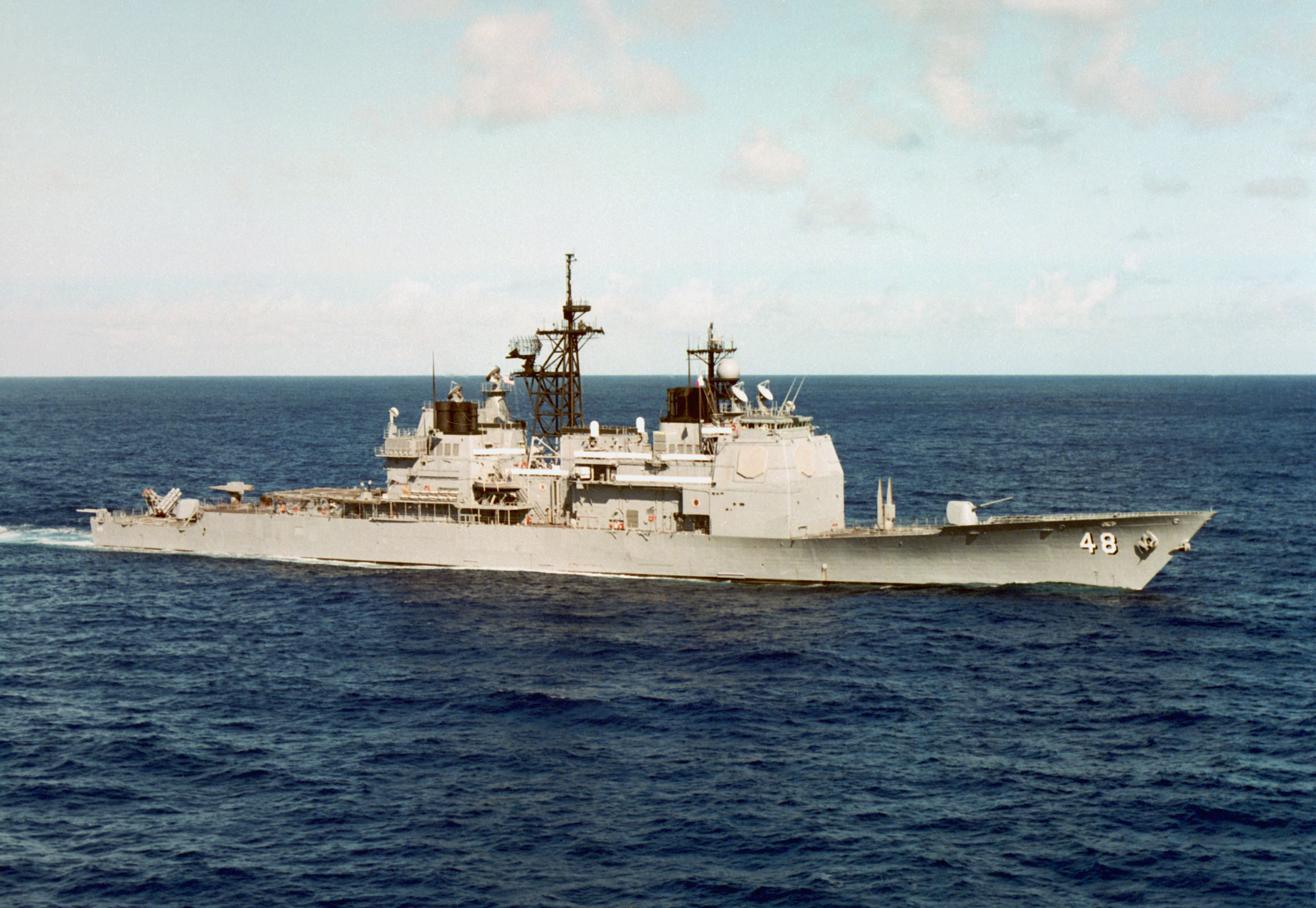
The United States Navy cruiser USS Yorktown, which had entered Soviet territorial waters in 1986, and was expected to do so again in 1988

On 11 February 1988 Bezzavetnyy, under the command of Captain 2nd Rank Bogdashin, returned to Sevastopol from a nearly-six month long cruise in the Mediterranean Sea. In preparation for a period in port, some of the ship's ammunition was unloaded, a third of the crew were given shore leave, and Bogdashin had meetings planned with veterans in the city. This was disrupted by a surprise order from fleet headquarters to put to sea at 6 in the morning of 12 February. Bogdashin accordingly took his ship to sea, leaving behind those crew members who were unable to rejoin in time, and received his orders at sea. The Bezzavetnyy sailed to the Turkish coast, rendezvousing with the Mirka-class frigate SKR-6 which had sailed from Bulgaria. Attempts to locate the US vessels were initially hampered by heavy traffic, thick fog, and the fact the US ships were observing radio silence. Their location was observed and passed on to the Soviet forces by Soviet merchant sailors aboard the ferry Geroi Shipka, which was transiting the Bosphorus at the time. With this information, Bogdashin located the US vessels and together with SKR-6, began to shadow them.

=== Bumping ===
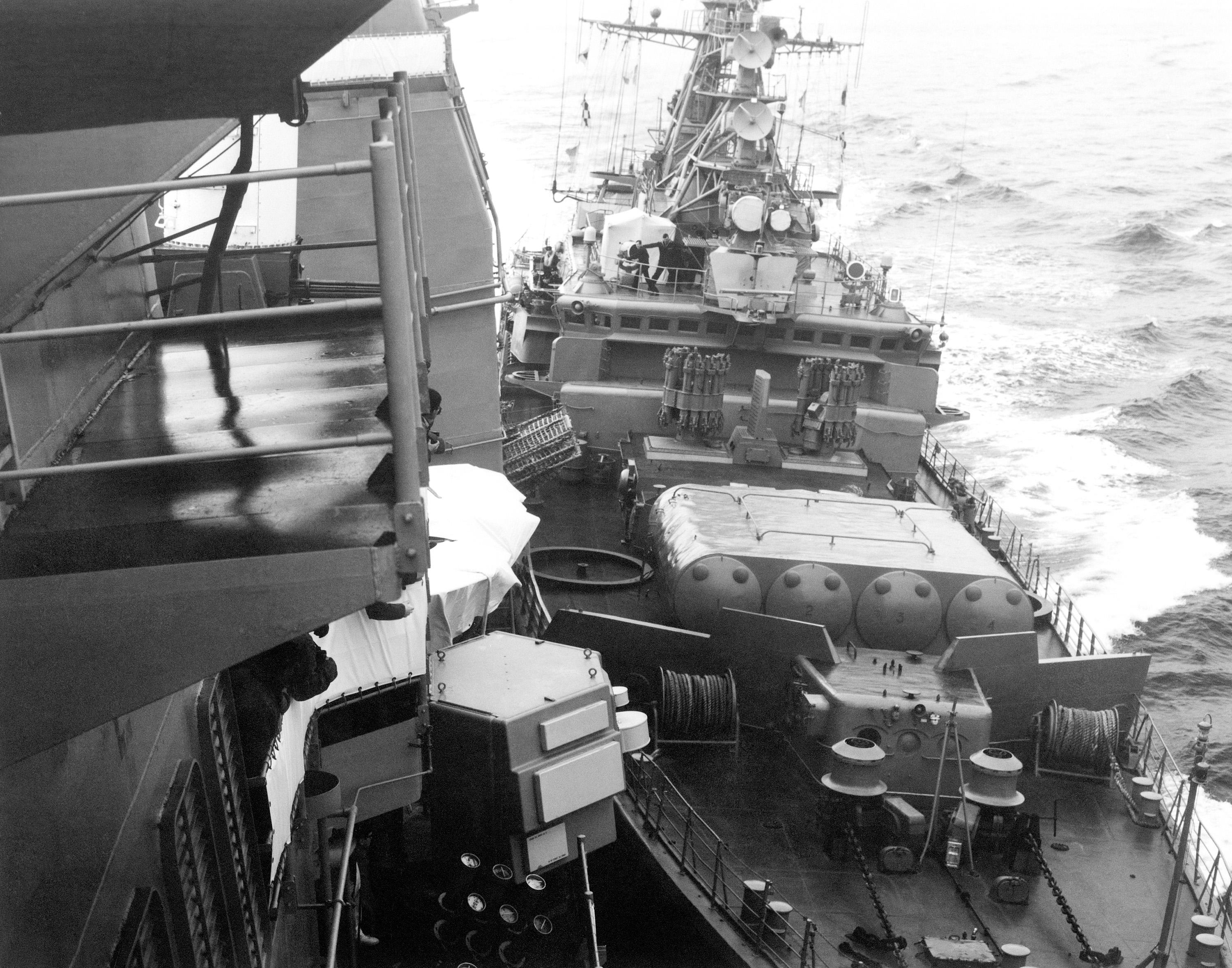
The Bezzavetnyy bumps against USS Yorktown

As the US vessels approached the Soviet coastline off Sevastopol, Bogdashin broadcast warnings that they were approaching Soviet territorial waters, and demanded they change course. Receiving the reply that they were not violating anything, Bogdashin prepared to use the ships to "bump" them, and turn them aside from their courses. He had hoped for the support of the auxiliary vessel Donbass, a large vessel with an ice-strengthened hull, but she was unable to make contact with the group. Instead, as the Caron crossed into Soviet waters, SKR-6 moved to bump the vessel. She made contact, but with her smaller bulk, was unable to effect much difference to the Caron. When the Yorktown also entered Soviet waters, Bogdashin accelerated his ship, and collided with the US cruiser. He later recalled that "the first blow was relatively light. With our starboard side, we hit the port side of Yorktown at speed. It was a sliding blow, we demolished the American gangway in the area of the navigating bridge. We received orders from the shore to withdraw and continue observation, but I could no longer do this." Bezzavetnyy then collided with the stern of the Yorktown, her bow scraping along the cruiser's stern, buckling the side plating, sweeping away the railings, and damaging the Harpoon missile launchers. The Bezzavetnyy's starboard anchor was dropped onto the Yorktown's deck, tore into the side plating, and was carried away.

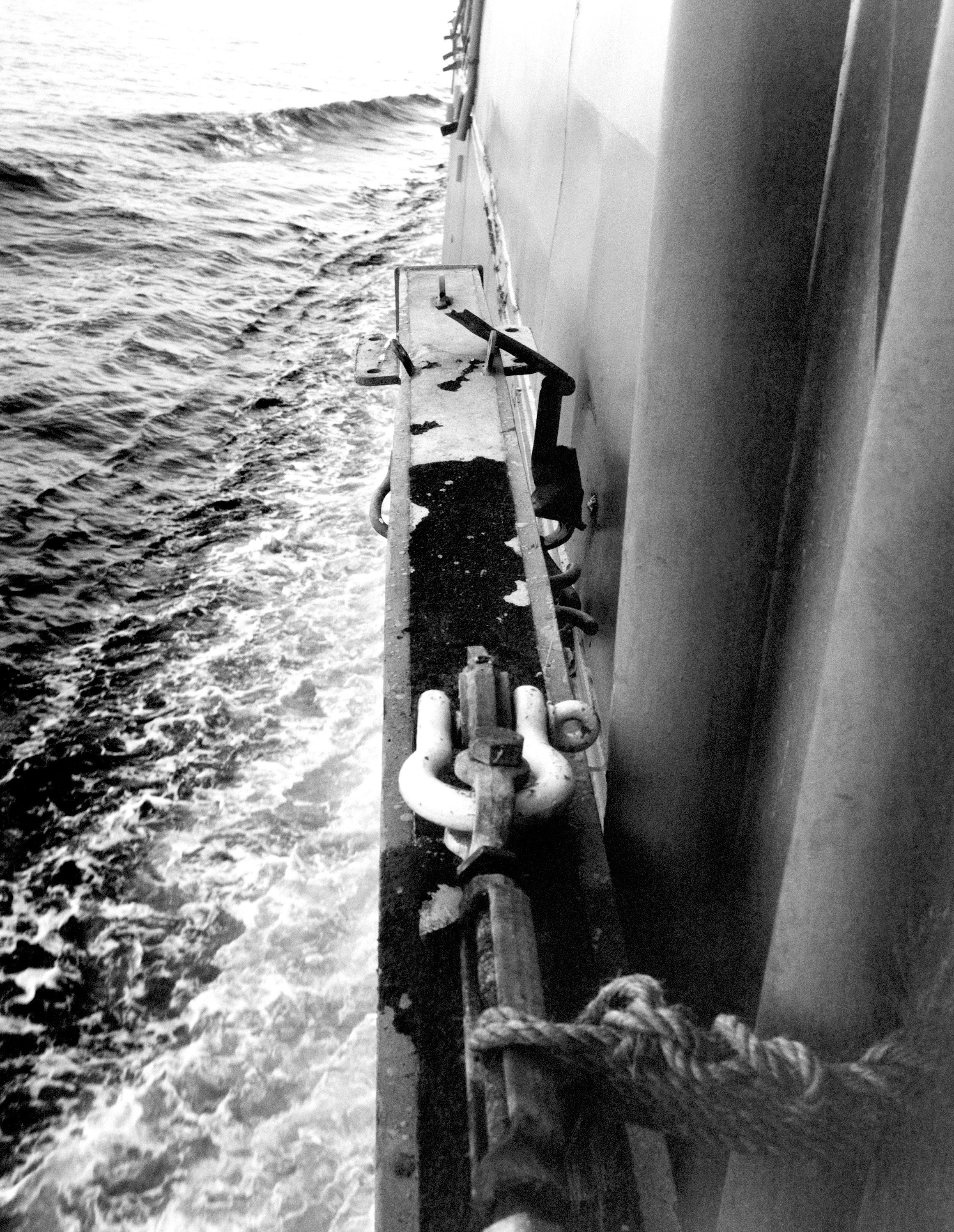
Damage to the Yorktown after the bumping

The two ships moved apart, with Bogdashin now facing the threat of the Caron, which manoeuvred to try to trap the Bezzavetnyy between herself and the Yorktown. The crew of the Yorktown attempted to launch their helicopter, but after the appearance of more Soviet ships and helicopters, and a warning that if launched, the helicopter would be shot down for violating Soviet airspace, abandoned the attempt. The US ships, shadowed by the Soviet forces, left Soviet waters and withdrew to the Bosphorus. Bogdashin recalled how the US sailors worked throughout the night to cut away damaged sections of the hull, and also how one of his michman had stood at the bow during the bumping with a rope, hoping to snare one of the Harpoon missiles. Having shadowed the US vessels clear of Soviet waters, Bogdashin returned the Bezzavetnyy to Sevastopol.

=== Aftermath ===
On his return to port Bogdashin learned that his actions had divided opinion within the Soviet leadership, with some demanding he be punished. He recalled how the fleet commander scolded him for losing an anchor, while the fleet's chief navigator was concerned that Bogdashin had violated the International Rules for Preventing Collisions of Vessels at Sea. Bogdashin was summoned to Moscow a couple of days later. Bogdashin recalled that "Later I learned that my fate was finally decided by the chairman of the KGB of the USSR, Chebrikov. It was he who reported to Gorbachev that I did everything right. [Gorbachev] did not object."

== Later Soviet and Russian Navy career ==
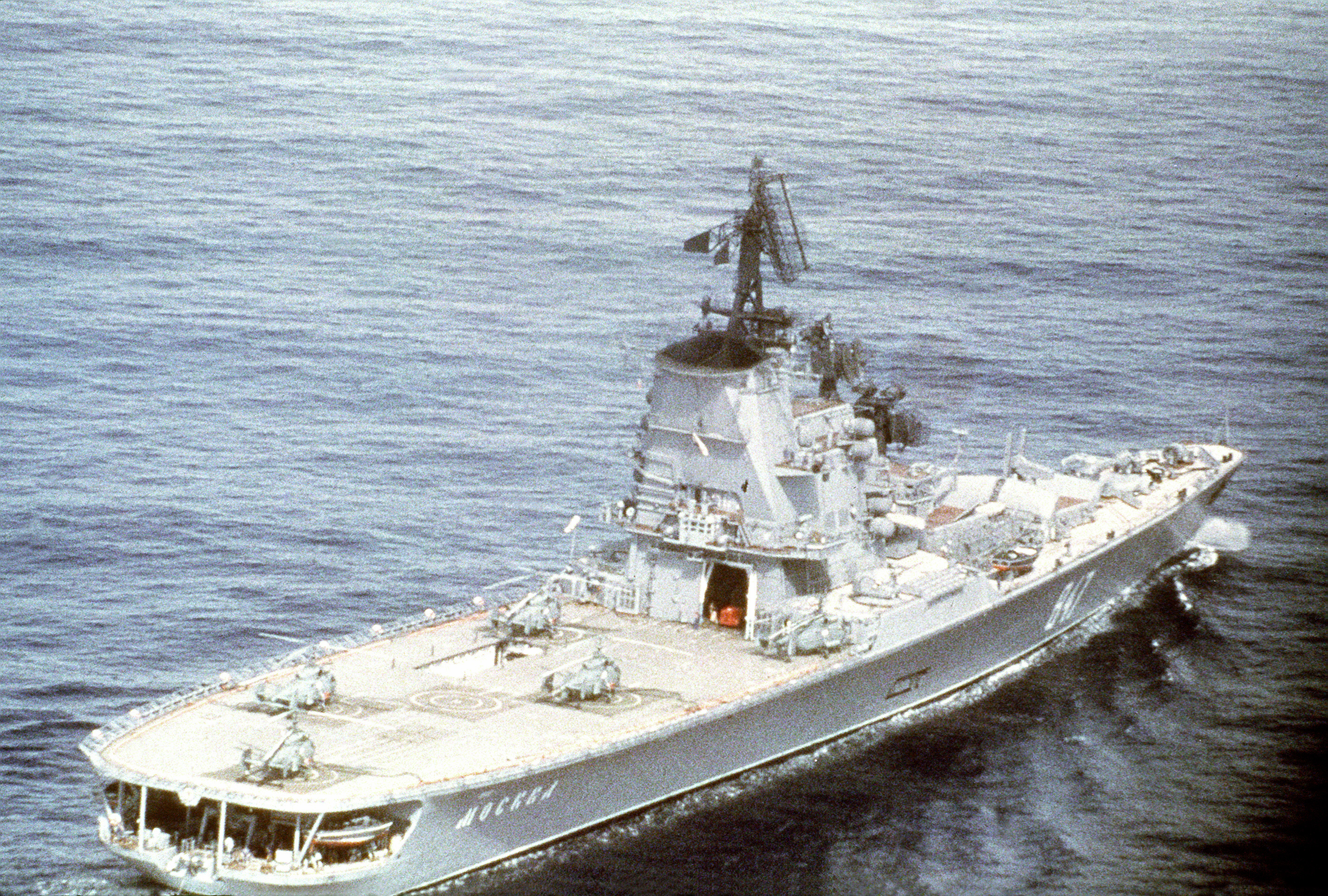
The helicopter carrier Moskva, Bogdashin's command from 1991

Following the incident, Bogdashin was quickly removed from the fleet for a period by being appointed a delegate to the 19th All-Union Conference of the Communist Party of the Soviet Union. On its conclusion he was sent to Leningrad for a two-year course of study at the Grechko Naval Academy. On graduating in 1990, was awarded the Order of the Red Star. Officially this was for his success on the course "mastering new military equipment", but the officer presenting the award, the head of faculty, added "we all know what this award is for." In 1991 Bogdashin received the title of Honoured Specialist of the Armed Forces of the USSR, the same year as he was given command of the helicopter carrier Moskva. This was followed by an appointment in 1996 to command a different ship of the same name, the missile cruiser Moskva. From 1998 to 1999 he was deputy commander of the 30th Division of anti-submarine ships of the Black Sea Fleet, based at Sevastopol.

In 1999, Bogdashin became deputy head of the navy's Central Command Post for Combat Control. Bogdashin retired from military service in 2007. He entered civilian life as deputy director general of the managing company GazPromService, and worked in the administration of the Chertanovo Tsentralnoye District in Moscow's Southern Administrative Okrug. Between 2011 and his retirement in 2017 he headed the Training and Research Centre of the Moscow Federation of Trade Unions. In addition to various awards and medals, including the Medal "For Battle Merit", he was also an honorary citizen of Tatsinsky District, in Rostov Oblast.

Bogdashin died from COVID-19 in Moscow on 22 July 2021. He was 69 years old. He was buried in the Alley of Admirals in Moscow's Troyekurovskoye Cemetery on 27 July, shortly after Russia's Navy Day. He was married to Olga Leonidovna, and had two children; a son Dmitry who graduated from the S. M. Kirov Military Medical Academy and served as chief medical officer on a submarine, before returning to the Medical Academy as head of the resuscitation and anesthesiology department at the Department of Traumatology and Orthopedics; and a daughter, Dasha, a graduate of the University of Finance and Economics.
