= Ukrainian corvette Chernihiv =

Grisha II-class corvette

History

Soviet Union
- Name: Izmail; (Ізмаїл)
- Namesake: Izmail
- Builder: Zelenodolsk Shipyard, Zelenodolsk
- Yard number: 777
- Laid down: 12 September 1978
- Launched: 22 June 1980
- Commissioned: 28 December 1980
- Decommissioned: June 1992
- Identification: See Pennant numbers
- Fate: Transferred to Ukraine, 1992

Ukraine
- Name: Chernihiv; (Чернігів)
- Namesake: Chernihiv
- Commissioned: 19 January 1996
- Decommissioned: 2005
- Renamed: Izmail, 2004
- Identification: Pennant number: U205
- Fate: Sunk in 2010

General characteristics
- Class & type: Grisha II-class corvette
- Displacement: standard 830 tons, full load 990 tons
- Length: 71.2 m (233 ft 7 in)
- Beam: 10.1 m (33 ft 2 in)
- Draught: 3.8 m (12 ft 6 in)
- Propulsion: 3 shaft, 2 × М-507А cruise diesels, 28,000 kW (38,000 shp), (2 shafts); 1 × М-8М boost gas turbine 13,000 kW (18,000 shp), (1 shaft); Electric Plant: 1×DG-500 (500 kW), 1×DG-300 (300 kW), 1×DG-200 (200 kW)
- Speed: 35 knots (65 km/h; 40 mph)
- Range: 2,500 nautical miles (4,600 km; 2,900 mi) at 14 knots (26 km/h; 16 mph)
- Endurance: 9 days
- Complement: 79 (9 chiefs)
- Sensors & processing systems: Radar: MR-302 Rubka air/surface search radar; MR-1031 AK-725 fire control radar; Don-2 navigation radar; Sonar: MGK-322T Argun'/Bull Horn low-frequency hull-mounted sonar; MGK-339T Shelon'/Elk Tail medium-frequency through-hull dipping sonar
- Electronic warfare & decoys: Bizan-4B suite with Watch Dog intercept, 2 PK-16 decoy RL
- Armament: artillery: 2×2 57mm AK-725 gun mount (1,000 rounds); antisubmarine: 2 twin 533 mm torpedo tubes DTA-5E-1124; 2 RBU-6000 A/S rocket launchers (96 rockets); 2 depth charge racks (12 depth charges); Up to 18 mines in place of depth charges

Chernihiv (U205) was a Grisha II-class anti-submarine corvette of the Ukrainian Navy. Prior to joining the Ukrainian Navy she was a former Soviet Navy corvette named Izmail.

== Development and design ==
The 1124P project corvette (NATO reporting name: Grisha I class, Soviet classification: MPK-147 class Russian: МПК-147) were intended to counter enemy submarines in nearby area of naval bases, ports and scattered berths, on the deployment of naval forces to carry out anti-submarine surveillance and protection of ships and vessels at sea.

Project 1124 of the first series were armed with SAM Osa-M in the bow of the hull. One twin AK-725 gun was located in the stern. Control of firing AK-725 was carried out by the MR-103 Leopard radar with a maximum detection range of 40 km, which was also located on the stern superstructure. The MR-302 Rubka radar was installed as a radar for detecting air and surface targets on the ship's mast. The basis of the sonar consisted of submersible GAS MG-322 Argun (operated in echo direction-finding mode) and lowered GAS MG-339 Shelon in the stern superstructure, which operated only in the "stop" mode. The basis of anti-submarine weapons were located two twin torpedo tubes for DTA-5E-1124 and two RBU-6000 on the bow of the ship's superstructure.

Construction of small anti-submarine ships on Project 1124 began in 1967 at the Zelenodolsk Shipyard. A total of twelve ships of this project were built, after which they were replaced by the corvettes of Project 1124 of the second series (Grisha-III according to NATO reporting name).

== Construction and career ==
The corvette Izmail was laid down on 12 December 1978 at the Zelenodolsk Shipyard, Zelenodolsk. The ship was launched on 22 June 1980. The ship was relocated to Balaklava to undergo sea trial and commissioned on 28 December 1980.

=== Service in the Soviet Border Troops ===
Izmail was assigned to the 5th separate Balaklava brigade of border patrol ships of the Western Central Committee of the KGB of the USSR. The flag of the Naval Border Troops was raised on the ship on 17 February 1981. The corvette participated in the protection of the state border, the economic zone of the USSR and fishing off the coast of the Crimean peninsula in the Black Sea. From 1981 to 1989 the vessel served in the army for 1,053 days. Izmail inspected 5,459 vessels, detained 296 of them, including 14 foreign schooners. Twice, on 10 March 1986, and 12 February 1988, as part of the KUG, together with ships of the Black Sea Fleet, the corvette took part in the expulsion from territorial waters a detachment of US Navy warships (cruiser USS Yorktown and destroyer USS Caron).

In April 1986, as part of the PSKR group (Izmail, MG-7, MPK-105), while searching for a foreign transmitter in the area of Cape Tarkhankut, the vessel established contact with an unidentified submarine (as it later became known TCG Yıldıray) and accompanied the sub for 22 hours. Komsomolets of Georgia and Kyiv Komsomolets accompanied the boat to the Port of Eregli.

In June 1992, he became a member of the Naval Units of the State Border Protection Committee of Ukraine, where the corvette also actively participated in the protection of the state border. In February 1992, the ship detained the first Turkish schooner, Chinakchi-Oğulları, which poached flounder in the Ukrainian economic zone. Until 1996, Izmail repeatedly participated in operations against foreign poachers.

=== Service in the Ukrainian Navy ===
At the end of 1995, a decision was made at the governmental level to transfer the Project 1124P ships to the Ukrainian Navy by the State Border Guard Service of Ukraine. In January 1996, Izmail together with the Dnipro were transferred to the Ukrainian Navy. The ships were accepted in a satisfactory technical condition: given the specifics of the maritime border service, the ships rarely used sonar equipment, mine and torpedo weapons. Only the mechanical running gear and the armament of the missile and artillery combat unit were actively used.

The Ukrainian naval flag was hoisted on the ship on 19 January 1996. The ship was reclassified into a corvette and renamed Chernihiv. The change of the ship's name was agreed with the Chernihiv City Administration, whose representatives arrived in Sevastopol on 19 January to congratulate the sailors on raising the battle flag. The consecration of the flag of Chernihiv took place on the same day on the feast of the Epiphany. For some time, both border and naval crews were on the ship. Officers, midshipmen and sailors for the Chernihiv crew were recruited from various ships, as well as from other types of retrained Armed Forces.

Due to lack of funding and the impossibility of dock repairs, the Chernihiv was excluded from the fleet and written off in 2005. Before the ship was written off, the name Izmail was returned, and the name Chernihiv was given to the minesweeper of the Project 266M. The corvette was sold as scrap ferrous and non-ferrous metals of OJSC MetProm. In April 2010, she sank while dismantling a hull in Lake Donuzlav.

=== Pennant numbers ===
Date	Pennant number
1980	051
1981	012
1984	014
1987	149
1990	011
