= Soviet destroyer Reshitelny =

Reshitelny is the name of the following ships of the Soviet Navy:

- Soviet destroyer Reshitelny (1940), a Gnevny-class destroyer transferred to China in 1955, became a museum ship in 1990
- Soviet destroyer Reshitelny (1966), a Kashin-class destroyer in commission 1967–1996, scrapped in 1999

== See also ==
- Russian destroyer Reshitel'nyi, an Imperial Russian Navy destroyer captured by Japan
