= Ukrainian frigate Mykolaiv =

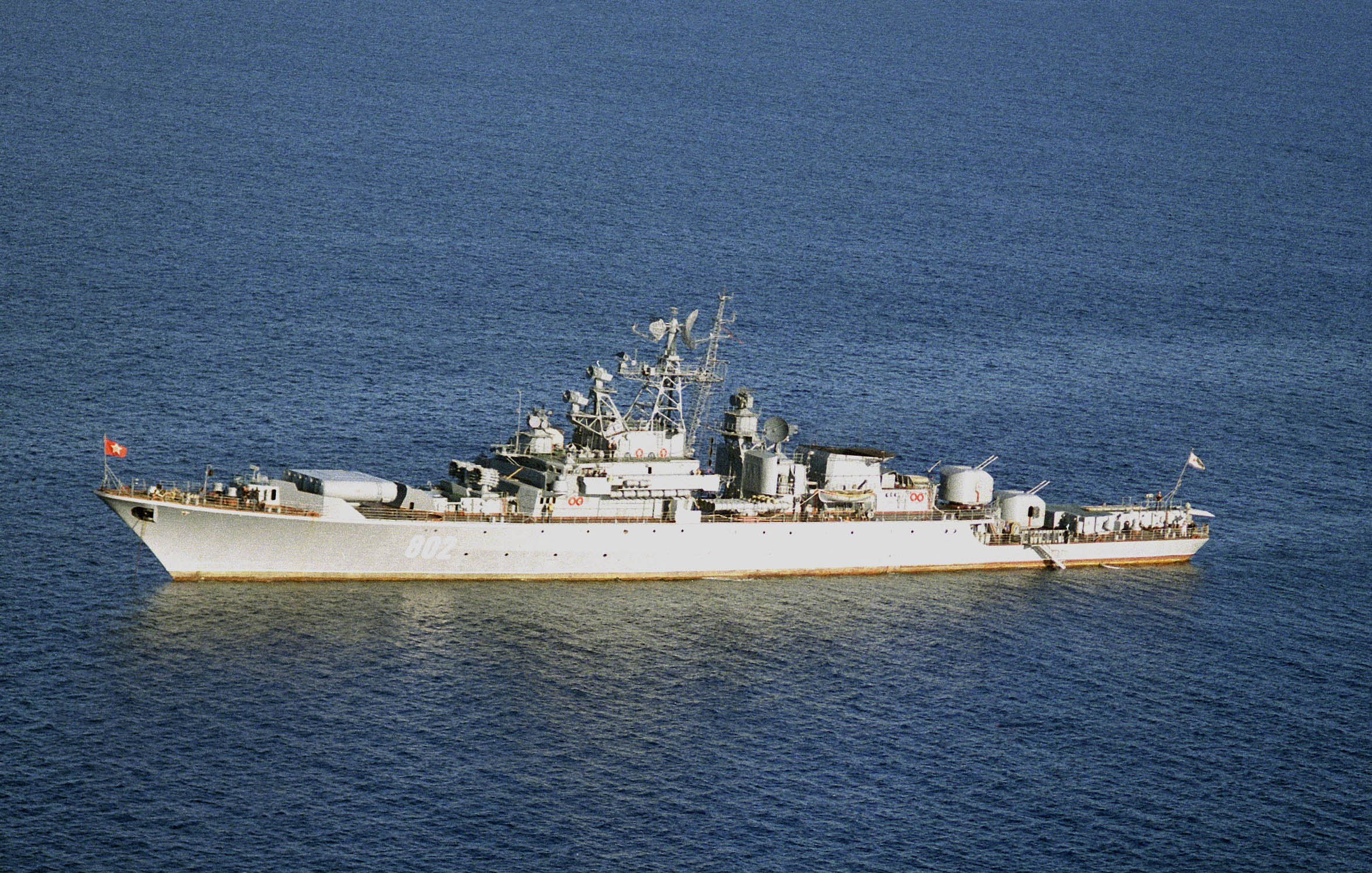
- Bezukoriznennyy in Mediterranean in 1989

History

→ Soviet Union → Russia
- Name: Bezukoriznennyy
- Ordered: 12 July 1978
- Builder: Zaliv Shipbuilding yard (Kerch)
- Yard number: 14
- Launched: 3 June 1979
- Commissioned: 29 December 1979
- Fate: Transferred to Ukraine on 1 August 1997

Ukraine
- Name: Mykolaiv
- Acquired: 1 August 1997
- Decommissioned: 2001
- Renamed: 1997
- Reclassified: "Technical property" (2001)
- Identification: U133
- Fate: Cut to pieces in 2001 at Vtorchermet

General characteristics
- Class & type: Burevestnik-class frigate
- Displacement: 3,200 tons
- Length: 405.3 ft (123.5 m)
- Beam: 46.3 ft (14.1 m)
- Draft: 15.1 ft (4.6 m)
- Propulsion: 2 shaft; COGAG; 2 x M-8k gas-turbines, 40,000 shp (30,000 kW); 2 x M-62 gas-turbines (cruise), 14,950 shp (11,150 kW)
- Speed: 32 knots (59 km/h; 37 mph)
- Range: 4,995 nmi (9,251 km; 5,748 mi) at 14 knots (26 km/h; 16 mph)
- Complement: 200
- Sensors & processing systems: Radar: 1 MR-755 Fregat-M/Half Plate air/surface search; Sonar: Zvezda-2 suite with MGK-345 Bronza/Ox Yoke bow mounted LF, Ox Tail LF VDS; Fire Control: Purga ASW combat system, 2 Drakon/Eye Bowl SSM targeting, 2 MPZ-301 Baza/Pop Group
- Electronic warfare & decoys: Start suite with Bell Shroud intercept, Bell Squat jammer, 4 PK-16 decoy RL, 8 PK-10 decoy RL, 2 towed decoys
- Armament: 1 × 4 URK-5 (SS-N-14 'Silex') SSM/ASW missiles; 2 × Osa-MA (SA-N-4'Gecko') SAM (40 missiles); 4 × 76 mm guns (2×2); 2 × quad 533 mm torpedo tubes

The Ukrainian frigate Mykolaiv was a former Soviet frigate (guard ship) Bezukoriznennyy of the Burevestnik-class (NATO codename: Krivak I) ship built for the Soviet Navy in the late 1970s.

== Service history ==
=== Ukrainian service ===
In summer of 1997 during the division of the Black Sea fleet she was transferred to the Ukrainian Navy, receiving the name of Mykolaiv.

=== Fate ===
Mykolaiv was decommissioned in 2001 and was cut into pieces at Vtorchermet in 2001.

== See also ==
- Ukrainian frigate Dnipropetrovsk
