= 1988 Black Sea bumping incident =

Episode in the Cold War

- Date: February 12, 1988
- Time: 10:02 a.m. (MSK)
- Location: Black Sea; 44.25°N 33.59°E
- Target: United States Navy vessels: USS Yorktown; USS Caron
- Perpetrators: Soviet Navy vessels: Bezzavetny; Soviet frigate SKR-6
- Outcome: Passing of the US/USSR Joint Statement on Uniform Acceptance of Rules of International Law Governing Innocent Passage

The Black Sea bumping incident of 12 February 1988 occurred when American cruiser USS Yorktown and destroyer USS Caron exercised the right of innocent passage through Soviet territorial waters in the Black Sea during the Cold War. The cruiser was bumped by the Soviet frigate Bezzavetny, which aimed to push Yorktown into international waters. The destroyer was intentionally shouldered by SKR-6, a Soviet Mirka-class frigate. Yorktown reported minor damage to her hull, with no holing or risk of flooding. Caron was undamaged.

At the time, the Soviet Union recognized the right of innocent passage for warships in its territorial waters solely in designated sea lanes. The United States believed that there was no legal basis for a coastal nation to limit warship transits to sea lanes only. Subsequently, the U.S. Department of State found that the Russian-language text of the United Nations Convention on the Law of the Sea, Article 22, paragraph 1 allowed the coastal state to regulate the right of innocent passage whenever necessary, while the English-language text did not. After the incident, the Soviet Union agreed to resolve the issue of innocent passage in Soviet territorial waters.

== Background ==
In 1979, the United States launched an informal program to promote the "rights and freedoms of navigation and overflight guaranteed to all nations under international law". The US government said that it initiated the program because some countries were beginning to assert jurisdictional boundaries beyond traditional claims. The United States wished to stop this and, it said, diplomatic protests had seemed to be ineffective. A new customary international law could emerge if nations avoided operating their ships and aircraft in the disputed areas, and the US saw this as undesirable.

In the 1980s, US warships were passing through the straits from the Mediterranean into the Black Sea two or three times a year to "show the flag" and to claim the right of innocent passage in the coastal states. Aside from the right of free passage, US naval activity in the Black Sea served the purpose of upholding US rights under the 1936 Montreux Convention Regarding the Regime of the Straits. According to a US government official, "the Dardanelles and the Bosporus form an international waterway" under that convention and "if you don't periodically reaffirm your rights you find that they're hard to revive".

Meanwhile, "The Rules of Navigation and Sojourn of Foreign Warships in the Territorial Waters and Internal Waters and Ports of the USSR", enacted by the Soviet Council of Ministers in 1983, acknowledged the right of innocent passage of foreign warships only in restricted areas of Soviet territorial waters in the Baltic, Sea of Okhotsk and the Sea of Japan; no sea lanes for innocent passage in the Black Sea were designated. Soviet vessels and aircraft were routinely dispatched to observe US warships there.

After the 1986 incident in the Black Sea, also involving USS Yorktown and USS Caron, a meeting of the Soviet Defence Council was held later in the same year. At the meeting, the Commander-in-Chief of the Soviet Navy Vladimir Chernavin suggested to Mikhail Gorbachev, Defense Minister Sergey Sokolov, Foreign Minister Eduard Shevardnadze, and other senior officials that intruding foreign warships could be driven from Soviet waters by several means, including bumping.

== Incident ==
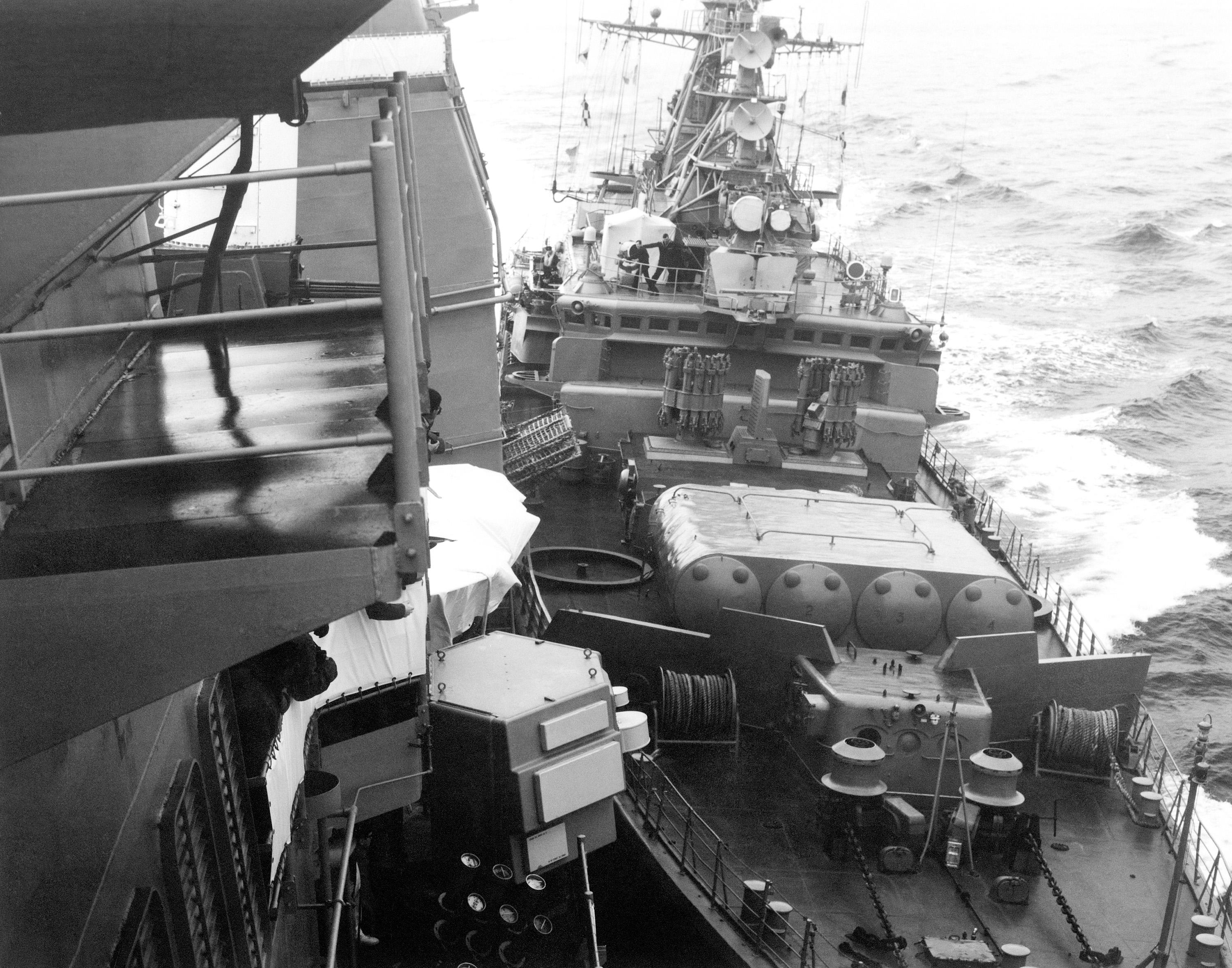
Soviet frigate Bezzavetny (right) bumping USS Yorktown

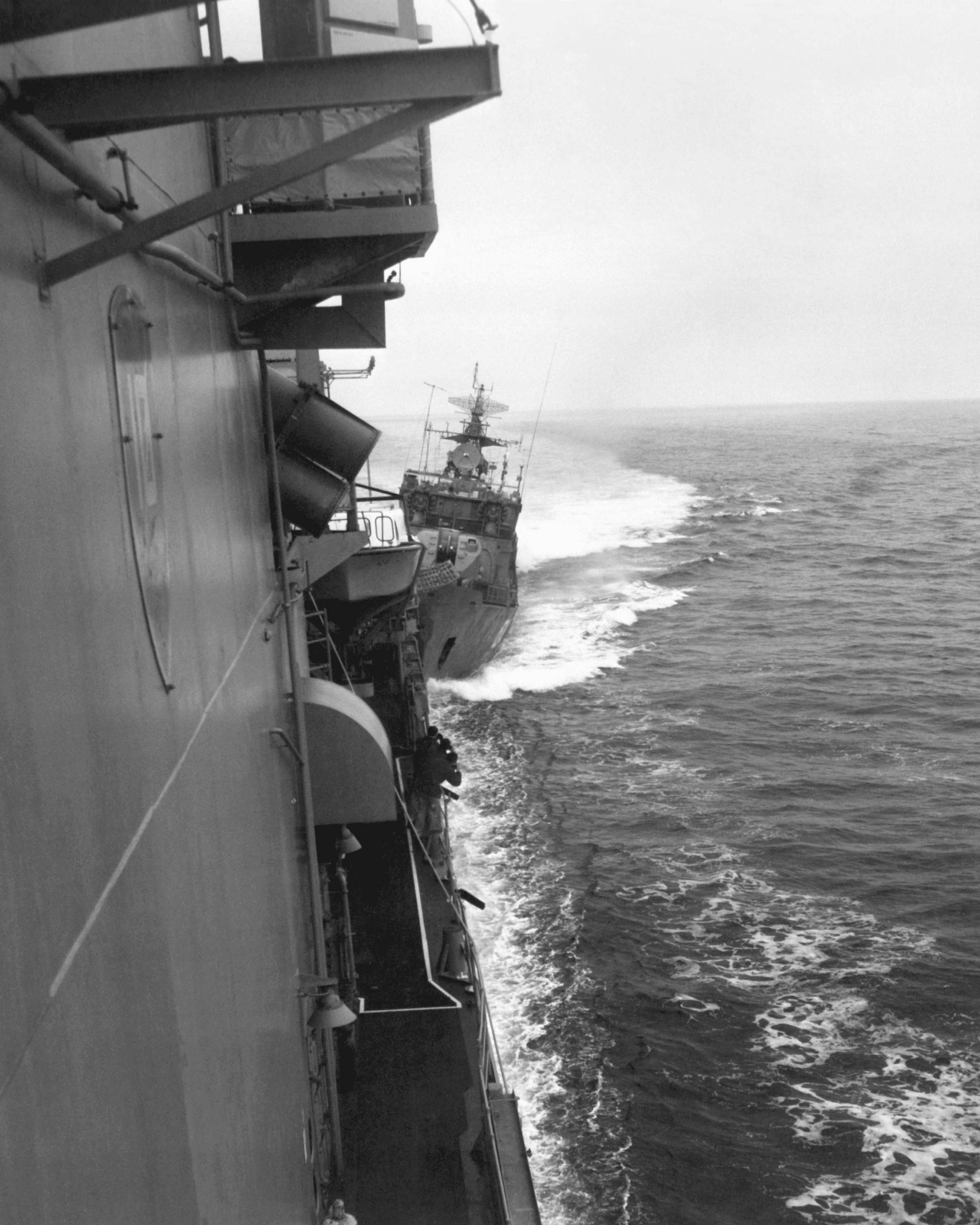
Soviet frigate SKR-6 bumping USS Caron

1988 Black Sea bumping incident (Black Sea)

On 12 February 1988, the Ticonderoga-class cruiser USS Yorktown, and the Spruance-class destroyer USS Caron, conducted an innocent passage exercise in the Black Sea. Caron passed 7.5 mi (12.1 km) off the Soviet shore, and Yorktown drew to 10.3 mi (16.6 km) offshore. The commander of the Black Sea Fleet Mikhail Khronopulo received an order from Chernavin to curb the passage of US warships. Initially the destroyer Krasnyy Kavkaz was tasked with confronting them, but she experienced technical problems so Bezzavetnyy, a Krivak-class frigate, was dispatched instead. However, according to Bezzavetny's commander, Captain Vladimir Bogdashin, his ship had two cruise missiles instead of four, was half the size of Yorktown, and was only a third its size by displacement. The Soviet frigate SKR-6, commanded by Captain Anatoliy Petrov, was approximately one quarter the size of USS Caron.

First, Caron was approached by the frigate SKR-6, and three minutes later, Yorktown was approached by the frigate Bezzavetnyy, while Tupolev Tu-16 bombers monitored the vessels' movements. As the US warships clipped a corner of the Soviet territorial waters, they were bumped. At 10:02 a.m, local time, at 44°15.2′N 33°35.4′E, 10.5 nautical miles (19.4 km; 12.1 mi) from the coast, SKR-6 bumped the port side aft of Caron at frame about 60 feet (18 m) from the bow. Caron received superficial scraping of paint, with no personnel injuries. Bezzavetnyy, having bumped Yorktown, returned to base.

Both US warships stayed on even course after the incident. Caron left Soviet territorial waters at 11:50 a.m. local time without further incident.

Both US warships reported the incident to the commander-in-chief of United States Naval Forces Europe, Admiral James B. Busey. Caron reported that, at 13:20 local time, it was informed on channel 16 VHF by Bezzavetnyy: "Soviet ships have orders to prevent violation of territorial waters, extreme measure is to strike your ship with one of ours." The reply of Caron was "I am engaged in innocent passage consistent with international law." Yorktown, in its report stated that on 9:56, local time, it was contacted by Bezzavetnyy via channel 16 and told to leave Soviet territorial waters or "our ship is going to strike on yours." Then, according to the report, Bezzavetnyy came alongside port side of Yorktown at 10:03 and bumped it by turning into the ship.

The starboard anchor of Bezzavetnyy was torn away. Two Harpoon missile canisters on Yorktown sustained damage when Bezzavetnyy's bullnose passed down port quarter. Bezzavetnyy then cleared to port and took station 300 yd (270 m) off the port beam of Yorktown. Bezzavetnyy required a minor repair.

== Response ==
The Soviet Ministry of Defense issued a statement blaming the U.S. warships for ignoring the "warning signals of Soviet border guard ships" and for "dangerously maneuvering in Soviet waters". The incident also drew a diplomatic protest from the U.S. government.

Soon after the issue of innocent passage was resolved between the two nations when the US/USSR Joint Statement on Uniform Acceptance of Rules of International Law Governing Innocent Passage was issued acknowledging the rights of each nation to transit territorial waters.

== See also ==
- 1986 Black Sea incident
- 2003 Tuzla Island conflict
- 2018 Kerch Strait incident
- 2021 Black Sea incident

== Bibliography ==
- Kraska, James; Pedrozo, Raul (2013). International Maritime Security Law. Martinus Nijhoff Publishers. ISBN 978-9004233577.
