= US/USSR Joint Statement on Uniform Acceptance of Rules of International Law Governing Innocent Passage =

1989 statement of common understanding

In 1989 the USA and USSR issued a Joint Statement on Uniform Acceptance of Rules of International Law Governing Innocent Passage. It made it clear that the text of the 1982 United Nations Convention on the Law of the Sea (UNCLOS) reflected customary international law, and every ship, regardless of cargo, does not need permission to enter another state's territorial sea so long as it adheres to the definition of innocent passage in Article 19 of UNCLOS.

During the Cold War the United States had maintained the right of the US Navy to transit the territorial waters of other states including the USSR. They would send regular patrols into contested waters to assert this right. This led to frequent tensions such as the 1988 Black Sea bumping incident where Soviet ships intentionally pushed into American warships in Soviet Black Sea waters.

The next year the Joint Statement was issued acknowledging all nation's rights to peacefully transit the territorial waters of another and ending such disputes between the two superpowers. However, the same position is not maintained by the government of China. China demands that foreign warships request permission before entering its waters, including the contested South China Sea. The United States maintains its rights to cross those waters and regularly sends naval vessels through them to enforce that claim.
