= 1986 Black Sea incident =

American ships' use of innocent passage

- Date: March 13, 1986
- Location: Black Sea; 44°13.5′N 34°09.3′E
- Type: Deliberate naval collision
- Target: United States Navy vessels: USS Yorktown; USS Caron
- Perpetrators: Soviet Navy vessels: Ladny; Border guard vessels Dozorny and Izmail

On March 13, 1986, the American cruiser USS Yorktown and the destroyer USS Caron exercised the right of innocent passage under international law through Soviet territorial waters in the Black Sea near the southern Crimean Peninsula. They were confronted by Soviet frigate Ladny and border guard vessels Dozorny and Izmail.

Yorktown and Caron stayed in Soviet territorial waters for roughly two hours. The situation de-escalated when the US ships left; diplomatic repercussions continued for several weeks.

== Background ==
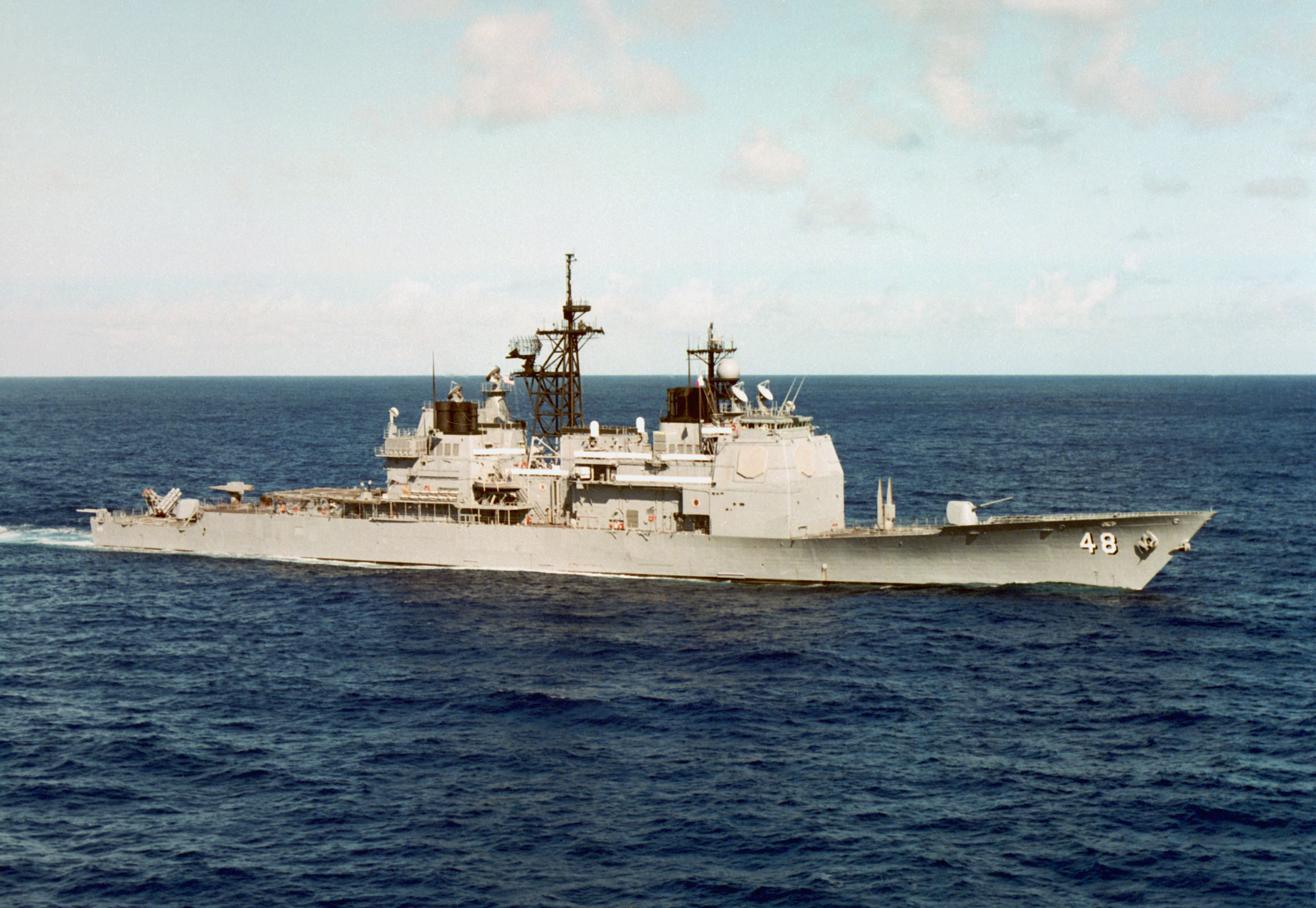
USS Yorktown

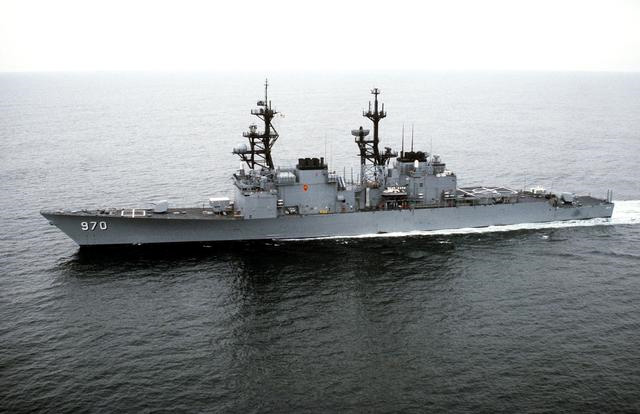
USS Caron

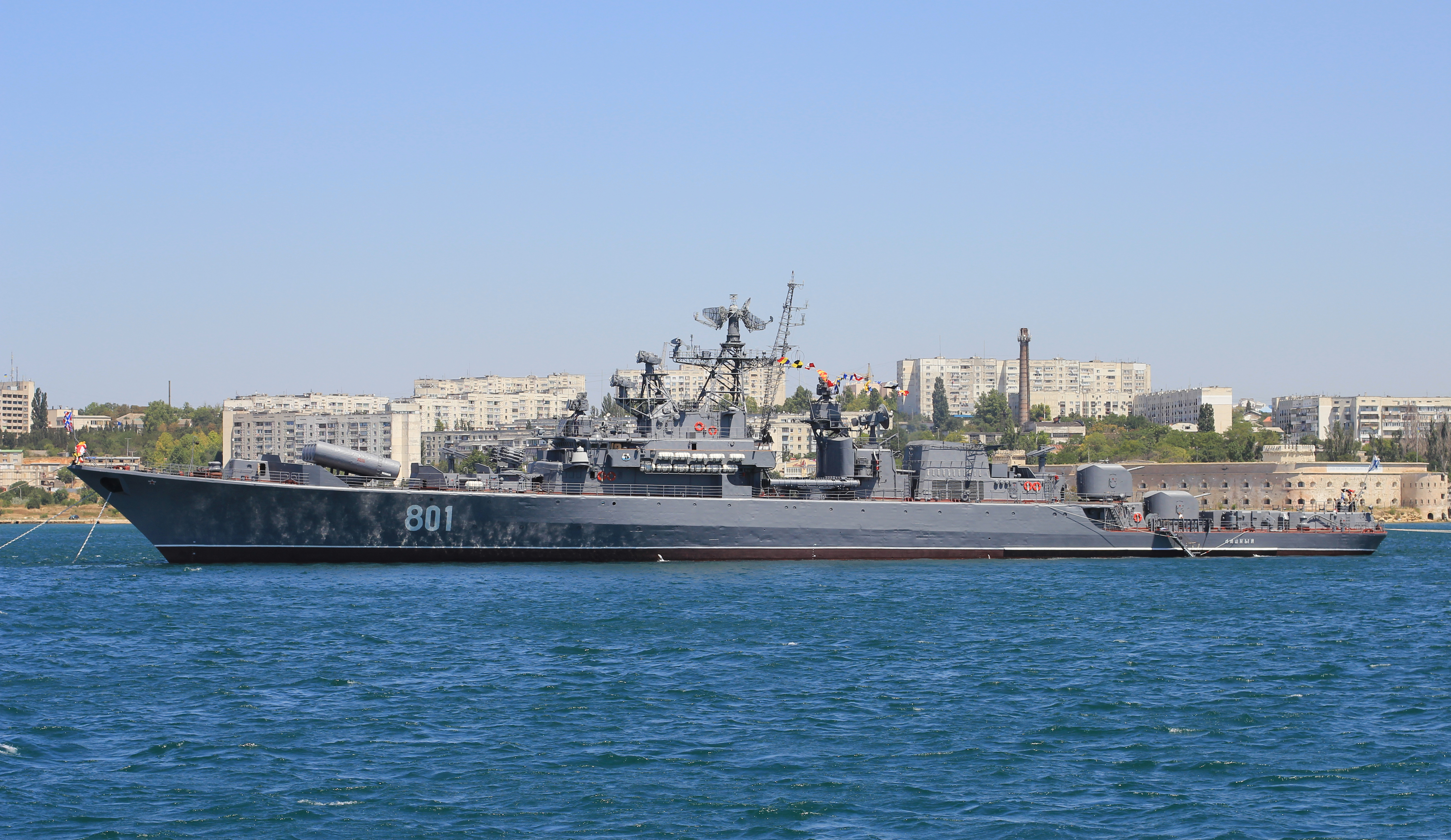
Ladny

"The Rules of Navigation and Sojourn of Foreign Warships in the Territorial Waters and Internal Waters and Ports of the USSR", enacted by the Soviet Council of Ministers in 1983, acknowledged the right of innocent passage of foreign warships only in restricted areas of Soviet territorial waters in the Baltic, Sea of Okhotsk and the Sea of Japan. There were no sea lanes for innocent passage in the Black Sea. The United States, starting from 1979, conducted a freedom of navigation program as the US government believed that many countries were beginning to assert jurisdictional boundaries that far exceeded traditional claims. The program was implemented because diplomatic protests seemed ineffective. The US actions in the Black Sea were challenged by the Soviet Union several times prior to the 1986 incident, particularly on December 9, 1968, August 1979 and on February 18, 1984.

At the time, the Soviet Union recognized the right of innocent passage for warships in its territorial waters solely in designated sea lanes. The United States believed that there was no legal basis for a coastal nation to limit warship transits to sea lanes only. Subsequently, the U.S. Department of State found that the Russian-language text of the United Nations Convention on the Law of the Sea, Article 22, paragraph 1 allowed the coastal state to regulate the right of innocent passage whenever necessary, while the English-language text did not.

== Incident ==
Black Sea (Black Sea)

On March 10, 1986, the Ticonderoga-class cruiser USS Yorktown, accompanied by the Spruance-class destroyer USS Caron, entered the Black Sea via the Turkish Straits. Their entrance was observed by a Krivak-class frigate, Ladny, which was ordered to continue observation. On March 13, Yorktown and Caron entered the Soviet territorial waters and sailed west along the southern Crimean Peninsula, approaching within 6 nautical miles (11 km) of the coast. Having entered from the direction of Feodosia, the US warships sailed for two hours and 21 minutes. Both American warships also confronted the Soviet border guard vessels Dozorny and Izmail. The commander of Ladny, Captain Zhuravlev, reported the incident to his superiors.

The Russian state-run Izvestiya editor Vyacheslav Lukashin claimed that "at the time of the incident the Commander-in-Chief of the Soviet Navy Vladimir Chernavin knew that the order for the U.S. warships to proceed into Soviet waters was given by the U.S. Secretary of Defense Caspar Weinberger with the consent of President Ronald Reagan."

== Aftermath ==
=== Soviet protest ===
The Soviet Ministry of Foreign Affairs held two press conferences concerning the incident. The US charge d'affaires, Richard Combs, was summoned to the Soviet Ministry of Foreign Affairs to receive the Soviet protest. The Soviet Union stated that the US "violation" of its territorial waters "was of a demonstrative, defiant nature and pursued clearly provocative aims". Vladimir Chernavin claimed that "the innocent passage of foreign warships through the territorial waters of the USSR is permitted only in specially authorized coastal areas which have been announced by the Soviet government [and] there are no such areas in the Black Sea off the coast of the Soviet Union".

=== US stance ===
Replying to the Soviet note verbale about the incident, the US stated that "the transit of the USS Yorktown and USS Caron through the claimed Soviet territorial sea on March 13, 1986, was a proper exercise of the right of innocent passage, which international law, both customary and conventional, has long accorded ships of all states". The U.S. Department of State's instructions to the American embassy in the Soviet Union noted the US "would not want to lend any validity to a Soviet position that their domestic law was at all relevant in determining U.S. navigational rights under international law". An article in the American Journal of International Law argued in 1987 that "the course of the American warships indicated on a map published in Izvestiia confirms that the passage of the vessels was a lateral one" and that "at no time did they take a course that could be construed as expressing an intention to enter the internal waters or ports of the USSR".

In the subsequent incident of 1988, the same USS Yorktown and USS Caron, while claiming innocent passage again in the Black Sea, were bumped by the Soviet vessels.

== See also ==
- 1988 Black Sea bumping incident
- 2003 Tuzla Island conflict
- 2018 Kerch Strait incident
- 2021 Black Sea incident
