= Ukrainian frigate Dnipropetrovsk =

1977 Krivak-class frigate

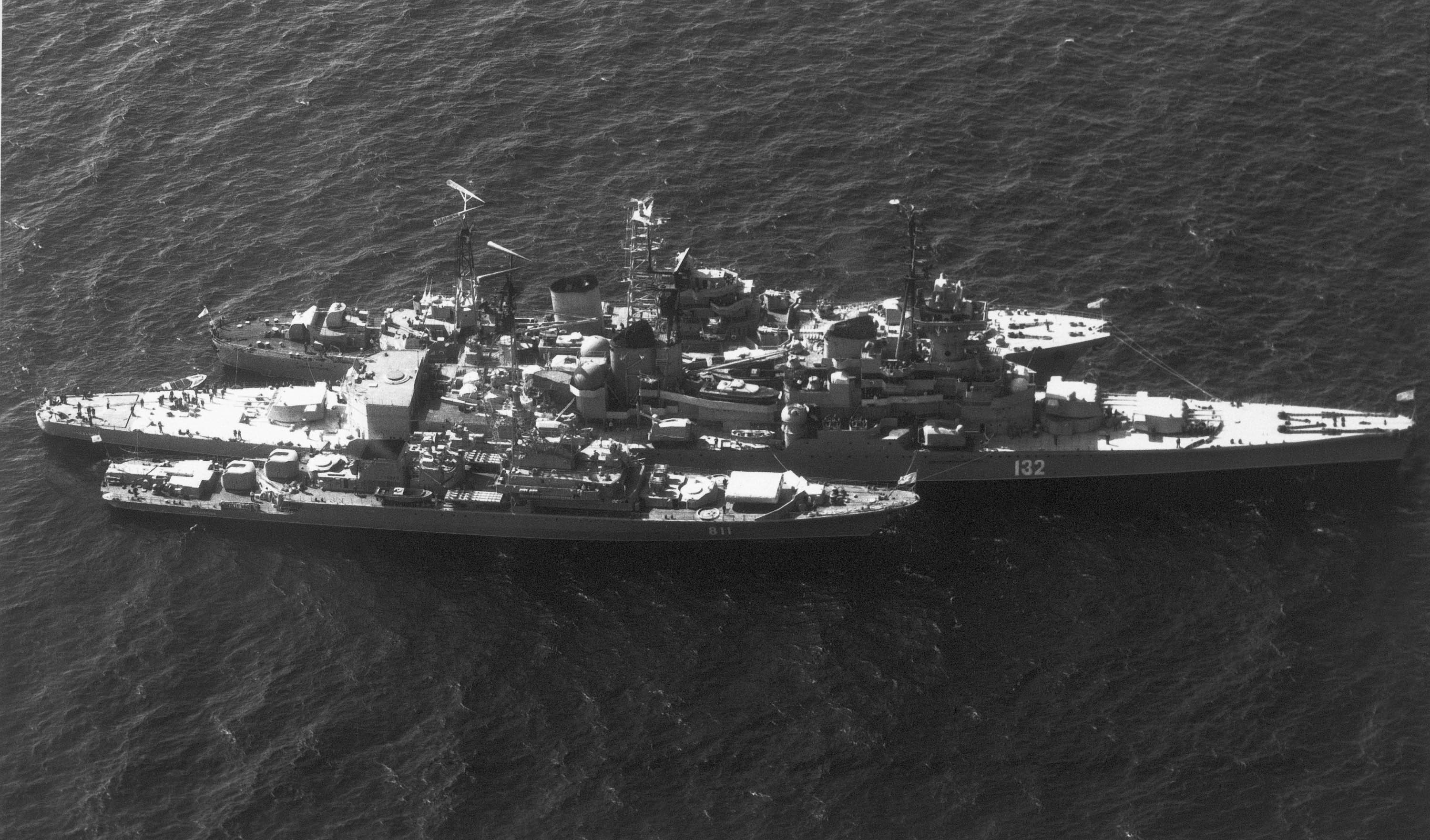
- Bezzavetnyy is closest to the camera, the cruiser Zhdanov in the middle and the submarine tender Magomed Gadzhiev in the rear

History

→ Soviet Union → Russia
- Name: Bezzavetnyy
- Ordered: 4 July 1973
- Builder: Zaliv Shipbuilding yard (Kerch)
- Yard number: 14
- Launched: 7 May 1977
- Commissioned: 17 February 1978
- Decommissioned: 8 September 1997
- Fate: Transferred to Ukraine on 1 August 1997

Ukraine
- Name: Dnipropetrovsk
- Acquired: 1 August 1997
- Decommissioned: October 2002
- Renamed: 1997
- Reclassified: "Technical property" (2002)
- Identification: U134
- Fate: Scuttled on 12 May 2005

General characteristics
- Class & type: Burevestnik-class frigate
- Displacement: 3,300 tons standard, 3,575 tons full load
- Length: 405.3 ft (123.5 m)
- Beam: 46.3 ft (14.1 m)
- Draft: 15.1 ft (4.6 m)
- Propulsion: 2 shaft; COGAG; 2 x M-8k gas-turbines, 40,000 shp (30,000 kW); 2 x M-62 gas-turbines (cruise), 14,950 shp (11,150 kW)
- Speed: 32 knots (59 km/h; 37 mph)
- Range: 4,995 nmi (9,251 km; 5,748 mi) at 14 knots (26 km/h; 16 mph)
- Complement: 200
- Sensors & processing systems: Radar: 1 MR-755 Fregat-M/Half Plate air/surface search; Sonar: Zvezda-2 suite with MGK-345 Bronza/Ox Yoke bow mounted LF, Ox Tail LF VDS; Fire Control: Purga ASW combat system, 2 Drakon/Eye Bowl SSM targeting, 2 MPZ-301 Baza/Pop Group
- Electronic warfare & decoys: Start suite with Bell Shroud intercept, Bell Squat jammer, 4 PK-16 decoy RL, 8 PK-10 decoy RL, 2 towed decoys
- Armament: 1 × 4 URK-5 (SS-N-14 'Silex') SSM/ASW missiles; 2 × Osa-MA (SA-N-4'Gecko') SAM (40 missiles); 4 × 76 mm guns (2×2); 2 × quad 533 mm torpedo tubes

The Ukrainian frigate Dnipropetrovsk was the former Soviet frigate (guard ship) Bezzavetnyy of the Burevestnik-class (NATO codename: Krivak I) built for the Soviet Navy in the late 1970s.

== Service history ==
=== Black Sea incident ===
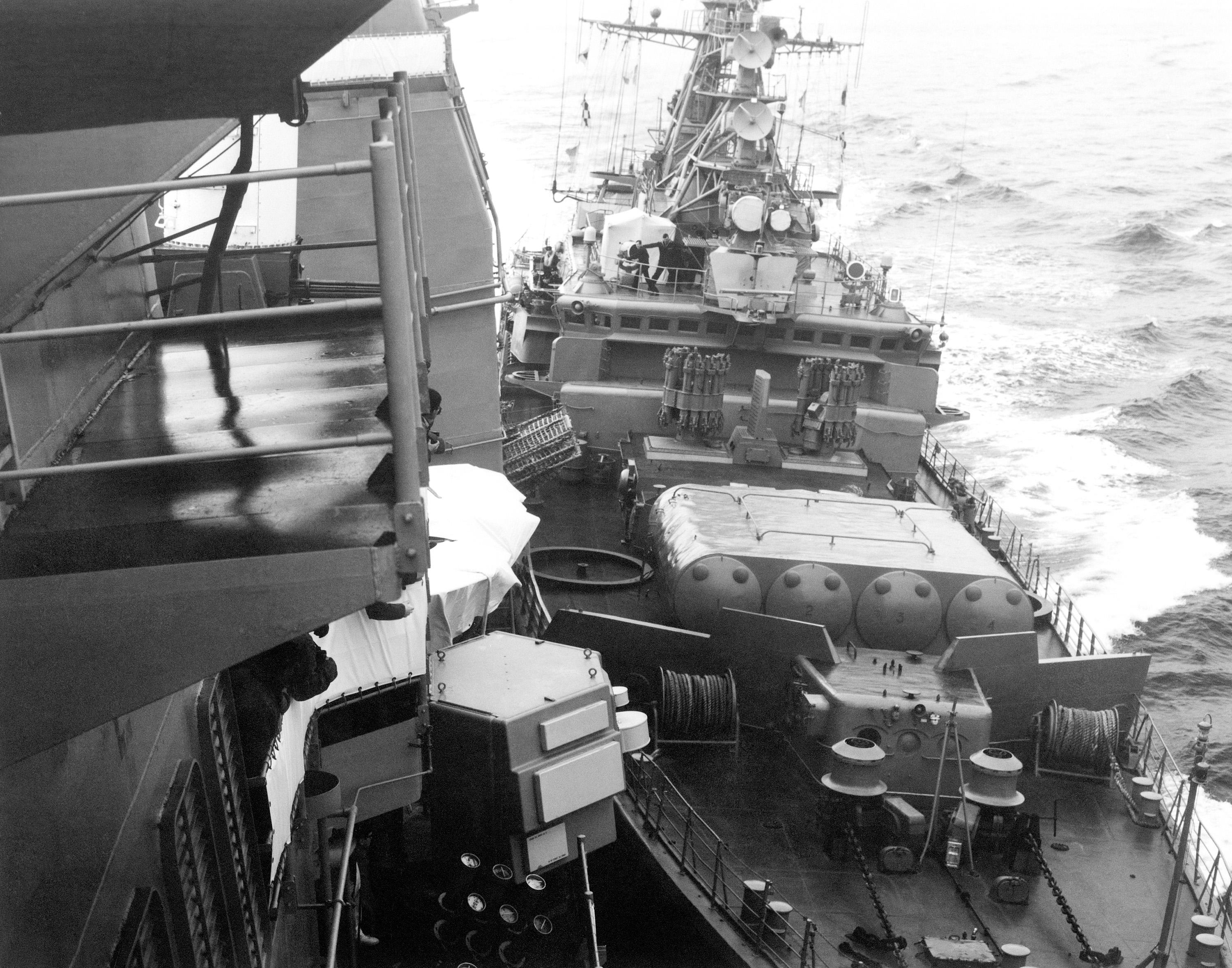
Bezzavetnyy shown colliding with USS Yorktown

On 12 February 1988, under the command of Captain 2nd Rank Vladimir Bogdashin, the ship intentionally nudged the U.S. missile cruiser USS Yorktown in Soviet territorial waters while Yorktown was claiming innocent passage.

=== Ukrainian service ===
In summer of 1997 during the division of the Black Sea fleet she was transferred to the Ukrainian Navy, receiving the name of Dnipropetrovsk.

=== Fate ===
Dnipropetrovsk was decommissioned in 2002 and was scuttled in the Black Sea in the spring of 2005.

== See also ==
- Ukrainian frigate Mykolaiv
