= USS Yorktown (CG-48) =

Ticonderoga-class cruiser

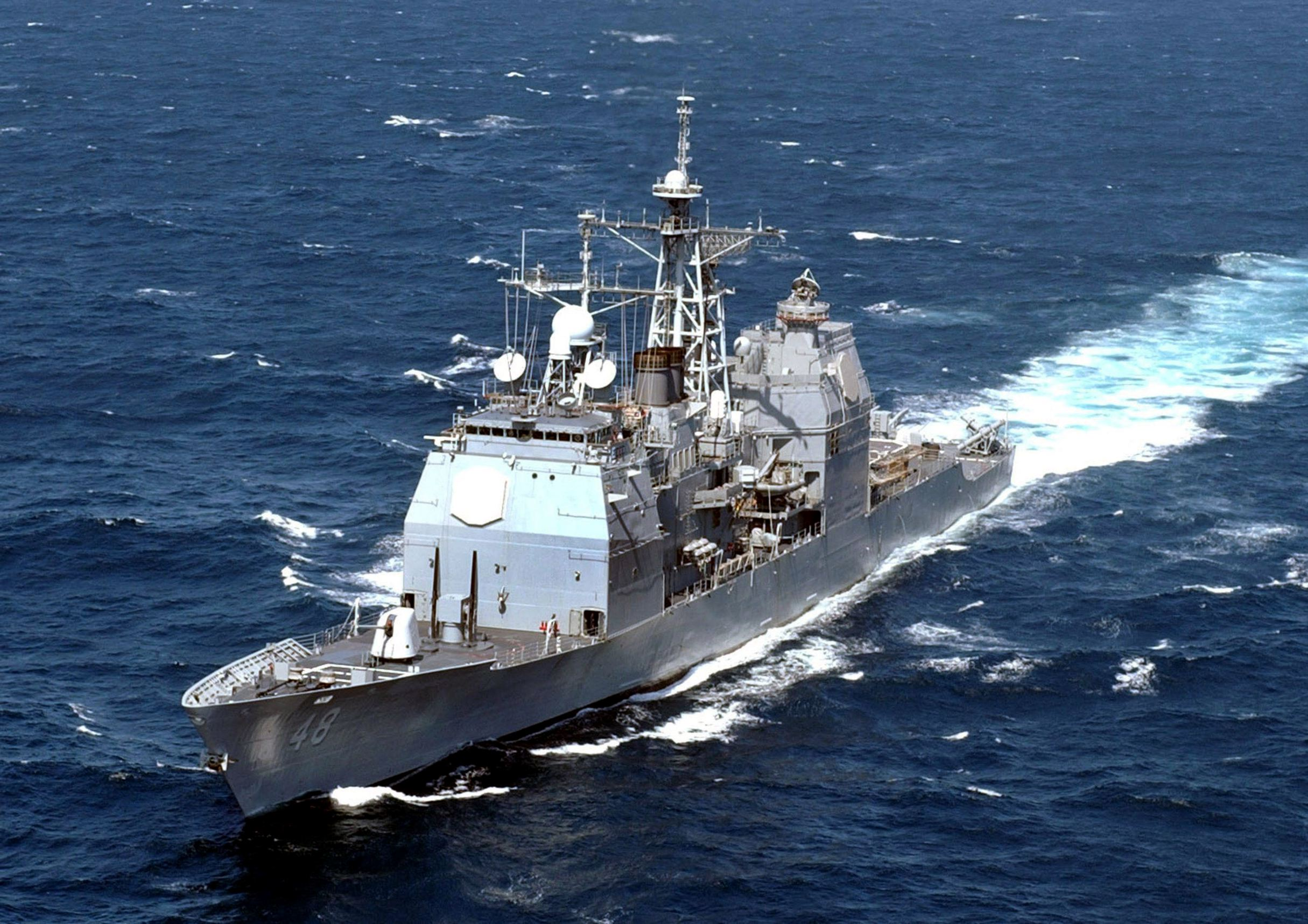
- USS Yorktown on 24 February 2002

History

United States
- Name: Yorktown
- Namesake: Battle of Yorktown
- Ordered: 28 April 1980
- Builder: Ingalls Shipbuilding
- Laid down: 19 October 1981
- Launched: 17 January 1983
- Sponsored by: Mrs. Mary Mathews
- Commissioned: 4 July 1984
- Decommissioned: 10 December 2004
- Stricken: 10 December 2004
- Identification: Call sign: NYKN; Hull number: CG-48
- Motto: Victory is our tradition
- Fate: Scrapped
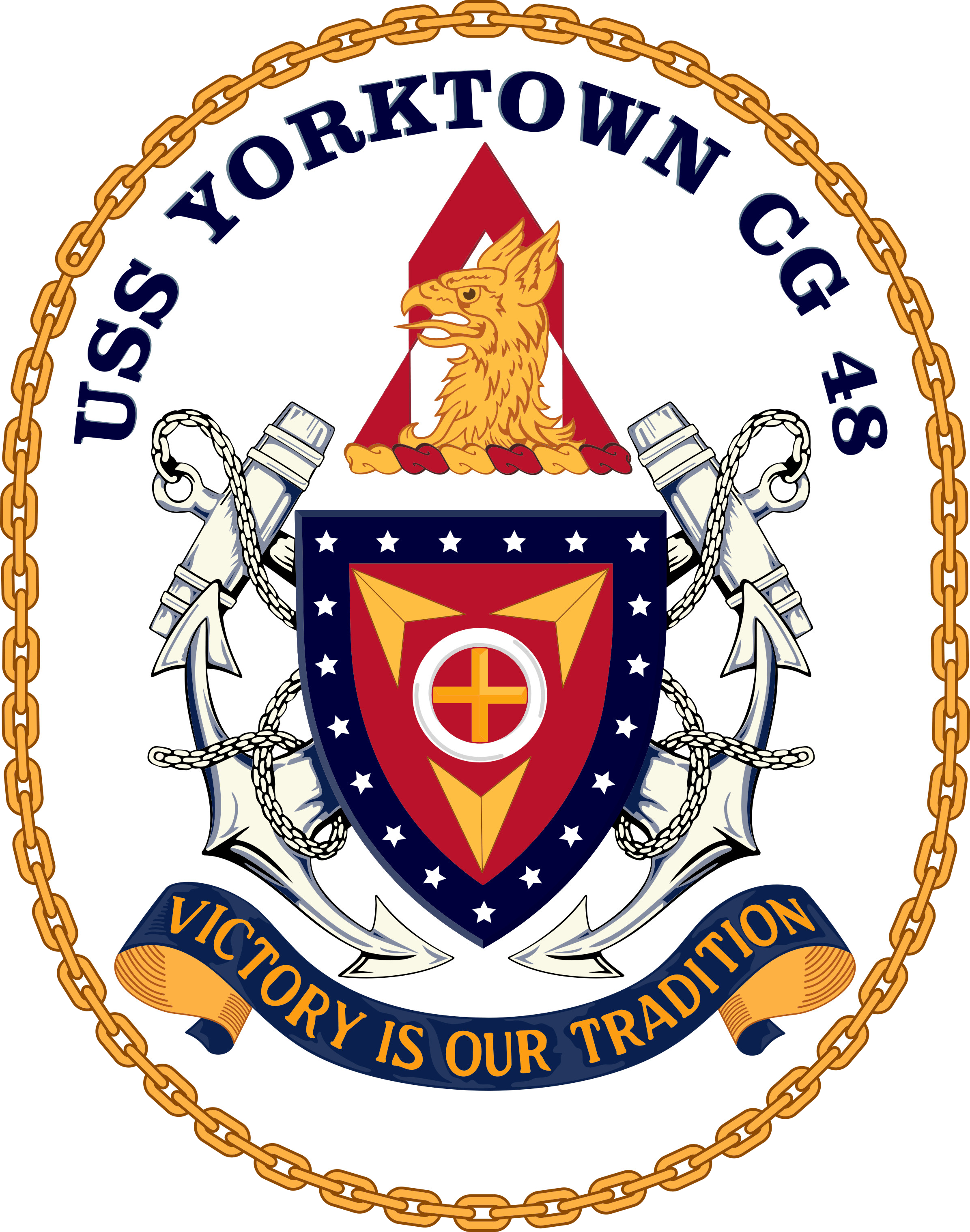
- Badge

General characteristics
- Class & type: Ticonderoga-class cruiser
- Displacement: Approx. 9,600 long tons (9,800 t) full load
- Length: 567 feet (173 m)
- Beam: 55 feet (16.8 meters)
- Draft: 34 feet (10.2 meters)
- Propulsion: 4 × General Electric LM2500 gas turbine engines; 2 × controllable-reversible pitch propellers; 2 × rudders
- Speed: 32.5 knots (60 km/h; 37.4 mph)
- Complement: 30 officers and 300 enlisted
- Sensors & processing systems: AN/SPY-1A/B multi-function radar; AN/SPS-49 air search radar (Removed on some ships); AN/SPG-62 fire control radar; AN/SPS-73 surface search radar; AN/SPQ-9 gun fire control radar; AN/SQQ-89(V)1/3 - A(V)15 Sonar suite, consisting of: AN/SQS-53B/C/D active sonar; AN/SQR-19 TACTAS, AN/SQR-19B ITASS, & MFTA passive sonar; AN/SQQ-28 light airborne multi-purpose system
- Armament: 2 × Mk 26 missile launchers; 68 × RIM-66 SM-2; 20 × RUR-5 ASROC; 8 × RGM-84 Harpoon missiles; 2 × 5 in (127 mm)/54 caliber Mark 45 lightweight gun; 2–4 × .50 in (12.7 mm) cal. machine gun; 2 × Phalanx CIWS; 2 × Mk 32 12.75 in (324 mm) triple torpedo tubes
- Aircraft carried: 2 × MH-60R Seahawk LAMPS Mk III helicopters.

USS Yorktown (DDG-48/CG-48) was a Ticonderoga-class cruiser in the United States Navy from 1984 to 2004, named for the American Revolutionary War Battle of Yorktown.

== History ==
Yorktown was launched 17 January 1983 and was sponsored by Mrs. Mary Matthews, widow of Nick Matthews, a prominent citizen of Yorktown, Virginia. Yorktown was commissioned on 4 July 1984 at Yorktown, Virginia, and was designed to take advantage of the American Aegis technology. Among her various weapon systems were surface to air missiles (SAMs), anti-ship/anti-submarine missiles, torpedo launchers, and a mounted cannon. Yorktown's first deployment was from August 1985 to April 1986 and, among other things, involved the Achille Lauro hijacker intercept, two Black Sea excursions (in 1986 and 1988), and a trio of operations off the Libyan coast including Operation El Dorado Canyon and Operation Attain Document and Prairie Fire.

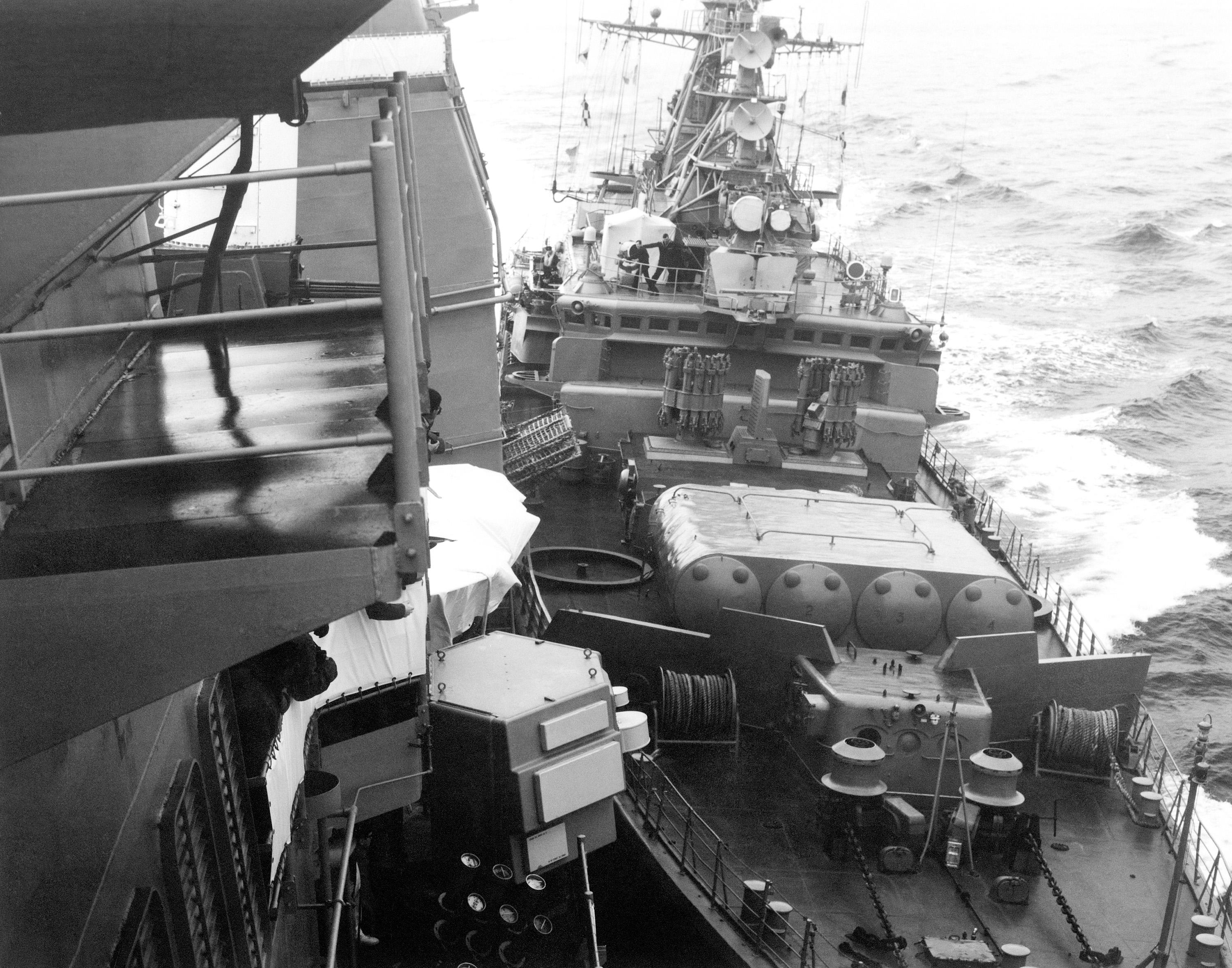
The Soviet Burevestnik M-class frigate Bezzavetnyy intentionally hit Yorktown in 1988.

Yorktown received the Atlantic Fleet's "Top Gun" award for outstanding naval gunfire support in 1987. During the second deployment from September 1987 to March 1988, Yorktown participated in numerous U.S. and NATO exercises, as well as multi-national exercises with Morocco, France, West Germany, Tunisia, and Turkey. It was on this Mediterranean deployment that Yorktown gained worldwide publicity from operations conducted in the Black Sea as part of Freedom of Navigation program. On 12 February 1988, while Yorktown was exercising the "right of innocent passage" through Soviet territorial waters, the Soviet Burevestnik-class frigate Bezzavetnyy (Russian: Беззаветный) intentionally collided with Yorktown with the intention of pushing her out of Soviet territorial waters. The Assistant Secretary of Defense for International Security Affairs at the time, Richard L. Armitage, acknowledged that the transit was not operationally necessary, but asserted that it was still a valid innocent passage under international law.

In 1991, Yorktown was awarded the coveted "Old Crow's" award for electronic warfare excellence. In 1992 Yorktown was honored with the Marjorie Sterrett Battleship Fund Award for superb, sustained combat readiness.

Yorktown conducted her third and fourth Mediterranean deployments as the world watched the end of the Cold War and the coalition victory in Operation Desert Storm. During the latter of these two deployments Yorktown participated in the first U.S. military exercises with the Romanian and Bulgarian navies, and played a key role in Operation Provide Comfort, which provided humanitarian relief and security for the Kurdish refugees in northern Iraq. In the summer of 1992, Yorktown participated in BALTOPS '92. During this cruise, Yorktown made a highly acclaimed port visit to Severomorsk, Russia, becoming the first U.S. ship to visit that port since the end of World War II.

In 1993, Yorktown was awarded the Commander, Naval Surface Forces, Atlantic Ship Safety Award for a superior safety record. Yorktown has also been awarded two Navy Unit Commendations and a Meritorious Unit Commendation, and is a four-time winner of the coveted Battle Efficiency "E".

Yorktown served as Flagship for Commander, Task Group 4.1, during counter-drug operations in the Caribbean in May–July 1993. In August 1993, Yorktown participated in the joint military exercise Solid Stance in the North Atlantic. Yorktown's operations through the end of 1993 included an October–November excursion to the Caribbean to support the United Nations embargo of Haiti. In April–May 1994, Yorktown returned to the Caribbean as Force Air Warfare Commander during joint Exercise Agile Provider. While in the Caribbean, Yorktown served as flagship for Commander, Destroyer Squadron Six, coordinating a six-ship, twenty-six missile exercise. In the summer of 1994, Yorktown achieved a resounding score of 101 during naval gunfire support qualification.

In August 1994 Yorktown set sail for the Adriatic Sea as flagship for Commander, Standing Naval Force Atlantic, in support of the United Nations embargo of the Federal Republic of Yugoslavia. During this six-month deployment, Yorktown served as the Air Warfare Commander for the Adriatic Sea, participating in a joint task force of ships from the United States and eight European nations. In May–June 1995, Yorktown proceeded south to serve as Air Warfare Commander for the Caribbean Sea in support of counter-narcotics operations.

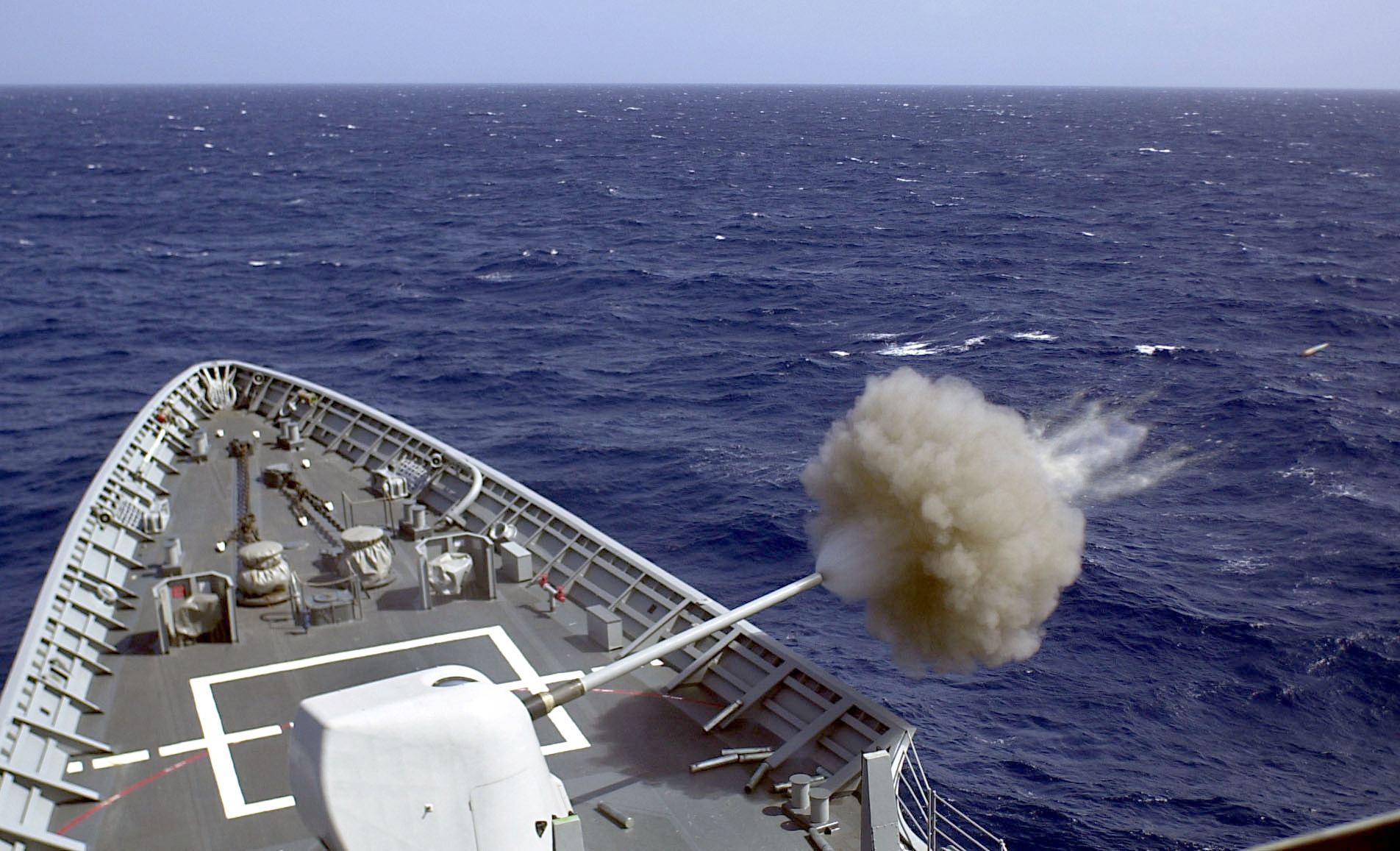
Yorktown firing at a target drone during a gun exercise

In May 1997 Yorktown (with a reduced crew aboard) completed a five-month counter-narcotic deployment in the Caribbean followed by tests with George Washington and her accompanying Cruiser-Destroyer Group 2. During these periods Navy Manpower and Analysis Center (NAVMAC) conducted a detailed review of manpower requirements, and the Operational Test and Evaluation Force verified the ship's ability to meet all required operational capabilities in the projected operating environment doctrine for Ticonderoga-class cruisers.

On 21 September 1997, a division by zero error on board the Yorktown Remote Data Base Manager brought down all the machines on the network, causing the ship's propulsion system to fail.

On 25 September 1999 Yorktown departed Pascagoula for a four-month counter-narcotic deployment in the Caribbean. Before beginning patrolling efforts, Yorktown embarked staff members from Commander, Second Fleet. Supported by the helicopter detachment, the Second Fleet staff surveyed and photographed another island being considered as a potential replacement for training exercises if the Navy was unable to continue at Vieques Island, Puerto Rico. The ship made port calls in Jamaica, Aruba, Cartagena, Rodman, Manta and Cozumel. During this deployment, Yorktown was the last U.S. warship to transit the Panama Canal prior to it being turned over to Panama.

== Fate ==
Yorktown being removed from the basin at the Philadelphia NISMF on 16 September 2022.

Yorktown was decommissioned and struck from the Naval Vessel Register on 10 December 2004. After her decommissioning, Yorktown was berthed at the Naval Inactive Ship Maintenance Facility in Philadelphia, Pennsylvania.

On 16 September 2022, Yorktown was removed from the Philadelphia NIMSF and began her journey to Brownsville, Texas, for scrapping. She arrived in Brownsville on 29 November 2022, and was scrapped thereafter.

== Smart ship testbed ==
From 1996, Yorktown was used as the testbed for the Navy's Smart Ship program. The ship was equipped with a network of 27 dual 200 MHz Pentium Pro-based machines running Windows NT 4.0 communicating over fiber-optic cable with a Pentium Pro-based server. This network was responsible for running the integrated control center on the bridge, monitoring condition assessment, damage control, machinery control and fuel control, monitoring the engines and navigating the ship. This system was predicted to save $2.8 million per year by reducing the ship's complement by 10%.

On 21 September 1997, while on maneuvers off the coast of Cape Charles, Virginia, a crew member entered a zero into a database field causing an attempted division by zero in the ship's Remote Data Base Manager, resulting in a buffer overflow which brought down all the machines on the network, causing the ship's propulsion system to fail.

Anthony DiGiorgio, a civilian contractor with a 26-year history of working on Navy control systems, reported in 1998 that Yorktown had to be towed back to Norfolk Naval Station. Ron Redman, a deputy technical director with the Aegis Program Executive Office, backed up this claim, suggesting that such system failures had required Yorktown to be towed back to port several times.

In the 3 August 1998 issue of Government Computer News, a retraction by DiGiorgio was published. He claimed the reporter altered his statements, and insisted that he did not claim the Yorktown was towed into Norfolk. GCN stood by its story.

Atlantic Fleet officials also denied the towing, reporting that Yorktown was "dead in the water" for just 2 hours and 45 minutes. Captain Richard Rushton, commanding officer of Yorktown at the time of the incident, also denied that the ship had to be towed back to port, stating that the ship returned under its own power.

Atlantic Fleet officials acknowledged that the Yorktown experienced what they termed "an engineering local area network casualty". "We are putting equipment in the engine room that we cannot maintain and, when it fails, results in a critical failure," DiGiorgio said.

Criticism of operating system choice ensued. Ron Redman, deputy technical director of the Fleet Introduction Division of the Aegis Program Executive Office, said that there had been numerous software failures associated with NT aboard the Yorktown.

Because of politics, some things are being forced on us that without political pressure we might not do, like Windows NT. If it were up to me I probably would not have used Windows NT in this particular application ... Refining that is an ongoing process ... Unix is a better system for control of equipment and machinery, whereas NT is a better system for the transfer of information and data. NT has never been fully refined and there are times when we have had shutdowns that resulted from NT.

— Ron Redman

== Awards ==
- 3x Joint Meritorious Unit Awards – (02-30 Nov 1990, 05-16 Apr 1991, 1997)(1 for Operation Fiery Vigil)
- 4x Navy Unit Commendations
- 1x Meritorious Unit Commendations (as a unit of Mediterranean Carrier Battle Group 3-91)
- 7x Battle Efficiency (Navy E) Ribbons – (1985, 1987, 1993, 1994, 1997, 1999, 2002)
- 1x Navy Expeditionary Medal
- 2x National Defense Service Medal
- 1x Humanitarian Service Medal – (Sep-Oct 1998)(as element of Navy Construction Battalion Center Gulfport 20th Naval Construction Regiment)
- 1x Armed Forces Service Medal
- 2x Coast Guard Special Operations Service Ribbon – (1990, 2002)
- Sea Service Deployment Ribbon (multiple awards)
- Marjorie Sterrett Battleship Fund Award – (1992)
- James F. Chezek Memorial Gunnery Award – (1987)
- "Old Crow's" award for Electronic Warfare excellence – (1991)

== See also ==
- List of software bugs
- Naval Inactive Ship Maintenance Facility
