= Russian corvette Stoikiy =

Steregushchiy-class corvette of the Russian Navy

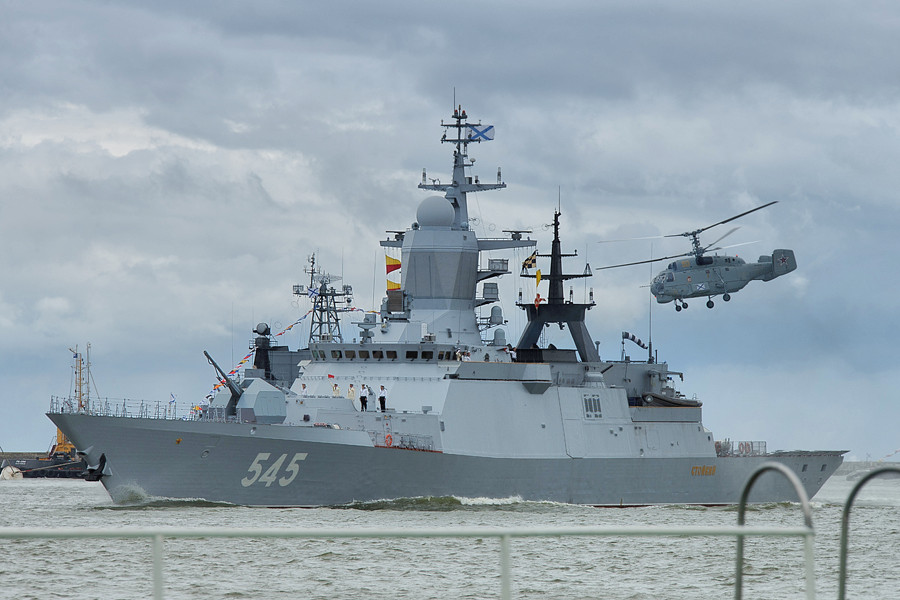
- Stoikiy on 26 July 2015

History

Russia
- Name: Stoikiy; (Стойкий)
- Namesake: Stoikiy
- Builder: Severnaya Verf, Saint Petersburg
- Laid down: 10 November 2006
- Launched: 30 May 2012
- Commissioned: 18 July 2014
- Home port: Baltiysk
- Identification: Pennant number: 545
- Status: Active

General characteristics
- Class & type: Steregushchiy-class corvette
- Displacement: Standard: 1,800 tons; Full: 2,200 tons
- Length: 104.5 m (343 ft)
- Beam: 13 m (43 ft); 11.6 m (38 ft) (waterline)
- Draught: 3.7 m (12 ft)
- Installed power: 380/220 V AC, 50 Hz, 4x630 kW diesel genset
- Propulsion: 2 shaft CODAD, 4 Kolomna 16D49 diesels 23,664 hp (17.6 MW)
- Speed: 27 kn (50 km/h; 31 mph)
- Range: 3,800 nmi (7,000 km; 4,400 mi) at 14 kn (26 km/h; 16 mph)
- Endurance: 15 days
- Complement: 90
- Sensors & processing systems: Air search radar: Furke 2 (Furke-E, Positiv-ME1, SMILE Thales for export); Surface search radar: Granit Central Scientific Institute Garpun-B/3Ts-25E/PLANK SHAVE radar; Monument targeting radar; Fire control radar: Ratep 5P-10E Puma for A-190; Sonar: Zarya-M (Zarya-ME for export) suite, bow mounted. Vinyetka low frequency active/passive towed array; Navigation: Gorizont-25 integrated navigation system
- Electronic warfare & decoys: EW Suite: TK-25E-5 ECM; Countermeasures: 4 x PK-10 decoy launchers
- Armament: 1 × 100 mm A-190 Arsenal or 130 mm A-192 naval gun; 1 × Kashtan CIWS-M (Project 20380); 2 × 4 Kh-35 (SS-N-25); 12 × Redut VLS cells (Project 20381); 2 × AK-630М CIWS; 2 × 4 330 mm torpedo tubes for Paket-NK (Paket-NK/E for export) anti-torpedo/anti-submarine torpedoes; 2 × 14.5 mm MTPU pedestal machine guns
- Aircraft carried: Hangar for Ka-27 helicopter; Launch pad for UAV Orlan-10

Stoikiy is a Steregushchiy-class corvette of the Russian Navy.

== Development and design ==
The Steregushchiy-class corvettes have a steel hull and composite material superstructure, with a bulbous bow and nine watertight subdivisions. They have a combined bridge and command centre, and space and weight provision for eight SS-N-25 missiles. Stealth technology was widely used during construction of the ships, as well as 21 patents and 14 new computer programs. Newest physical field reduction solutions were applied too. As a result, designers considerably reduced the ship's radar signature thanks to hull architecture and fire-resistant radar-absorbent fiberglass applied in the tophamper's design.

The Kashtan CIWS on the first ship was replaced in subsequent vessels by 12 Redut VLS cells containing 9M96E medium-range SAMs of the S-400 system. SS-N-27 (Kalibr type missiles) will be fitted to a larger domestic version, Project 20385.

The export version known as Project 20382 Tigr carries either eight supersonic SS-N-26 (P-800 Oniks) anti-ship missiles or sixteen subsonic SS-N-25 'Switchblade' (Kh-35E Uran). It also carries two twin-tube launchers for 533 mm heavy torpedoes. The A-190E 100 mm gun first used in the Talwar-class frigates is controlled by a 5P-10E system that can track four targets simultaneously. Protection from air attacks is provided by the Kashtan CIWS and eight mounts for the SA-N-10 'Grouse' (9K38 Igla) SAM.

== Construction and career ==
Stoikiy was laid down on 10 November 2006, and launched on 30 May 2012 by Severnaya Verf in Saint Petersburg. She was commissioned on 18 July 2014. On 21 January 2014, she completed the first stage of sea trial and on the 24th, arrived at the Naval Base Baltiysk. On the 29th, she conducted live fire exercises.

In April 2015, as part of a detachment of ships of the Baltic Fleet (Boikiy, Stoikiy, Soobrazitelny and Steregushchiy), together with naval aviation at a training ground in the Baltic Sea, she performed tasks in anti-aircraft and anti-submarine defense. During the exercise, the ships conducted artillery fire at sea and air targets, found and destroyed a simulated enemy submarine, and practiced joint maneuvering.

In November 2016, the crew of the Stoiky in the sea ranges of the Baltic Fleet worked out actions to search for and detect a simulated enemy submarine using the latest anti-submarine weapons and successfully conditionally hit a target from the Paket-E/NK anti-submarine system. Further, in November, acting together with the Soobrazitelny, during tactical exercises in the Baltic Sea, she delivered a successful missile strike against complex targets that imitated a ship (using the Uran anti-ship missile system) and a cruise missile (using the Redut air defense system).

On 15 June 2017, as part of a detachment of ships from the Baltic Fleet (Boikiy and Steregushchiy), she successfully completed elements of joint maneuvering at sea and artillery fire at sea surface targets. From 28 June to 2 July, she took part in the VIII International Naval Salon-2017 (IMDS -2017) held in St. Petersburg. On 30 July she took part in the main naval parade in Navy Day. On 31 August, during an exercise, the corvette crew repulsed a simulated torpedo attack in the Baltic Sea, and also conducted artillery firing at various targets, anti-sabotage defense measures, and an in-ship training to combat ship damage.

On 18 June 2018, a detachment of ships of the Baltic Fleet, consisting of Boikiy and Stoikiy, the tanker Kola and the tugboat Viktor Konetsky, sailed into the North Atlantic to carry out planned tasks for a long voyage.

On 15 November 2019, the Stoikiy and the large landing ship Kaliningrad returned to the homeport Baltiysk after completing combat training missions as part of the permanent presence of the Baltic Fleet forces in their area of responsibility, they were in the Baltic Sea for more than 30 days and traveled more than 4,000 miles.

=== 2021 ===
On 16 December 2020, corvette Stoikiy, tanker Kola and tug Yakov Grebelskiy left Naval Base Baltiysk for Atlantic, Mediterranean and Indian Ocean. In early January 2021, the ship detachment entered the Mediterranean Sea and on 9 January it called at Tartus, Syria. On 15 January, they met frigate Admiral Kasatonov and tug Nikolay Chiker in the western Mediterranean Sea. Later on, the three ships visited the Cypriot port of Limassol. On 1 February 2021, Stoikiy and Kola entered the Red Sea and were heading for the Gulf of Aden. Some reports suggested that the ships are to participate in the international naval exercise AMAN2021 in Pakistan, however the detachment of the three ships instead participated in an exercise with Iranian Navy between 15–16 February 2021. Iran contributed a frigate, a corvette, three missile boats, a patrol boat and two auxiliary vessels to the exercise. This was only the second deployment of the ships of this class beyond Suez Canal after Soobrazitelnyy's deployment to the Red Sea in November 2017. Between 20–23 February, Stoikiy called at Salalah, Oman. On 2 March, the ship escorted two merchant vessels in the Gulf of Aden. Between 12–15 March, Stoikiy, accompanied by Kola, paid a second visit to Salalah. On 19 March, Stoikiy and Kola called at Port Sudan, Sudan. This was the second visit of a Russian Navy vessel to the location of a future Russian naval base, following the port call of frigate Admiral Grigorovich on 28 February.

During the sandstorm with 40 kn winds in the Suez Canal on 23 March, Kola collided with the bulk carrier Ark Royal two hours prior to the container ship Ever Given running aground some 11 km further north, both ships sustaining slight damage. Stoikiy, along with Kola and around 350 other ships on both sides of the canal, were forced to wait for the Ever Given to be refloated. Stoikiy and Kola are the only military vessels known to have been affected by the obstruction. At the time of the incident, maritime tracking website Vesselfinder.com temporarily misidentified Kola as Stoikiy (specifically "Russian Warship 545"); this was corrected on 25 March. As of 29 March, Stoikiy was still anchored in the Gulf of Suez.

On 2 April, Stoiky called at Limassol, Cyprus.

=== 2022 ===
Stoikiy and Soobrazitelny entered the Mediterranean in October 2022 Between 18–21 October, they visited Algeria. In late November, both corvettes were absent from Tartus, likely shadowing French aircraft carrier, deployed to the East Mediterranean. On 5 December, they were in Tartus.

=== 2023 ===
In April 2023, the corvette, accompanied by Soobrazitelny and the frigate Admiral Grigorovich, was reported to have left the Mediterranean, transiting via the Atlantic to the Baltic. She was reported back in the Atlantic in June.

=== 2025/26 ===
The frigate was reported active as of late-2025/early-2026, transiting the English Channel destined for exercises with the Chinese, Iranian and South African navies and accompanied by the tanker Yel'nya. In February 2026, the corvette conducted joint exercises with the Iranian Navy and made a port call at Bandar Abbas. The ship departed Bandar Abbas prior to the outbreak of hostilities between the United States, Israel and Iran She then transitted the Suez Canal and in March/April 2026 was operating in the Mediterranean Sea, spending considerable time at the former Russian naval facility in Tartus, Syria with the suggestion that this facility was potentially being reactivated.

== Gallery ==
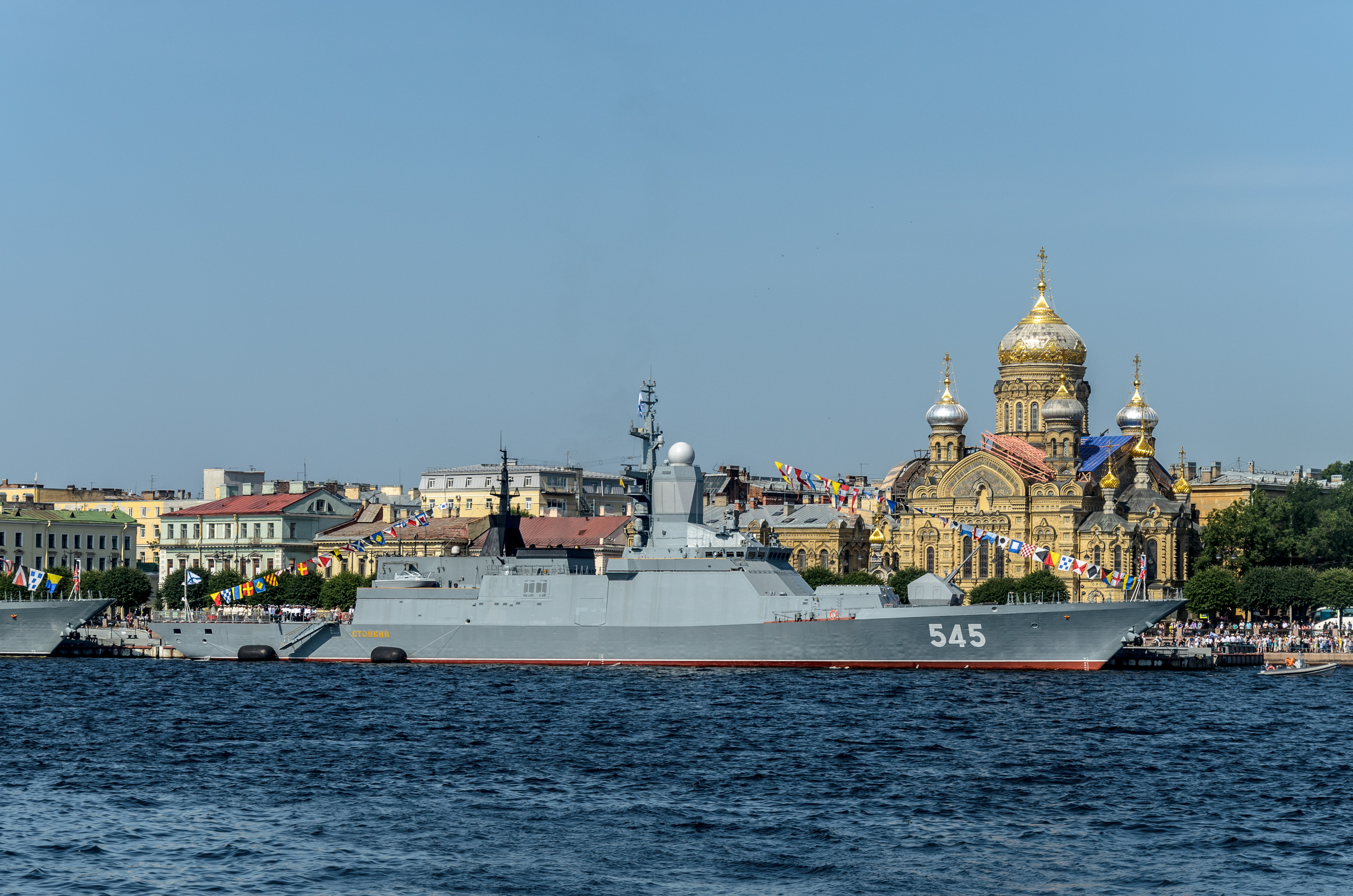
Stoikiy at Saint Petersburg on 27 July 2014.

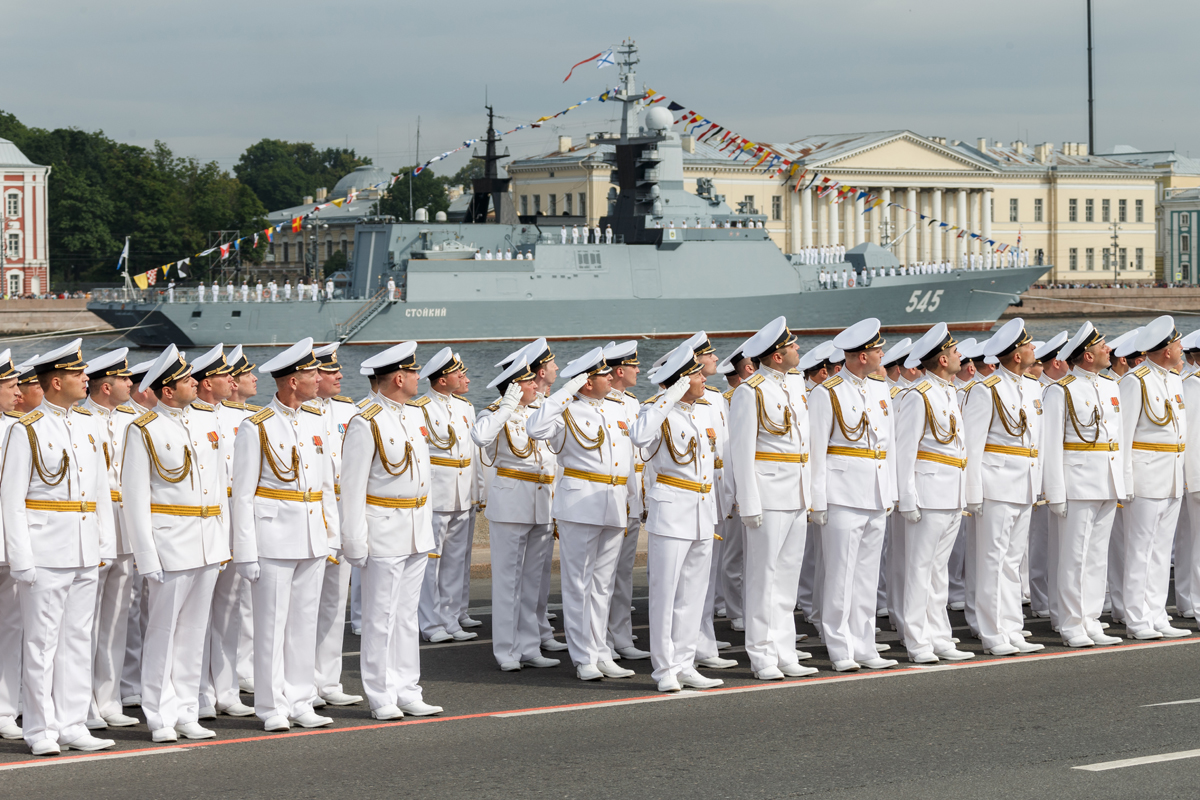
Stoikiy during Navy Day at Baltiysk on 30 July 2017.

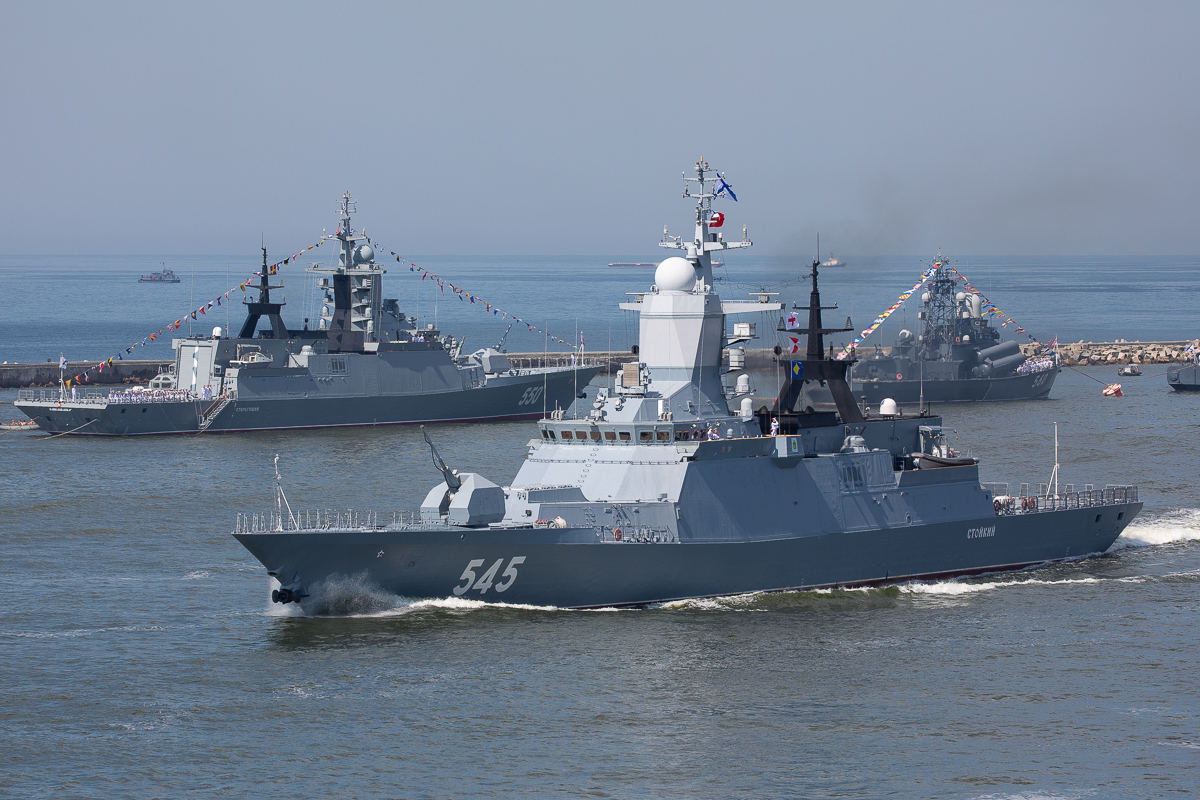
Stoikiy during Navy Day at Baltiysk on 30 July 2018.
