= Russian corvette Hero of the Russian Federation Aldar Tsydenzhapov =

Steregushchiy-class corvette of the Russian Navy

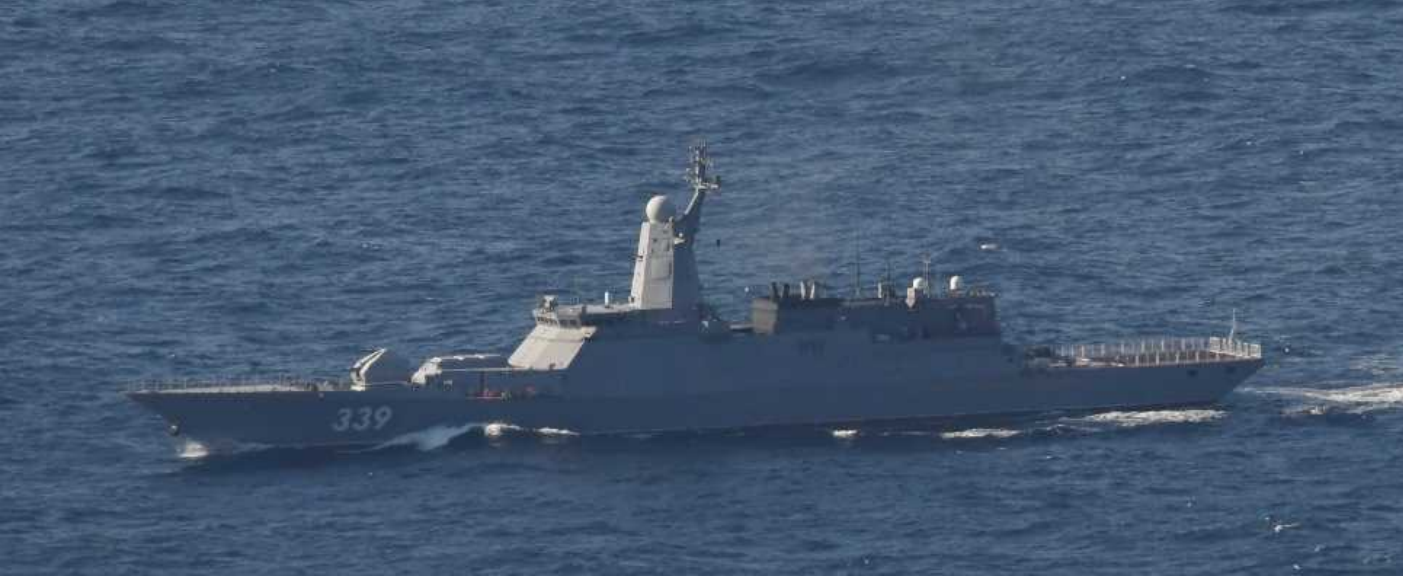
- Hero of the Russian Federation Aldar Tsydenzhapov on Oct 2021

History

Russia
- Name: Hero of the Russian Federation Aldar Tsydenzhapov; (Герой Российской Федерации Алдар Цыденжапов)
- Namesake: Aldar Tsydenzhapov
- Builder: Amur Shipyard, Komsomolsk-on-Amur
- Laid down: 22 July 2015
- Launched: 12 September 2019
- Commissioned: 25 December 2020
- Home port: Vladivostok
- Identification: Pennant number: 339
- Status: Active

General characteristics
- Class & type: Steregushchiy-class corvette
- Displacement: Standard: 1,800 tons; Full: 2,200 tons
- Length: 104.5 m (343 ft)
- Beam: 13 m (43 ft); 11.6 m (38 ft) (waterline)
- Draught: 3.7 m (12 ft)
- Installed power: 380/220 V AC, 50 Hz, 4x630 kW diesel genset
- Propulsion: 2 shaft CODAD, 4 Kolomna 16D49 diesels 23,664 hp (17.6 MW)
- Speed: 27 kn (50 km/h; 31 mph)
- Range: 3,800 nmi (7,000 km; 4,400 mi) at 14 kn (26 km/h; 16 mph)
- Endurance: 15 days
- Complement: 90
- Sensors & processing systems: Air search radar: Furke 2 (Furke-E, Positiv-ME1, SMILE Thales for export); Surface search radar: "Zaslon" Multi-purpose AESA radar; Fire control radar: Ratep 5P-10-02 Puma for A-190; Sonar: Zarya-M (Zarya-ME for export) suite, bow mounted. Vinyetka low frequency active/passive towed array; Navigation: Gorizont-25 integrated navigation system
- Electronic warfare & decoys: EW Suite: TK-25E-5 ECM; Countermeasures: 4 x PK-10 decoy launchers
- Armament: 1 × 100mm A-190 Arsenal naval gun; 1 × Kashtan CIWS-M (Project 20380); 2 × 4 Kh-35 (SS-N-25); 12 × Redut VLS cells (Project 20381); 2 × AK-630М CIWS; 2 × 4 330mm torpedo tubes for Paket-NK (Paket-NK/E for export) anti-torpedo/anti-submarine torpedoes; 2 × 14.5mm MTPU pedestal machine guns
- Aircraft carried: Hangar for Ka-27 Helicopter; Launch pad for UAV Orlan-10

Geroy Rossiyskoy Federatsii Aldar Tsydenzhapov (Russian: Герой Российской Федерации Алдар Цыденжапов, lit. 'Hero of the Russian Federation Aldar Tsydenzhapov') is a Steregushchiy-class corvette of the Russian Navy.

== Development and design ==
The Steregushchiy-class corvettes have a steel hull and composite material superstructure, with a bulbous bow and nine watertight subdivisions. They have a combined bridge and command centre, and space and weight provision for eight SS-N-25 missiles. Stealth technology was widely used during construction of the ships, as well as 21 patents and 14 new computer programs. Newest physical field reduction solutions were applied too. As a result, designers considerably reduced the ship's radar signature thanks to hull architecture and fire-resistant radar-absorbent fiberglass applied in tophamper's design.

The Kashtan CIWS on the first ship was replaced in subsequent vessels by 12 Redut VLS cells containing 9M96E medium-range SAMs of the S-400 / S-350 system. SS-N-27 (Kalibr Land Attack Cruise Missiles) will be fitted to a larger domestic version, Project 20385.

The export version known as Project 20382 Tigr carries either eight supersonic SS-N-26 (P-800 Oniks) anti-ship missiles or sixteen subsonic SS-N-25 'Switchblade' (Kh-35E Uran). It also carries two twin-tube launchers for 533mm heavy torpedoes. The A-190E 100mm gun first used in the Talwar-class frigates is controlled by a 5P-10E system that can track four targets simultaneously. Protection from air attacks is provided by the Kashtan CIWS and eight mounts for the SA-N-10 'Grouse' (9K38 Igla) SAM.

Starting from Aldar Tsydenzhapov, newly built ships of the class received an upgraded sensor mast containing the Zaslon radar system that was first installed in Gremyashchiy.

== Construction and career ==
Hero of the Russian Federation Aldar Tsydenzhapov was laid down on 22 July 2015, and launched on 12 September 2019 by Amur Shipyard in Komsomolsk. She was commissioned on 25 December 2020.

Between 3 and 10 June 2022, Aldar Tsydenzhapov, along with destroyer Admiral Panteleyev, corvettes Gromkiy, Sovershennyy and intelligence ship Marshal Krylov, took part in naval exercises in the Pacific Ocean. More than 40 warships and support vessels, as well as around 20 aircraft, were involved in the exercises.

In October 2024, corvettes Aldar Tsydenzhapov, Gromkiy and Rezkiy docked at Swettenham Pier in George Town, the capital city of the Malaysian state of Penang, where the crews attended a ceremony to commemorate the 110th anniversary of the Battle of Penang.

Between 28 March and 2 April 2025, corvettes Aldar Tsydenzhapov, Rezkiy and fleet tanker Pechanga participated in Exercise INDRA with the Indian Navy's INS Rana (D52) and INS Kuthar (P46).

== Gallery ==
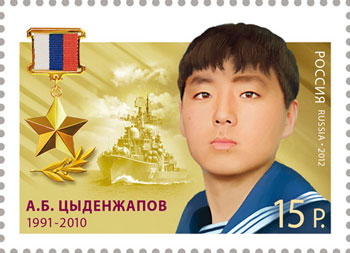
Ship's namesake Aldar Tsydenzhapov
