= Russian corvette Gromkiy =

Steregushchiy-class corvette of the Russian Navy

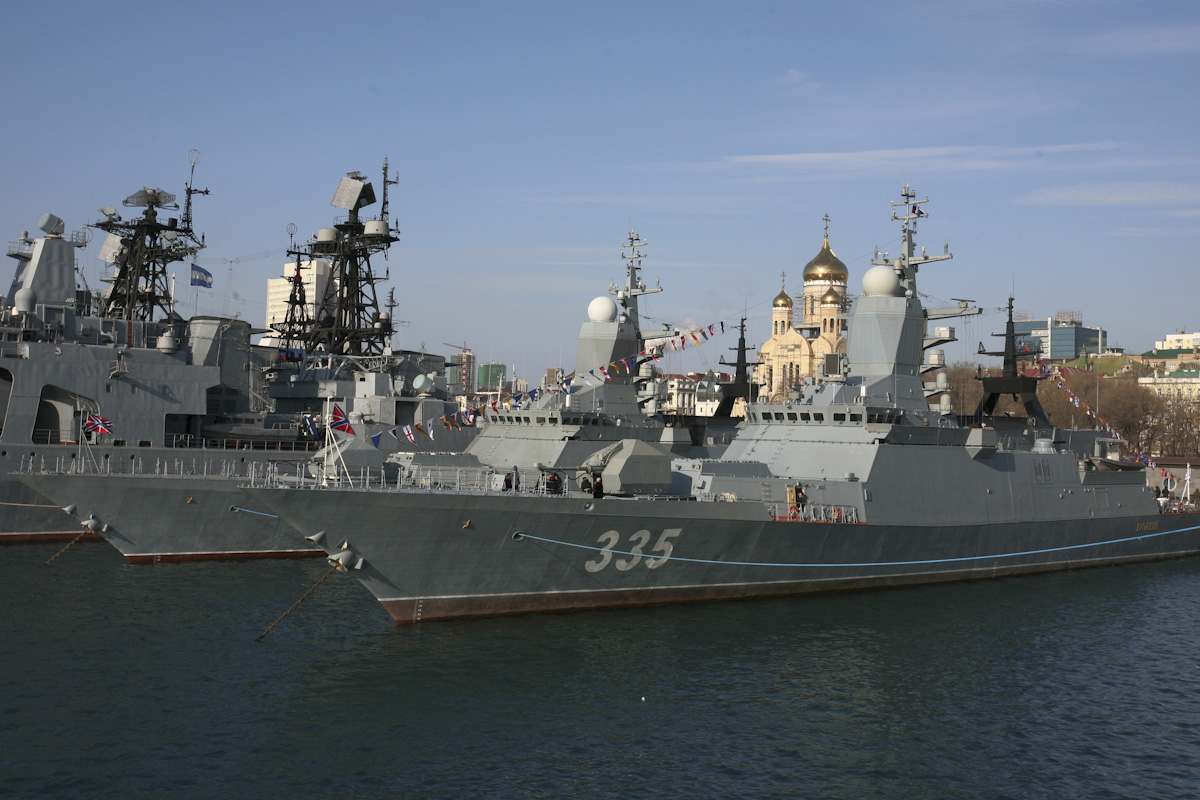
- Gromkiy on 25 December 2018

History

Russia
- Name: Gromkiy; (Громкий)
- Namesake: Gromkiy
- Builder: Amur Shipyard, Komsomolsk-on-Amur
- Laid down: 17 February 2012
- Launched: 28 July 2017
- Commissioned: 25 December 2018
- Home port: Vladivostok
- Identification: Pennant number: 335
- Status: Active

General characteristics
- Class & type: Steregushchiy-class corvette
- Displacement: Standard: 1,800 tons; Full: 2,200 tons
- Length: 104.5 m (343 ft)
- Beam: 13 m (43 ft); 11.6 m (38 ft) (waterline)
- Draught: 3.7 m (12 ft)
- Installed power: 380/220 V AC, 50 Hz, 4x630 kW diesel genset
- Propulsion: 2 shaft CODAD, 4 Kolomna 16D49 diesels 23,664 hp (17.6 MW)
- Speed: 27 kn (50 km/h; 31 mph)
- Range: 3,800 nmi (7,000 km; 4,400 mi) at 14 kn (26 km/h; 16 mph)
- Endurance: 15 days
- Complement: 90
- Sensors & processing systems: Air search radar: Furke 2 (Furke-E, Positiv-ME1, SMILE Thales for export); Surface search radar: Granit Central Scientific Institute Garpun-B/3Ts-25E/PLANK SHAVE radar; Monument targeting radar; Fire control radar: Ratep 5P-10E Puma for A-190; Sonar: Zarya-M (Zarya-ME for export) suite, bow mounted. Vinyetka low frequency active/passive towed array; Navigation: Gorizont-25 integrated navigation system
- Electronic warfare & decoys: EW Suite: TK-25E-5 ECM; Countermeasures: 4 x PK-10 decoy launchers
- Armament: 1 × 100mm A-190 Arsenal or 130mm A-192 naval gun; 1 × Kashtan CIWS-M (Project 20380); 2 × 4 Kh-35 (SS-N-25); 12 × Redut VLS cells (Project 20381); 2 × AK-630М CIWS; 2 × 4 330mm torpedo tubes for Paket-NK (Paket-NK/E for export) anti-torpedo/anti-submarine torpedoes; 2 × 14.5mm MTPU pedestal machine guns
- Aircraft carried: Hangar for Ka-27 helicopter; Launch pad for UAV Orlan-10

Gromkiy is a Steregushchiy-class corvette of the Russian Navy.

== Development and design ==
The Steregushchiy-class corvettes have a steel hull and composite material superstructure, with a bulbous bow and nine watertight subdivisions. They have a combined bridge and command centre, and space and weight provision for eight SS-N-25 missiles. Stealth technology was widely used during construction of the ships, as well as 21 patents and 14 new computer programs. Newest physical field reduction solutions were applied too. As a result, designers considerably reduced the ship's radar signature thanks to hull architecture and fire-resistant radar-absorbent fiberglass applied in tophamper's design.

The Kashtan CIWS on the first ship was replaced in subsequent vessels by 12 Redut VLS cells containing 9M96E medium-range SAMs of the S-400 system. SS-N-27 (Kalibr type missiles) will be fitted to a larger domestic version, Project 20385.

The export version known as Project 20382 Tigr carries either eight supersonic SS-N-26 (P-800 Oniks) anti-ship missiles or sixteen subsonic SS-N-25 'Switchblade' (Kh-35E Uran). It also carries two twin-tube launchers for 533mm heavy torpedoes. The A-190E 100mm gun first used in the Talwar-class frigates is controlled by a 5P-10E system that can track four targets simultaneously. Protection from air attacks is provided by the Kashtan CIWS and eight mounts for the SA-N-10 'Grouse' (9K38 Igla) SAM.

== Construction and career ==
Gromkiy was laid down on 17 February 2012, and launched on 28 July 2017 by Amur Shipyard in Komsomolsk. On February 7, 2018, the ship's readiness was 84%. At the end of May, the crew arrived at the Amur shipyard. In June, the occupation of the ship was started to ensure its sea trials and acceptance of the ship from the shipbuilder. In August, he was transferred to Vladivostok for testing. She was commissioned on 25 December 2018.

On 15 November 2019, Gromkiy conducted a live fire test in the Sea of Japan.

Between 3 and 10 June 2022, Gromkiy, along with destroyer Admiral Panteleyev, corvettes Sovershennyy, Aldar Tsydenzhapov and intelligence ship Marshal Krylov, took part in naval exercises in the Pacific Ocean. More than 40 warships and support vessels, as well as around 20 aircraft, were involved in the exercises.

In October 2024, corvettes Gromkiy, Aldar Tsydenzhapov and Rezkiy docked at Swettenham Pier in George Town, the capital city of the Malaysian state of Penang, where the crews attended a ceremony to commemorate the 110th anniversary of the Battle of Penang.

Later on November 4 to November 8, 2024, Gromkiy would participate in Orruda 2024 exercise in Surabaya between Russia and Indonesia alongside other Russian corvettes being RF Aldar Tsydenzhapov and RF Soversheny while Indonesia sent the frigate KRI I Gusti Ngurah Rai-332 and the corvette KRI Frans Kaisiepo-368. The ship remained active as of 2025 and 2026.

== Gallery ==
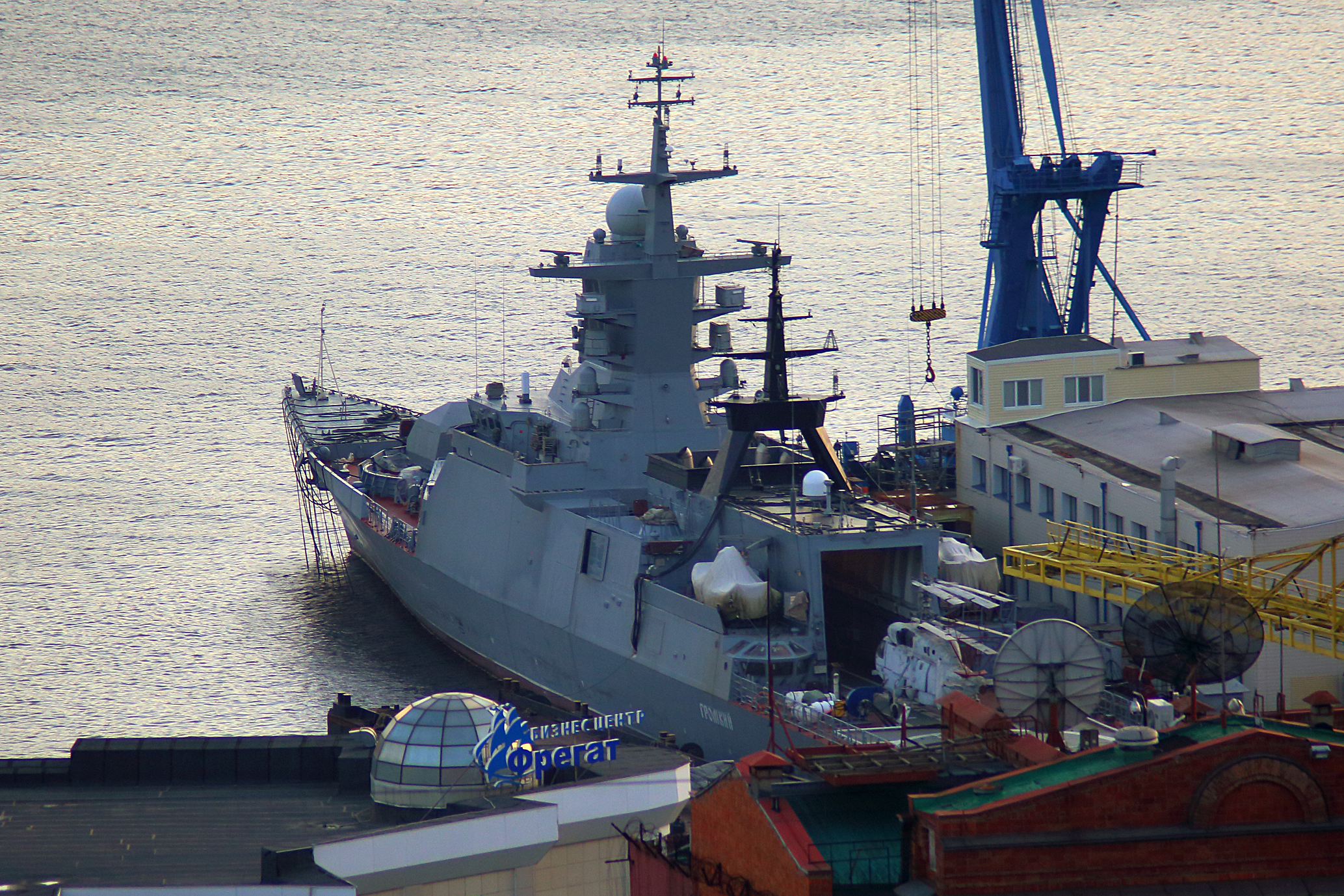
Gromkiy on 25 December 2018.

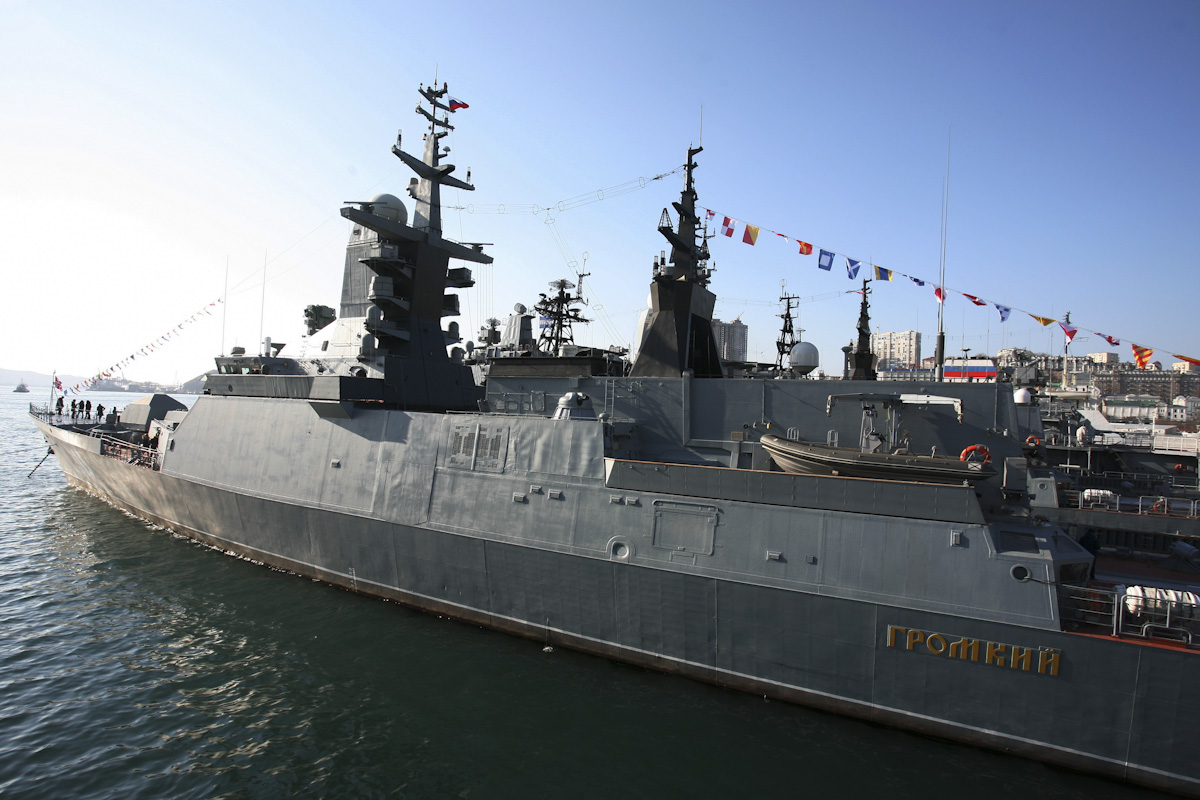
Gromkiy on 25 December 2018.

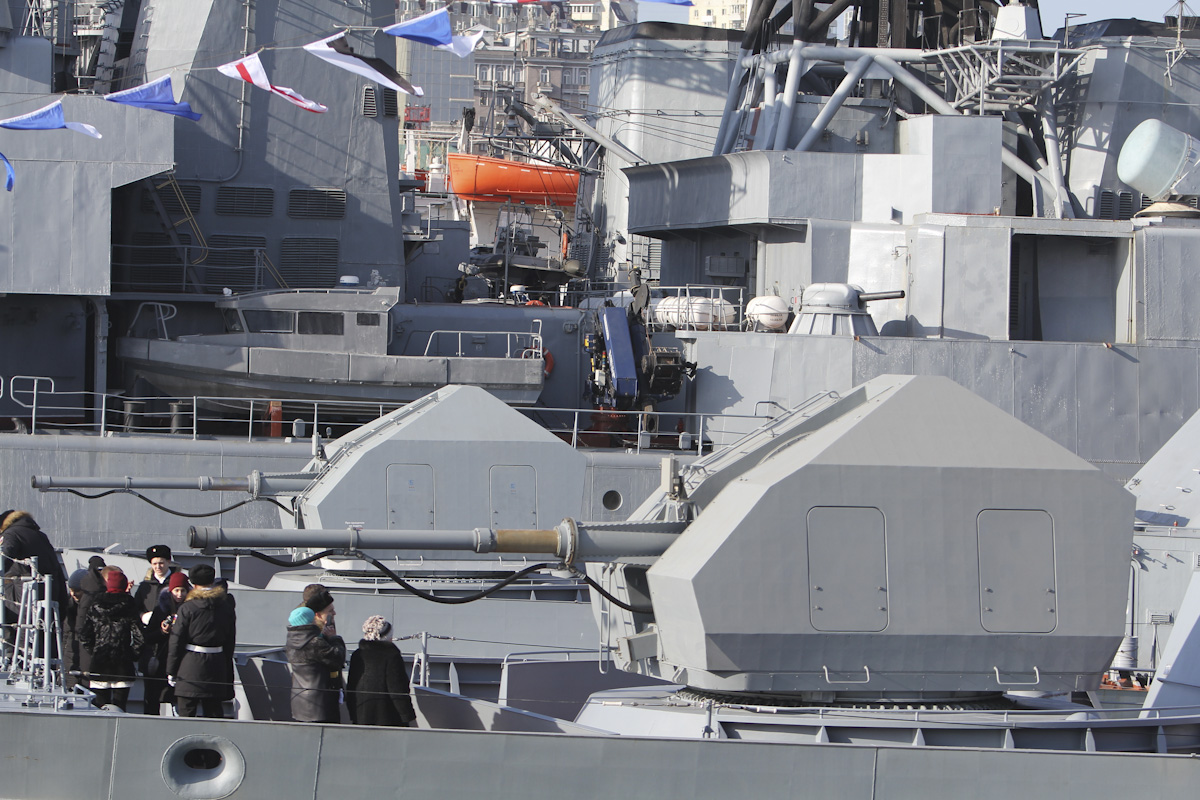
Gromkiy on 25 December 2018.

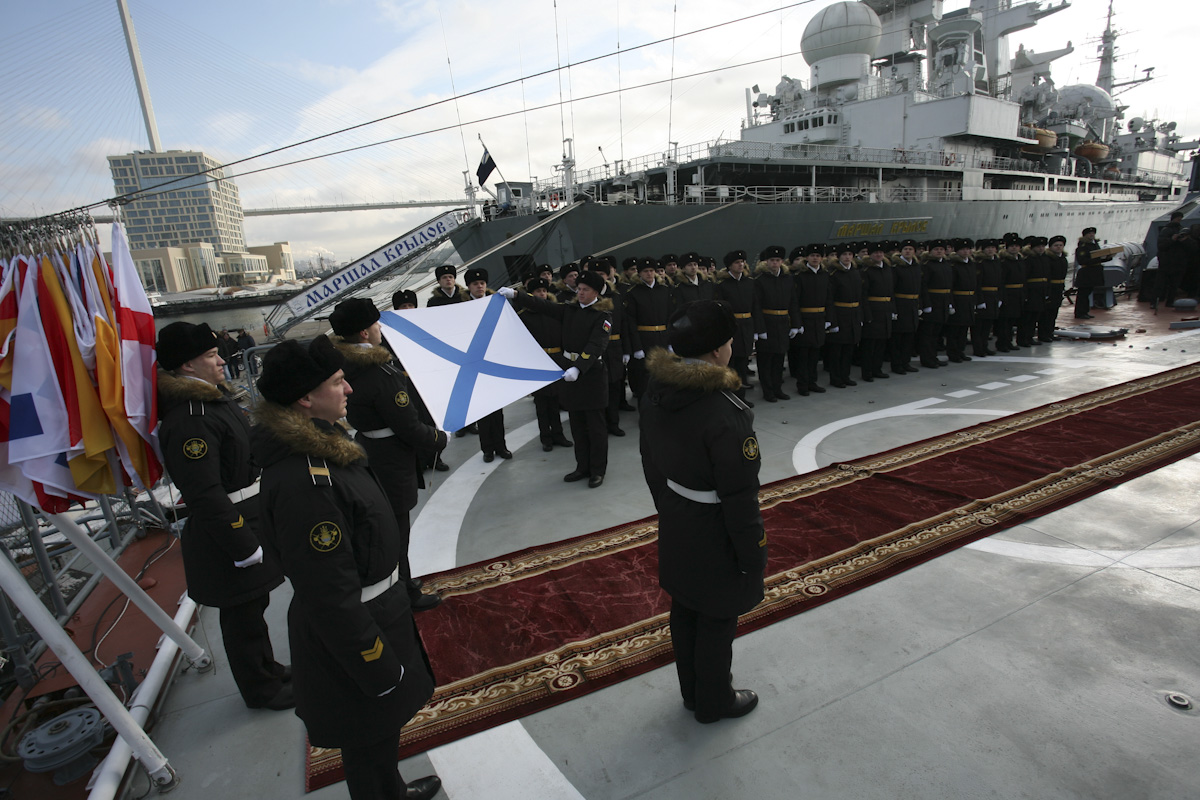
Gromkiy on 25 December 2018.

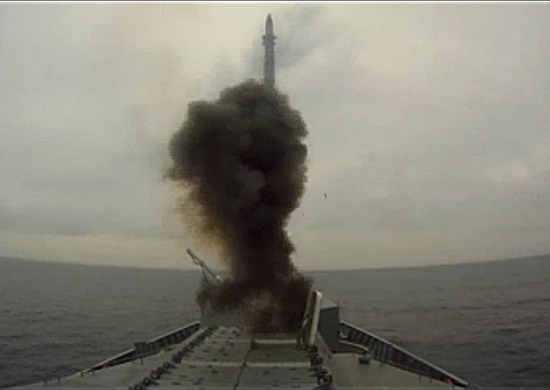
Missile launch from the corvette of the Pacific Fleet "Gromkiy"
