= Russian corvette Merkury =

Steregushchiy-class, project 20380 corvette of the Russian Navy

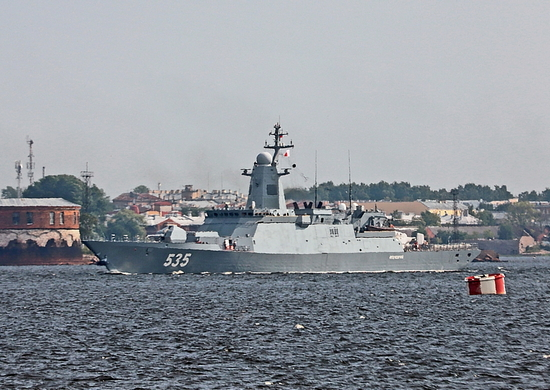
- Merkury during sea trials, 2022

History

Russia
- Name: Merkury (Меркурий)
- Namesake: Russian brig Merkuriy
- Builder: Severnaya Verf, Saint Petersburg
- Way number: 535
- Laid down: 20 February 2015 as Retiviy
- Launched: 12 March 2020
- Acquired: 11 May 2023
- Commissioned: 13 May 2023
- Renamed: 15 October 2021
- Status: Partially sunk after explosion

General characteristics
- Class & type: Steregushchiy-class corvette
- Displacement: Standard: 1,800 tons; Full: 2,200 tons
- Length: 104.5 m (342 ft 10 in)
- Beam: 13 m (42 ft 8 in); 11.6 m (38 ft 1 in) (waterline)
- Draught: 3.7 m (12 ft 2 in)
- Installed power: 380/220 V AC, 50 Hz, 4x630 kW diesel genset
- Propulsion: 2 shaft CODAD, 4 Kolomna 16D49 diesels 23,664 hp (17.6 MW)
- Speed: 27 knots (50 km/h; 31 mph)
- Range: 3,800 nmi (7,000 km; 4,400 mi) at 14 kn (26 km/h; 16 mph)
- Endurance: 15 days
- Complement: 90
- Sensors & processing systems: Air search radar: Furke 2; Surface search radar: Granit Central Scientific Institute Garpun-B/3Ts-25E/Plank shave radar; Monument targeting radar; Fire control radar: Ratep 5P-10E Puma for A-190; Sonar: Zarya-M suite, bow mounted. Vinyetka low frequency active/passive towed array; Navigation: Gorizont-25 integrated navigation system
- Electronic warfare & decoys: EW Suite: TK-25E-5 ECM; Countermeasures: 4 × PK-10 decoy launchers
- Armament: 1 × 100 mm A-190 Arsenal or 130 mm A-192 naval gun; 1 × Kashtan CIWS-M; 2 × 4 Kh-35 (SS-N-25); 2 × AK-630М CIWS; 2 × 4 330 mm torpedo tubes for Paket-NK anti-torpedo/anti-submarine torpedoes; 2 × 14.5 mm MTPU pedestal machine guns
- Aircraft carried: Hangar for Ka-27 Helicopter; Launch pad for UAV Orlan-10

Merkury (Russian: Меркурий) was a Steregushchiy-class corvette of the Russian Navy. The original name for the corvette was Retivy (Ретивый) prior to 2021.

The ship was left mostly submerged following an explosion and fire while anchored in the port of Benghazi, Libya, in November 2026.

== Development and design ==
The Steregushchiy-class corvettes (Стерегущий) have a steel hull and composite material superstructure, with a bulbous bow and nine watertight subdivisions. They have a combined bridge and command centre, and space and weight provision for eight Kh-35 missiles. Newest physical field reduction solutions were applied too. As a result, designers considerably reduced the ship's radar signature thanks to hull architecture and fire-resistant radar-absorbent fiberglass applied in tophamper's design. Stealth technology was widely used during construction of the ships, as well as 21 patents and 14 new computer programs.

The Kashtan CIWS on the first ship was replaced in subsequent 20381 vessels by 12 Redut VLS cells containing 9M96E medium-range SAMs of the S-350 system.

It also carries two twin-tube launchers for 533 mm heavy torpedoes. The A-190E 100 mm gun first used in the Talwar-class frigates is controlled by a 5P-10E system that can track four targets simultaneously. Protection from air attacks is provided by the Kashtan CIWS and eight mounts for the 9K38 Igla SAM.

== Construction and service ==
The ship was laid down on 20 February 2015 as Retiviy, and launched on 12 March 2020 by Severnaya Verf in Saint Petersburg. In April 2020, the ship's crew was formed. The crew arrived in St. Petersburg at the beginning of May 2020 for training. The ship was originally planned to go for sea trials at the end of 2020. However, mooring trials were first initiated in October 2021. While the transfer to the Black Sea Fleet was scheduled for the end of 2021, as of January 2022 the vessel remained on trials.

The name of the ship was changed to Merkury in 2021. The ship was reported to have started sea trials in May 2022 and was reported as planned for commissioning in October. In October it was reported that commissioning may have been postponed into 2023. The ship was commissioned on 13 May 2023.

In late 2024, amid heightened tensions with NATO during the Russo-Ukrainian war, Merkury was deployed as an escort for a Russian tanker on its way through the Baltic Sea. The ships were shadowed by the German frigate Nordrhein-Westfalen. Near Bornholm the Germans deployed a NH 90 helicopter for closer investigation. Four flares were fired from Merkury towards the helicopter.

== Explosion ==
On 22 November 2026, the Government of National Stability, a quasi-state which controls Eastern Libya, stated that an explosion had occurred aboard a Russian ship docked in the Port of Benghazi, following a suspected drone attack on the port. Merkury had been undergoing resupply under an established maritime cooperation agreement. In an official statement, the GNS condemned the suspected attack, describing it as a serious attack on the sovereignty of Libya and the security of its ports. The GNS indicated that it suspected the explosion was related to the Russo-Ukrainian war and stated that Libya was not a party in that conflict. The Merkury was left partially submerged following the explosion and subsequent fire, with only the bow visible above the surface.
