= Russian corvette Sovershennyy =

2015 Steregushchiy-class corvette of the Russian Navy

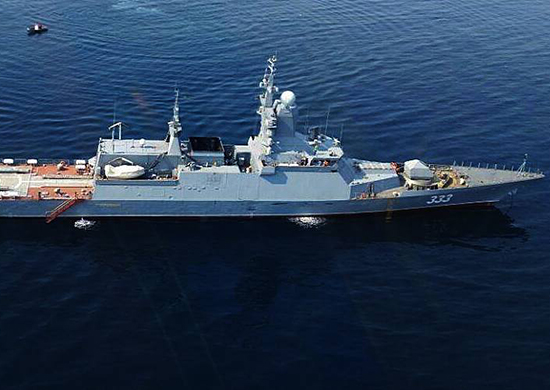
- Russian corvette Sovershennyy

History

Russia
- Name: Sovershennyy
- Builder: Komsomolsk Shipyard
- Laid down: 30 June 2006
- Launched: 22 May 2015
- Commissioned: 20 July 2017

General characteristics
- Class & type: Steregushchy-class corvette
- Displacement: 2,200 tons full load
- Length: 104.5 m (343 ft)
- Beam: 11.1 m (36 ft)
- Draught: 3.7 m (12 ft)
- Propulsion: 2 shaft CODAD, 4 16D49 diesels 24,000hp (17.9 MW), power supply AC 380/220 V, 50 Hz, 4x630 kW diesel genset
- Speed: 26 knots (48 km/h; 30 mph)
- Range: 4,000 nmi (7,400 km) at 14 knots (26 km/h; 16 mph)
- Endurance: 15 days
- Complement: 100
- Sensors & processing systems: Air search radar: Furke-E 3D, E/F band Monument targeting radar
- Electronic warfare & decoys: TK-25E-5 ECM, 4 x PK-10 decoy launchers
- Armament: 1 × Arsenal A-190 100mm; 2 × MTPU pedestal 14.5 machine gun; 12 Cell Redut VLS; 9M96E/M; 9M100 SAM quadpacked configuration; 8 × 3M24 Uran missiles; 2 × AK-630M CIWS; 2 × 4 330mm torpedo tubes (for Paket-NK anti-sub/anti-torpedo torpedoes)
- Aircraft carried: Helipad for Ka-27 helicopter

Sovershennyy (Russian: Совершенный, lit. 'Perfect') is a corvette in the Steregushchy-class in service with the Russian Navy. The ship was laid down in 2006 and launched in 2015. She commenced sea trials in early 2017 and joined the Russian Pacific Fleet on 20 July 2017. She was the first large surface warship to join the Pacific Fleet in 25 years.

Between 3 and 10 June 2022, Sovershennyy, along with destroyer Admiral Panteleyev, corvettes Gromkiy, Aldar Tsydenzhapov and intelligence ship Marshal Krylov, took part in naval exercises in the Pacific Ocean. More than 40 warships and support vessels, as well as around 20 aircraft, were involved in the exercises.

The ship was reported active in both 2025 and 2026. She participated in a four-day good will visit to Bangladesh in March 2026 along with the Russian Navy ship Rezkiy.
