= Steregushchiy-class corvette =

Class of corvettes of the Russian Navy

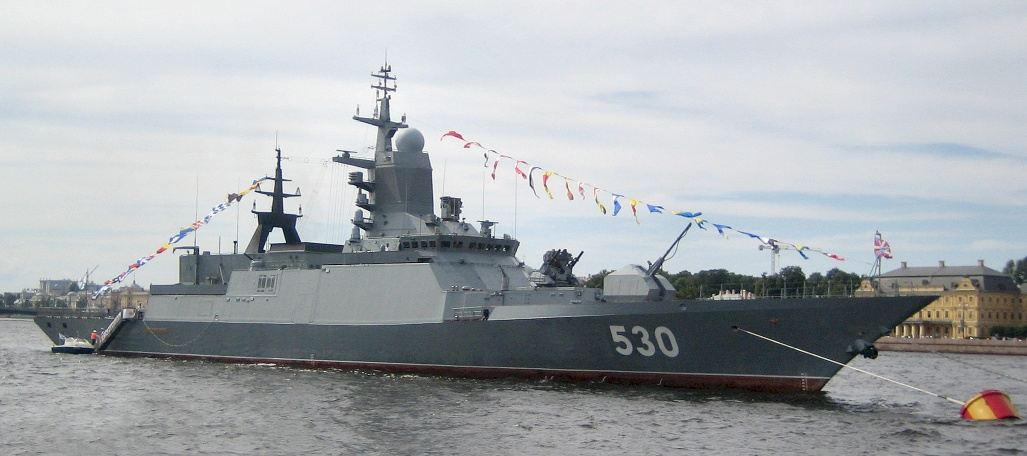
- The corvette Steregushchiy

Class overview
- Name: Steregushchiy class
- Builders: Severnaya Verf; Amur Shipyard
- Operators: Russian Navy
- Preceded by: Grisha class
- Succeeded by: Gremyashchiy class
- Subclasses: Project 20382 Tigr (export); Project 20385 (domestic); Project 20386 (domestic)
- Cost: US$120–150M (est. for Tigr)
- Built: 2001–present
- In commission: 2008–present
- Planned: 12 (20380/81)
- Building: 3 (20381)
- Completed: 9 (20380/81)
- Active: 7 (20380/81)
- Lost: 2 (Merkury, Boikiy)

General characteristics
- Type: Guided missile corvette
- Displacement: Standard: 1,800 tons; Full: 2,200 tons
- Length: 104.5 m (342 ft 10 in)
- Beam: 13 m (42 ft 8 in); 11.6 m (38 ft 1 in) (waterline)
- Draught: 3.7 m (12 ft 2 in)
- Installed power: 380/220 V AC, 50 Hz, 4x630 kW diesel genset
- Propulsion: 2 shaft CODAD, 4 Kolomna 16D49 diesels 23,664 hp (17.6 MW)
- Speed: 27 knots (50 km/h; 31 mph)
- Range: 3,800 nmi (7,000 km; 4,400 mi) at 14 kn (26 km/h; 16 mph)
- Endurance: 15 days
- Complement: 90
- Sensors & processing systems: Air search radar: Furke 2 (Furke-E, Positiv-ME1, SMILE Thales for export); From Retiviy and Hero of the Russian Federation Aldar Tsydenzhapov onwards: Multi-purpose radar Zaslon (X- and S-band); Surface search radar: Granit Central Scientific Institute Garpun-B/3Ts-25E/PLANK SHAVE radar; Monument targeting radar; Fire control radar: Ratep 5P-10E Puma for A-190; Sonar: Zarya-M (Zarya-ME for export) suite, bow mounted. Vinyetka low frequency active/passive towed array; Navigation: Gorizont-25 integrated navigation system
- Electronic warfare & decoys: EW Suite: TK-25E-5 ECM; Countermeasures: 4 x PK-10 decoy launchers
- Armament: 1 × 100 mm A-190 Arsenal or 130 mm A-192 naval gun; 2 × AK-630М CIWS (Project 20381); 2 × 4 Kh-35 (SS-N-25); 12 Redut VLS cells (Project 20381) (9M100 missiles can be quadpacked); 2 × 4 330 mm torpedo tubes for Paket-NK (Paket-NK/E for export) anti-torpedo/anti-submarine torpedoes; 2 × 14.5 mm MTPU pedestal machine guns
- Aircraft carried: Hangar for Ka-27 helicopter; Launch pad for Orlan-10 UAV

The Steregushchiy class (Russian: Стерегущий, lit. 'Guarding'), Russian designation Project 20380, is a class of corvettes being built for the Russian Navy. Designed by the Almaz Central Marine Design Bureau, subsequent vessels were built to an improved design (Project 20381), incorporating the Zaslon-Redut SAM system. The ship full displacement and dimensions are large for a corvette, thus it is designated as a frigate by NATO. The Steregushchiy class has been further developed into the Gremyashchiy class (Project 20385) and Project 20386 subclasses. The export variant is known as Project 20382 Tigr.

== History ==
The ships of the Steregushchiy class are multipurpose corvettes, designed to replace the Grisha class. Such ships are used for littoral zone operations, engagement of enemy submarines and surface ships, and gun support of landing operations. The first batch built at the Severnaya Verf shipyard in St. Petersburg consists of four ships. A second building line has been started at Komsomolsk-on-Amur. The lead ship of this second batch was named Sovershennyy.

The Russian Navy has publicly announced that they expect to buy at least 30 of these ships, for all four major fleets.

According to Jane's Naval Forces News, the first vessel was commissioned on 14 November 2007.

An additional order of eight corvettes of the project 20380 (and an additional two of the project 20385) was made in August 2020. Some of the ships may reportedly be built at the Amur Shipyard as destined for the Pacific Fleet, while others could be built at Severnaya Verf. As of November 2020, the allocation between shipyards for the ten new vessels had still to be decided. In December 2020 it was announced that the Amur Shipyard would build six new corvettes (two Project 20380 and four Project 20385) for the Pacific Fleet with projected service entry between 2024 and 2028. Construction was to begin in 2021.

== Design ==
The Steregushchiy-class corvettes have a steel hull and composite material superstructure, with a bulbous bow and nine watertight subdivisions. They have a combined bridge and command centre, and space and weight provision for eight SS-N-25 missiles. Stealth technology was widely used during construction of the ships, as well as 21 patents and 14 new computer programs. Newest physical field reduction solutions were applied. As a result, designers considerably reduced the ship's radar signature thanks to hull architecture and fire-resistant radar-absorbent fiberglass applied in tophamper's design.

The Kashtan CIWS on the first ship was replaced in subsequent vessels by twelve Redut VLS cells, containing 9M96E medium-range SAMs of the S-400 system. SS-N-27 (Kalibr type missiles) will be fitted to a larger domestic version, Project 20385. For anti-submarine warfare, the ships are equipped with two 4-tube launchers of the Paket-NK ASW system.

The export version known as Project 20382 Tigr carries either eight supersonic SS-N-26 (P-800 Oniks) anti-ship missiles or sixteen subsonic SS-N-25 'Switchblade' (Kh-35E Uran). It also carries two twin-tube launchers for 533 mm heavy torpedoes instead of Paket-NK on the domestic version. The A-190E 100 mm gun first used in the Talwar-class frigates is controlled by a 5P-10E system that can track four targets simultaneously. Protection from air attacks is provided by the Kashtan CIWS and eight mounts for the SA-N-10 'Grouse' (9K38 Igla) SAM.

Starting from Aldar Tsydenzhapov, newly built ships of the class received an upgraded sensor mast containing the Zaslon radar system, that was first installed on the Project 20385 corvette Gremyashchiy.

== Export ==
In 2007, the Indonesian Navy made an agreement in principle, pending a full contract, for four vessels of this type to replace their ageing Dutch-built Fatahillah-class corvettes. The first was to be built in Spain and fitted out in St. Petersburg, leaving open the option of Indonesian involvement in building the subsequent ships. This agreement appears to have lapsed; in 2011 Indonesia signed a deal for two Ada-class corvettes from Turkey. Rosoboronexport have briefed Singapore and the United Arab Emirates on the vessel.

The first actual contract for the export version, Project 20382 Tigr, was signed at the 5th International Maritime Defense Show in St. Petersburg in July 2011 when Algeria ordered two ships. The cost was estimated at US$120–150 million per ship. One was to be delivered to the Algerian Navy in 2014 and one in 2015. Over five years later, the IISS Military Balance 2020 did not list any such vessels in service with the Algerian Navy (IISS MB 2020, p. 341).

== Operational history ==
- Steregushchiy started sea trials in November 2006 and was commissioned in the Baltic Fleet on 14 November 2007.
- Soobrazitelnyy, the second ship in the class, was launched on 31 March 2010 and was expected to start sea trials in November/December 2010. The ship was commissioned in October 2011.
- Boikiy was commissioned in May 2013.
- Stoikiy was commissioned in May 2014. Flag-raising ceremony was conducted in July 2014.
- Sovershennyy was launched in 2015 and joined the Pacific Fleet in late July 2017.
- Gromkiy was commissioned in December 2018.
- Hero of the Russian Federation Aldar Tsydenzhapov was commissioned in December 2020.
- Merkury was commissioned in May 2023.
- Rezkiy was commissioned in September 2023.

=== 2017 ===
On 14 October 2017, Soobrazitelny, Boikiy and tanker Kola embarked a deployment to the Mediterranean Sea and the Red Sea. The ships returned to their homeport on 14 January 2018 and were greeted by the commander of the Baltic Fleet Vice-Admiral Aleksandr Nosatov.

=== 2020 ===
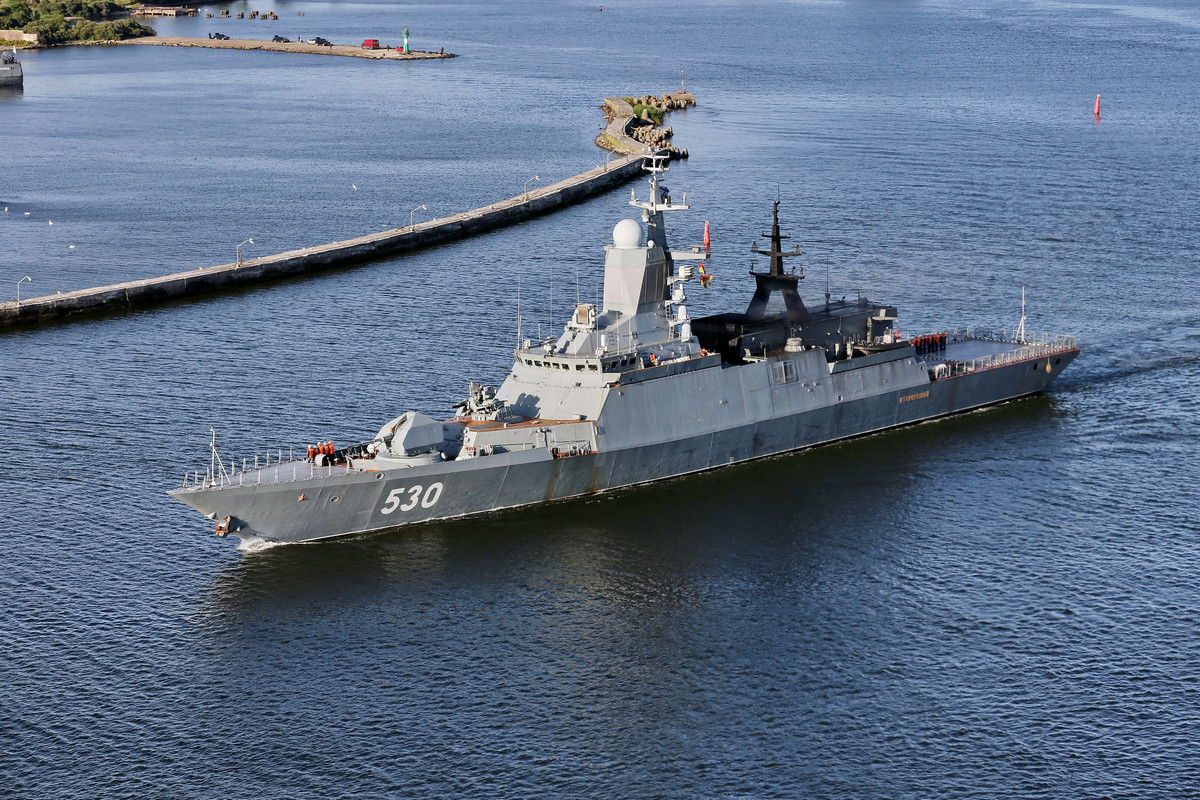
Steregushchiy in 2018

The first six corvettes participated in a large-scale exercise of the Russian Navy in March–April 2020. The exercise has been suggested to be an answer to the largest NATO post-Cold War simulation of amphibious landing in Europe "Defender 2020".

The Russian exercise started with corvette Stoikiy and tank landing ship (LST) Korolyov being deployed to the North Sea in early March. In mid and late March, the three remaining corvettes saw deployments as well. Boikiy was active in the southern North Sea, together with LSTs Minsk and Kaliningrad, while Steregushchiy and Soobrazitelnyy were active in the central North Sea. Auxiliary ships present included the tug Nikolay Chiker, tankers Kola and Akademik Pashin, as well as special-purpose ship Yantar.

Adding Yaroslav Mudry's deployment to the Indian Ocean, all active major surface combatants of the Baltic Fleet were active at the same time, which was an unprecedented event at the time and can be roughly compared only with the "Ocean Shield 2019" exercise, where two LSTs, three corvettes and a frigate were active in the Baltic Sea. At the same time, frigates Admiral Grigorovich, Admiral Essen and Admiral Makarov of the Black Sea Fleet were active. On 26 March, the combined Russian force with two Black Sea Fleet frigates, three corvettes and two LSTs of the Baltic Fleet was tracked by a nine-ship strong Royal Navy squadron.

At the Pacific Fleet, Sovershennyy and Gromkiy held an exercise along with cruiser Varyag, destroyers Bystryy, Admiral Tributs, Admiral Panteleyev, tracking ship Marshal Krylov and icebreakers Sadko, Ivan Susanin, as well as civilian icebreaker Kapitan Khlebnikov in the Sea of Japan. Another exercise was held in the Bering Sea by corvettes MPK-82, MPK-107, Ust-Ilimsk, Kholmsk, Moroz, Razliv, Iney, Smerch and two minesweepers.

The second stage of the exercise started on 8 April, when Steregushchiy, Soobrazitelnyy, and Stoikiy were again deployed to the Baltic Sea. A day earlier, frigate Admiral Kasatonov, submarine Sankt Peterburg and tug Pamir of the Northern Fleet were reported to be in the Norwegian Sea on their way to the Baltic Sea as well.

The intense period of exercises continued in mid April. At the Pacific Fleet they involved one LST and six anti-ship corvettes. At the Northern Fleet they included two anti-ship, three anti-submarine corvettes and supposedly six nuclear submarines. The Baltic Fleet held three more exercises involving two LSTs, six anti-ship corvettes, two anti-submarine corvettes as well as other ships. Boikiy was deployed to the English Channel with tanker Akademik Pashin on 30 April.

In November–December 2020, corvettes Steregushchiy, Boikiy, and tanker Kola took part in an unusually intensive Russian naval activity in the North Sea and areas near the United Kingdom. The deployments could have been an answer to the sailing of US, British and Norwegian warships to the Barents Sea for the first time after the Cold War earlier in 2020. Destroyer Severomorsk, accompanied by the tanker Sergey Osipov had been active in the area, as well and shortly afterwards destroyer Vice-Admiral Kulakov, accompanied by the tanker Akademik Pashin and intelligence ship Viktor Leonov.

Vice-Admiral Kulakov, unusually, sailed west of the United Kingdom, in the area where the Russian Navy hasn't been known to be active since 2009 (in 2012 there was a friendly port call of Vice-Admiral Kulakov to Cork). Russian ships in the area included submarine Staryy Oskol, tug Kapitan Guryev and patrol ship Vasily Bykov.

=== 2021 ===
During the February–March exercises of the Baltic Fleet, Boikiy, Soobrazitelnyy, and Steregushchy were active in the Baltic Sea, along with frigate Yaroslav Mudry, anti-ship corvettes Mytishchy, Sovetsk, Odintsovo, Zelenyy Dol, Serpukhov, Morshansk, Zarechnyy, Passat, anti-submarine corvettes Aleksin and Kabardino-Balkariya, LSTs Minsk and Korolyov, tanker Aleksandr Grebenshchikov, tug Anatoly Ptytsyn, research vessel Sibiryakov, minesweepers and other ships. The crews of the warships conducted artillery fires against targets simulating enemy warships and air attack weapons.

On 18 February, conventional submarine Rostov-na-Donu and escort tug Nikolay Muru transited the area towards the Mediterranean Sea, as well. Finally, an amphibious landing exercise has been held with landing craft Michman Lermontov, Leytenant Rimskiy Korsakov, D-325, Mordoviya and others.

=== 2022 ===
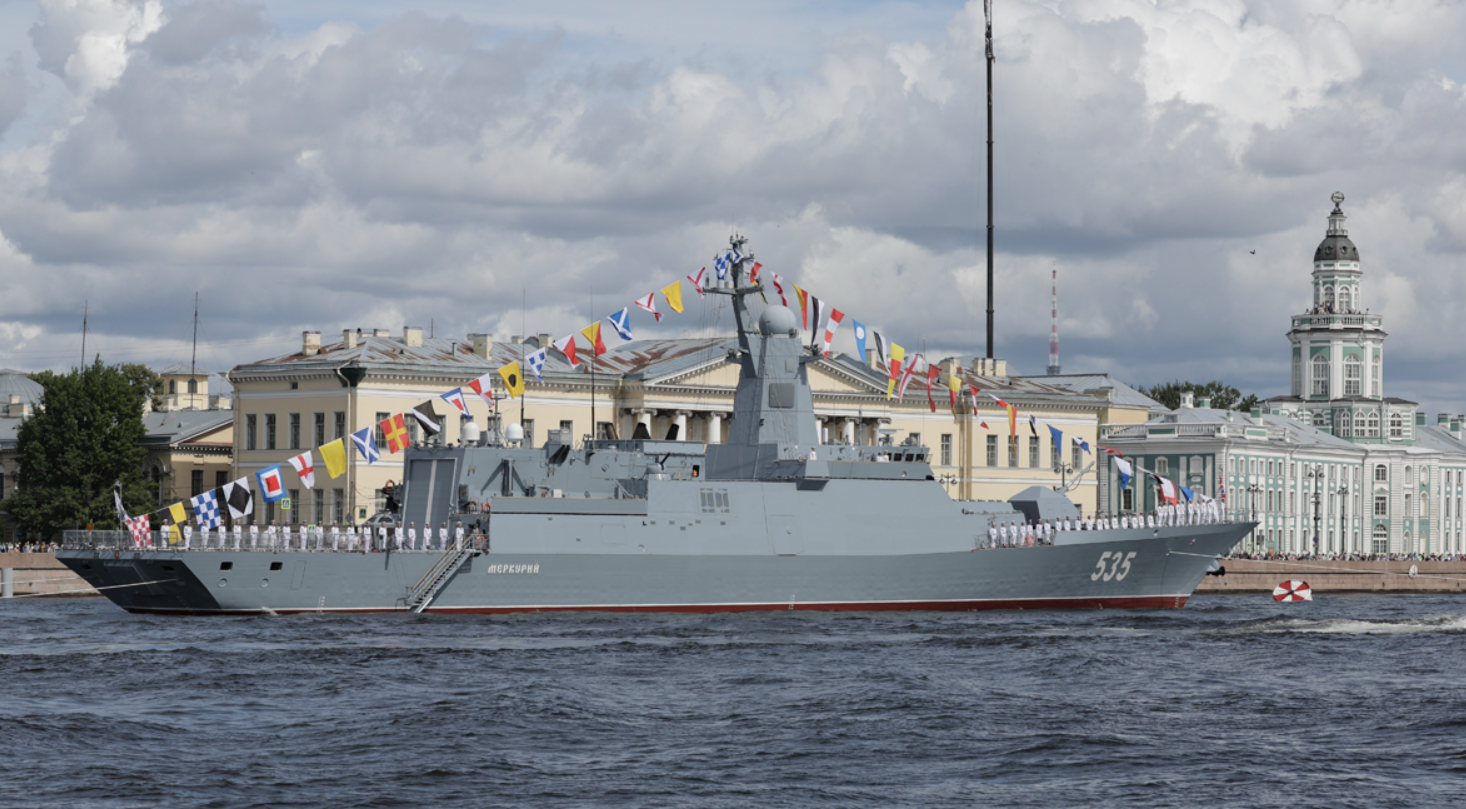
Corvette Merkury at the naval parade in St. Petersburg. July 2022

In January, a Russian Baltic Fleet task force made up of corvettes Stoikiy and Soobrazitelny departed from the naval base of Baltiysk for a long-distance deployment. As part of the long distance deployment the two corvettes carried out naval exercises in the Atlantic outside of the Irish exclusive economic zone along with other ships and then visited Algeria. In February the corvettes Sovershennyy, Gromkiy, Hero of the Russian Federation Aldar Tsydenzhapov of the Pacific fleet and 18 other combat ships and supply vessels including Project 20385 corvette Gremyashchiy, the frigates Marshal Shaposhnikov, the destroyer Admiral Panteleyev and the command ship Marshal Krylov carried out naval exercises at training grounds in the Sea of Japan and the Sea of Okhotsk.

From 21 to 27 December 2022, the Project 20380 corvettes Hero of the Russian Federation Aldar Tsydenzhapov , Sovershennyy along with Marshal Shaposhnikov and Pacific Fleet flagship Varyag carried out joint drills in the East China Sea with the Chinese Navy.

=== 2024 ===
In October 2024, corvettes Rezkiy, Hero of the Russian Federation Aldar Tsydenzhapov and Gromkiy docked at Swettenham Pier in George Town, the capital city of the Malaysian state of Penang, where the crews attended a ceremony to commemorate the 110th anniversary of the Battle of Penang.

=== 2025 ===
Between 28 March and 2 April 2025, corvettes Aldar Tsydenzhapov, Rezkiy and fleet tanker Pechanga participated in Exercise INDRA with the Indian Navy's INS Rana and INS Kuthar.

=== 2026 ===
On 3 June 2026, Boikiy was struck by Ukrainian drones, while in dry dock at Veleshchynskyi, Kronstadt Naval base and set ablaze; the extent of damage is not publicly known. On 22 November, in Benghazi, an explosion occurred aboard the Steregushchiy-class corvette Merkury, likely destroying it.

== Ships ==
Italics indicate estimates

Name	Hull No.	Builders	Laid down	Launched	Commissioned	Fleet	Status
Steregushchiy	530	Severnaya Verf, St. Petersburg	21 December 2001	16 May 2006	28 February 2008	Baltic	Undergoing modernization
Soobrazitelny	531	Severnaya Verf, St. Petersburg	20 May 2003	31 March 2010	14 October 2011	Baltic	Active as of 2026
Boikiy	532	Severnaya Verf, St. Petersburg	27 July 2005	15 April 2011	16 May 2013	Baltic	Future fate currently unknown, heavily damaged by fire, potentially destroyed on 3 June 2026
Sovershennyy	333	Amur Shipyard, Komsomolsk-on-Amur	30 June 2006	22 May 2015	20 July 2017	Pacific	Active as of 2025
Stoikiy	545	Severnaya Verf, St. Petersburg	10 November 2006	30 May 2012	18 July 2014	Baltic	Active as of 2026
Gromkiy	335	Amur Shipyard, Komsomolsk-on-Amur	17 February 2012	28 July 2017	25 December 2018	Pacific	Active as of 2026
Merkury	535	Severnaya Verf, St. Petersburg	20 February 2015	12 March 2020	13 May 2023	Black Sea	Destroyed in port, Libya, 22 November 2026
Strogiy		Severnaya Verf, St. Petersburg	20 February 2015		?	Black Sea	Under construction
Hero of the Russian Federation Aldar Tsydenzhapov	339	Amur Shipyard, Komsomolsk-on-Amur	22 July 2015	12 September 2019	25 December 2020	Pacific	Active as of 2025
Rezkiy	343	Amur Shipyard, Komsomolsk-on-Amur	1 July 2016	1 July 2021	14 September 2023	Pacific	Active as of 2025
Grozniy		Amur Shipyard, Komsomolsk-on-Amur	23 August 2021	23 October 2026	?	Pacific	Fitting out
Braviy		Amur Shipyard, Komsomolsk-on-Amur	29 September 2021		?	Pacific	Under construction

== See also ==
- List of ships of the Soviet Navy
- List of ships of Russia by project number
- Gremyashchiy-class corvette
- Project 20386 corvette

=== Equivalent modern corvettes ===
- Diponegoro class – (Netherlands)
- Braunschweig class – (Germany)
- Kamorta class – (India)
- Ada class – (Turkey)
- Sa'ar 6 class – (Israel)
- Pohjanmaa class – (Finland)
