= Russian corvette Steregushchiy =

2006 Steregushchiy-class corvette

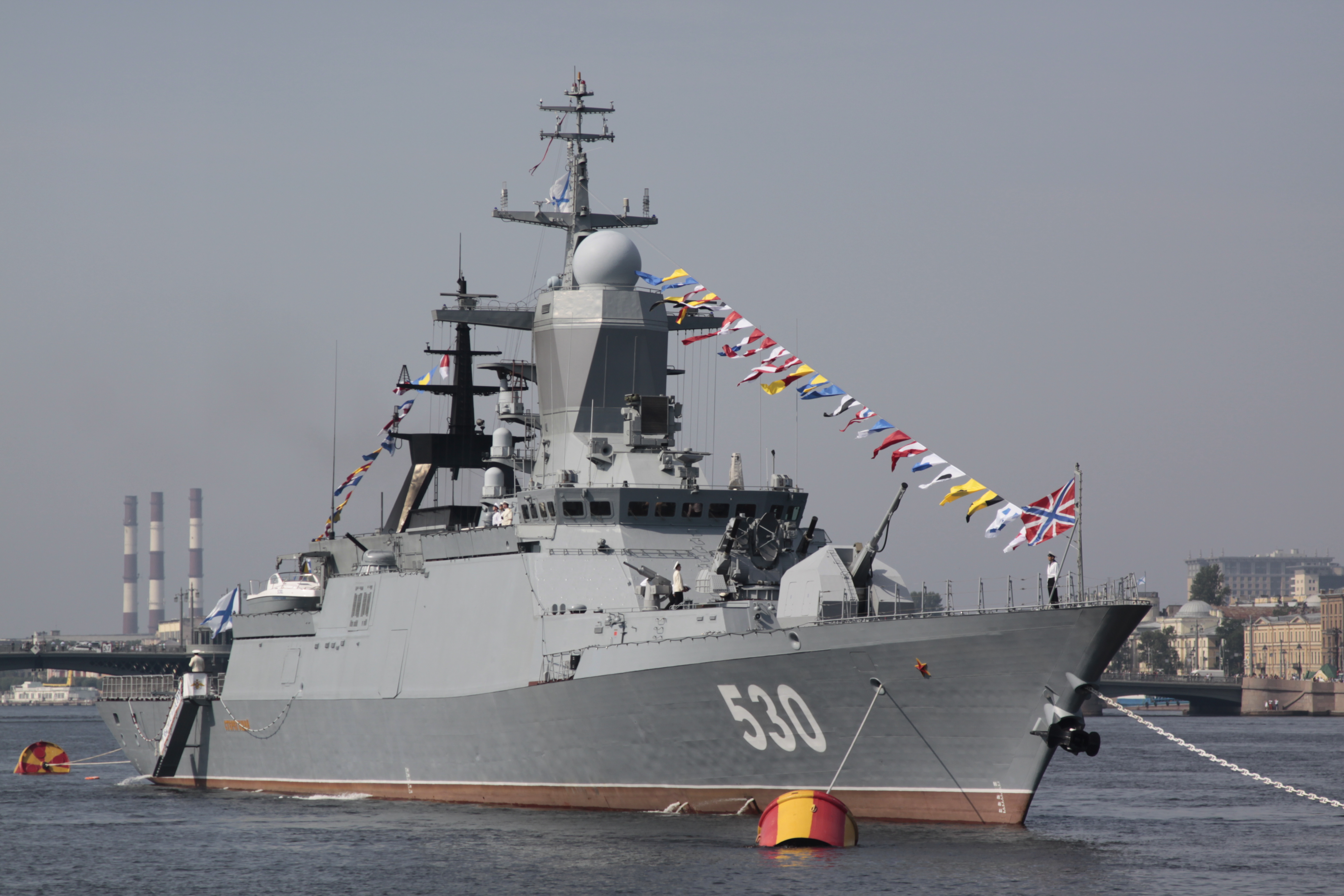
- Russian corvette Steregushchiy

History

Russia
- Name: Steregushchiy
- Builder: Severnaya Verf
- Laid down: 21 December 2001
- Launched: 16 May 2006
- Commissioned: 14 November 2007
- Status: In refit

General characteristics
- Class & type: Steregushchiy-class corvette
- Displacement: 2,100 tons
- Length: 104.5 m (342 ft 10 in)
- Beam: 11.1 m (36 ft 5 in)
- Draught: 3.7 m (12 ft 2 in)
- Propulsion: 2 shaft CODAD, 4 16D49 diesels 24.000hp (17.9 MW), power supply AC 380/220 V, 50 Hz, 4x630 kW diesel genset
- Speed: 27 knots (50 km/h; 31 mph)
- Range: 4,000 nmi (7,400 km) at 14 knots (26 km/h; 16 mph), 15 days endurance
- Complement: 100
- Sensors & processing systems: Air search radar: Furke-E 3D, E/F band
- Electronic warfare & decoys: TK-25E-5 ECM, 4 x PK-10 decoy launchers
- Armament: 1 × Arsenal A-190 10 0mm; 1 × Kashtan CIWS; 2 × AK-630М CIWS; 8 × 3M24 Uran missiles; 2 × 4 330 mm torpedo tubes (for Paket-NK anti-sub/anti-torpedo torpedoes); 2 × 14.5 mm MTPU pedestal machine guns
- Aircraft carried: Helipad for Ka-27 Helicopter

Steregushchiy (Russian: Стерегущий, lit. 'Watchful') is the lead ship of the latest class of corvettes of the Russian Navy, the Steregushchiy class. The ship was built by the Severnaya Verf shipyard in St. Petersburg and was laid down in December 2001, launched in May 2006 and joined the Russian Navy on 14 November 2007.

As of early 2023, the ship was reported as likely to undergo a major refit at the Kronshtadt shipyard which would incorporate Kalibr-NK cruise missiles and Redut air defense missiles. The corvette was also to receive a new power plant system during her modernization.

In total, the Russian Navy have publicly announced that they expect to buy at least 20 of these ships, for all four major fleets.

As of 2026, Stereguschiy is undergoing modernization.

== Sources ==
- Russian warfare on Steregushchiy
