= Russian corvette Derzky =

Class of warship for the Russian Navy

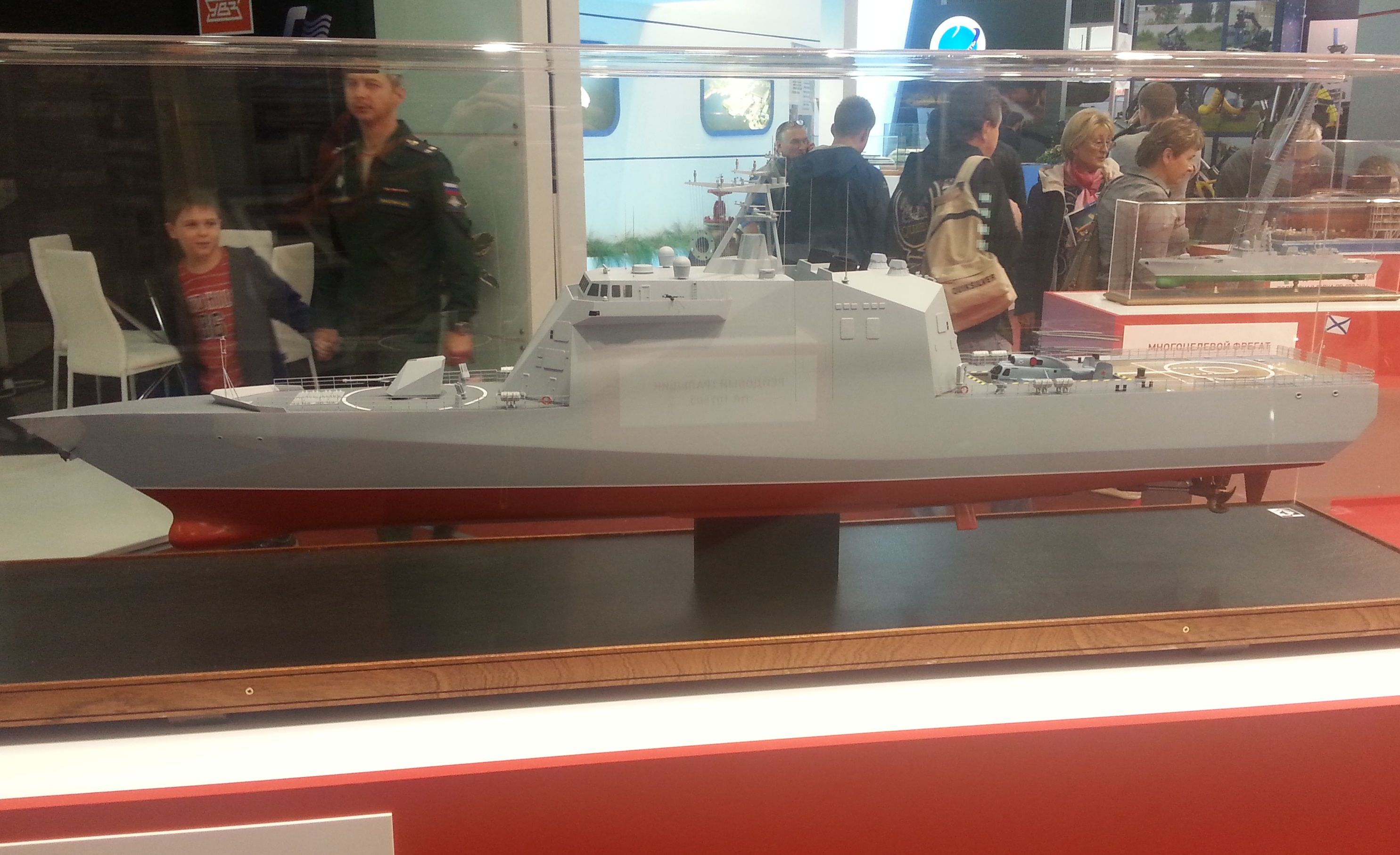

Class overview
- Name: Project 20386
- Builders: Severnaya Verf
- Operators: Russian Navy
- Preceded by: Gremyashchiy class
- Built: 2016–present
- Planned: 10
- Building: 1
- Canceled: 9

General characteristics
- Type: Guided missile corvette
- Displacement: 3,400 tons
- Length: 109 m (357.6 ft)
- Beam: 13 m (42.7 ft)
- Propulsion: 2x Saturn M90FR gas turbine engine (27000hp) 20.58 MW with 2x electroengine each 2200 hp (or secondary can be M70FRU or M70FRU2 E80D7 M85RU/FR for cruise , diesel (Kolomna Plant, Penzadieselmash or RUMO, else) or other GT from different builder)
- Speed: 30 knots (56 km/h; 35 mph)
- Range: 5,000 nmi (9,300 km; 5,800 mi)
- Armament: Guns; 1 × 100 mm A-190 Arsenal; 2 × 30 mm AK-630M CIWS; 2 × 14.5 mm MTPU machine guns; Missiles; 8 (2 × 4) VLS cells for Kalibr or Oniks anti-ship/cruise missiles; 16 (2 × 8) Redut VLS cells for surface-to-air missiles; Torpedoes; 8 (2 × 4) launchers for Paket-NK anti-torpedo/anti-submarine torpedoes
- Aviation facilities: Helipad and hangar for Kamov Ka-27 helicopter

Derzky is the sole member of the Russia's Project 20386 class corvette. All ships of Project 20386 except Derzki have been canceled. The ship is being constructed by Severnaya Verf for the Russian Navy. The ship is larger than Steregushchiy and Gremyashchiy classes, incorporating a more stealthy design. As originally conceived, there were plans to build a series of at least ten such corvettes.

== History ==
The ship was laid down on 28 October 2016 and is expected to enter service after 2020. In February 2019, the technical readiness of the vessel reached 12%. On 9 April 2019, Russian Defence Minister Sergey Shoygu announced, the ship will be named Merkuriy (Mercury). However, the name may have been again changed to Derzky.

In July 2021, the superstructure of Derzky was delivered to Severnaya Verf.

On 31 May 2023, it was reported that the corvette would be redesigned for further development of innovative solutions.

On 7 July 2023, however, TASS quoted a source in the Russian defense industry that reported there would be no further construction of corvettes under the Project 20386 in its current form, with the program effectively being closed. The main reasons for this is due to the high cost and new technologies of the corvettes. Instead, more Steregushchiy-class and Gremyashchiy-class corvettes will be built by Severnaya Verf and the Amur Shipbuilding Plant.

== Ships ==
| Name | Builders | Laid down | Launched | Commissioned | Fleet | Status |
|---|---|---|---|---|---|---|
| Derzky | Severnaya Verf, Saint Petersburg | 28 October 2016 | March 2021 | | | Fitting out |
