= INS Kuthar (P46) =

Khukri class corvette

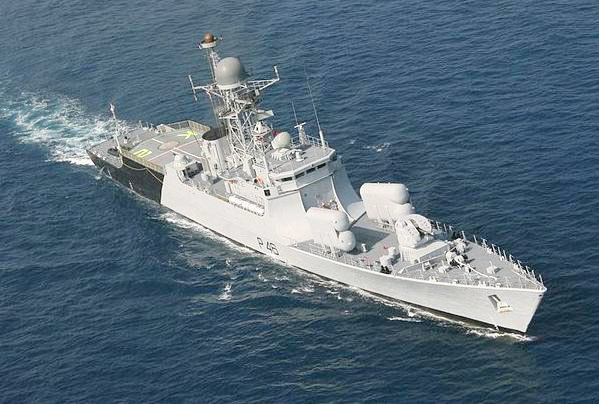
- INS Kuthar

History
- Name: INS Kuthar
- Namesake: "Battle axe"
- Builder: Mazagon Dock Limited
- Laid down: 13 September 1986
- Launched: 15 April 1989
- Commissioned: 7 June 1990
- Identification: IMO number: 9000008; MMSI number: 419100120; Callsign: VVWK; Pennant number: P46
- Status: Active

General characteristics
- Class & type: Khukri-class corvette
- Displacement: 1350 tons (full load)
- Length: 91.1 metres
- Beam: 10.5 metres
- Draught: 4.5 metres
- Propulsion: 2 diesel engines with 14,400hp; 2 shafts
- Speed: 25 knots (50 km/h)
- Range: 4,000 nmi (7,400 km) at 16 knots (30 km/h)
- Complement: 79 (incl. 10 officers)
- Sensors & processing systems: MR 352 Pozitiv-E radar; Garpun-Bal radar; Bharat 1245 navigation radar
- Armament: 4 × P-20M (SS-N-2D) AShMs; 2 × Strela-2M (SA-N-5) SAM; 1 × AK–176 76mm gun; 2 × 30mm AK-630 guns
- Aircraft carried: 1 helicopter (HAL Chetak)

INS Kuthar (P46) is a Khukri-class corvette, currently in service with the Indian Navy. It was designed by Indian naval architects and built at the Mazagon Dock in Mumbai. INS Kuthar was part of Western Naval Command till 1998 later it moved to be part of Eastern Naval Command. It was damaged in a mishap that occurred on 15 July 2014. The mishap occurred after the naval ship returned to its base in the Andaman and Nicobar Command in rough weather after completing a mission.

== Etymology ==
The INS Kuthar is named after a kuthar, the Hindi word for a handheld battle axe.

== Service history ==
On 3 March 2025, Kuthar arrived at the Port of Colombo, Sri Lanka, on an official visit under the command of Commander Nitin Sharma. The vessel is scheduled to depart the island on 6 March 2025 upon completing its mission.

== Maritime exercise ==
- Kuthar was one of the six ships of Eastern Naval Command which was part of a naval exercise in the Bay of Bengal on the eve of Navy week celebrations in the year 2005.
- Missile corvette Kuthar along with INS Satpura and INS Ranvijay represented the Indian Navy in the first ever Japan-India maritime exercise (JIMEX) which was held in the Bay of Bengal from 19 December to 22 December 2013.
- Between 28 March and 2 April 2025, Kuthar and INS Rana (D52) participated in Exercise INDRA with the Russian Navy's Pechanga (Dubna class), Rezkiy (Steregushchiy class), Aldar Tsydenzhapov (Steregushchiy class).

== Incidents ==
- Sub Lieutenant Tejveer Singh died on Tuesday October 11, 2016 onboard the INS Kuthar after he accidentally fired his 9mm pistol. Singh fired the round accidentally at around 1430 hours and was injured. He was then shifted to Naval Hospital INHS Kalyani in Visakhapatnam where he succumbed to his injuries.
- The Kuthar collided with the destroyer INS Ranvir in the Bay of Bengal in August 2009. The reason for the collision was found to be a rudder failure, further compounded by a flawed naval maneuver.
