= Russian corvette Soobrazitelny =

Steregushchiy-class corvette

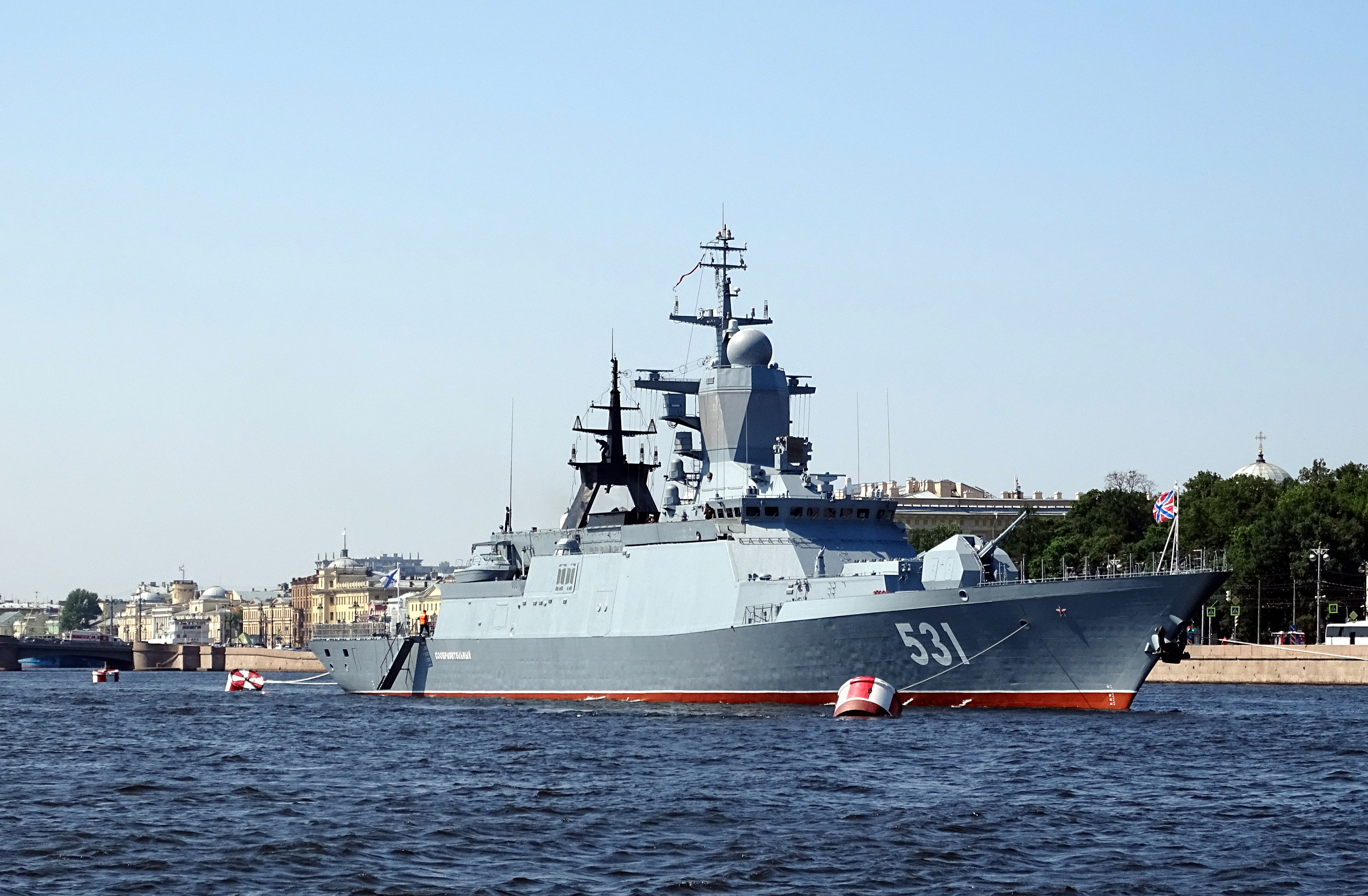
- Soobrazitelny anchored in Saint Petersburg, July 2018

History

Russia
- Name: Soobrazitelny
- Builder: Severnaya Verf
- Laid down: 20 May 2003
- Launched: 31 March 2010
- Commissioned: 14 October 2011
- Honours and awards: Guards designation, 1 March 2012
- Status: In service

General characteristics
- Class & type: Steregushchiy-class corvette
- Displacement: 2,100 tons full load
- Length: 104.5 m (342 ft 10 in)
- Beam: 11.1 m (36 ft 5 in)
- Draught: 3.7 m (12 ft 2 in)
- Propulsion: 2 shaft CODAD, 4 16D49 diesels 24,000 hp (18,000 kW), power supply AC 380/220 V, 50 Hz, 4 × 630 kW diesel genset
- Speed: 27 knots (50 km/h; 31 mph)
- Range: 4,000 nmi (7,400 km) at 14 knots (26 km/h; 16 mph)
- Endurance: 15 days
- Complement: 100
- Sensors & processing systems: Air search radar: Furke-E 3D, E/F band Monument targeting radar
- Electronic warfare & decoys: TK-25E-5 ECM, 4 x PK-10 decoy launchers
- Armament: 1 × Arsenal A-190 100 mm; 2 × MTPU pedestal 14.5 mm machine gun; 12 Cell Redut VLS; 9M96E/M SAM; 9M100 SAM quadpacked configuration; 8 × 3M24 Uran missiles; 2 × AK-630М CIWS; 2 × 4 330 mm torpedo tubes (for Paket-NK anti-sub/anti-torpedo torpedoes)
- Aircraft carried: Helipad for Ka-27 Helicopter

Soobrazitelny (Russian: Сообразительный, lit. 'Smart/Astute') is the second ship of the Steregushchiy-class corvette (officially known as Project 20380) built for the Russian Navy in the early 21st century.

== Description ==
The ship is the first of the class to be fitted with the Redut system intended to increase its anti-aircraft capabilities with respect to the Kashtan CIWS previously used.

== Construction and service ==
Soobrazitelny was laid down at the Severnaya Verf shipyard in Saint Petersburg on 20 May 2003. She was launched in late March 2010 and was shown to the public for the first time at the fifth International Maritime Defence Show (IMDS-2011) in St. Petersburg. The corvette began state testing in July 2011 and joined the Baltic Fleet on 14 October of that year, when her acceptance certificate was signed. Soobrazitelny was designated Guards on 1 March 2012 and received a battle flag inherited from her predecessors with the same name on 29 July of that year.

In April 2017, Soobrazitelny and her sister Boykiy were escorted through the English Channel by HMS Sutherland.

Soobrazitelny and Stoikiy entered the Mediterranean in October 2022. Between 18–21 October, they visited Algeria. In late November, both corvettes were absent from Tartus, likely shadowing French aircraft carrier, deployed to the East Mediterranean. On 5 December, they were in Tartus. In April 2023, the corvette, accompanied by Stoikiy and the frigate Admiral Grigorovich, was reported to have left the Mediterranean, transitting via the Atlantic to the Baltic. She was reported back in the Atlantic in June. The ship sighted southbound Storebælt 2 January 2024

The ship was one of the main characters shown in the RT channel documentary series "The Baltic Fleet".

The corvette was reported active escorting Russian shadow fleet tankers as of early 2026.
