= INDRA (naval exercise) =

Indian/Russian naval exercise

Naval flotilla during INDRA 2007

INDRA NAVY is a joint, biennial military exercise conducted by India and Russia starting in 2003. The exercise is tasked with boosting cooperation and interoperability between the Russian and Indian navies. The word INDRA is a portmanteau of the participants' respective countries. The exercise involves live firing drills, as well as air defence and anti submarine operations. Additionally, counterpiracy, terrorism and drug smuggling operations are carried out.

== Background ==
The end of the Cold War which brought greatly reduced defense budgets saw a collapse in ship building and naval activity in Russia throughout the 1990s. During this time, the Russian navy had no presence in the Indian Ocean. This changed in 2001, when a contingent of naval ships, including anti-submarine warfare vessels and a tanker docked at Mumbai. In April 2003, nine warships of the Russian navy departed from their bases at Sevastopol in the Black Sea and Vladivostok for the Indian Ocean. These units engaged in a number of exercises with the Indian navy. Russian Defence Minister Sergei Ivanov proposed joint naval exercises to be held later that year.

The 8th edition was hosted by the Eastern Naval Command of the Indian Navy in 2015 and included the Harbour Phase in Visakhapatnam from 7 to 9 December and the Sea Phase from 10 to 12 December in the Bay of Bengal. The naval ships deployed in the Indra Navy-15 included destroyer INS Ranvijay, frigate INS Sahyadri, submarine INS Sindhuvir and fleet support ship INS Shakti from the Eastern Fleet of the Indian Navy and missile cruiser Varyag, destroyer Bystry, rescue ocean going tug Alatau and fleet tanker Boris Butoma of the Pacific Fleet of the Russian Navy.

The 12th edition took place in the Volgograd, Russia from 1st to 13th August 2021. An Indian Army contingent from Mechanised Infantry Regiment also took part in the exercise. The contingent from both the nations consisted of 250 personnel each.

The 13th edition was hosted in Bay of Bengal by India in November 2023. Russia had sent two destroyers from its Pacific Fleet including Admiral Tributs and Admiral Panteleyev.

The 14th edition of the exercise was hosted off the coast of Chennai, India from 28 March to 2 April 2025 and included the Harbour phase (28 to 30 March) in Chennai and the Sea Phase (31 March to 2 April) in Bay of Bengal. The Russian Navy sent ships from its Pacific Fleet including Pechanga (Dubna class), Rezkiy (Steregushchiy class), Aldar Tsydenzhapov (Steregushchiy class). Meanwhile, the Indian Navy deployed INS Rana (D52), INS Kuthar (P46) and one Boeing P-8I Neptune.

The 15th edition of the exercise was hosted in Vladivostok, Russia from 13 to 18 October 2026. INS Sahyadri (F49) arrived in the city on 10 October.

== Image gallery ==
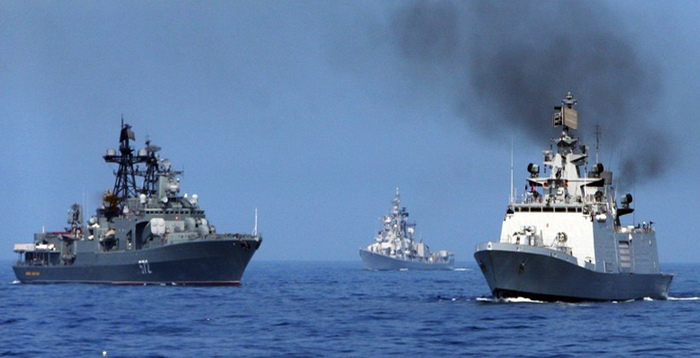
Naval maneuvers during Exercise INDRA 14

An Indian Navy Ka-28 Helix helicopter during INDRA 07

Naval ship of the IN during INDRA 07

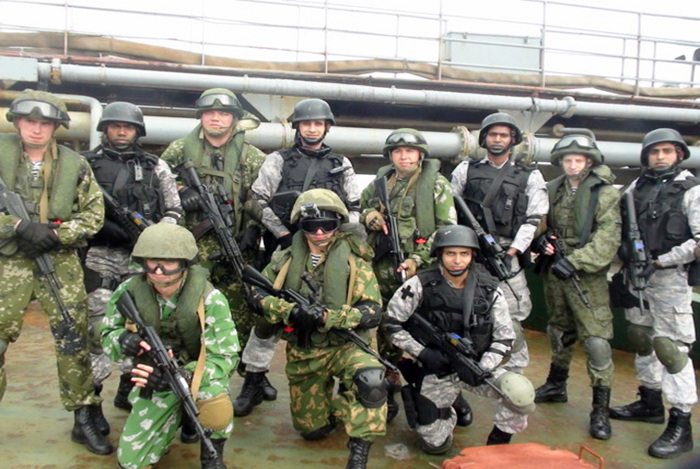
Joint Indian & Russian boarding team during Exercise INDRA 2014

== See also ==
- Indradhanush
