= Russian destroyer Admiral Panteleyev =

Russian Udaloy-class destroyer

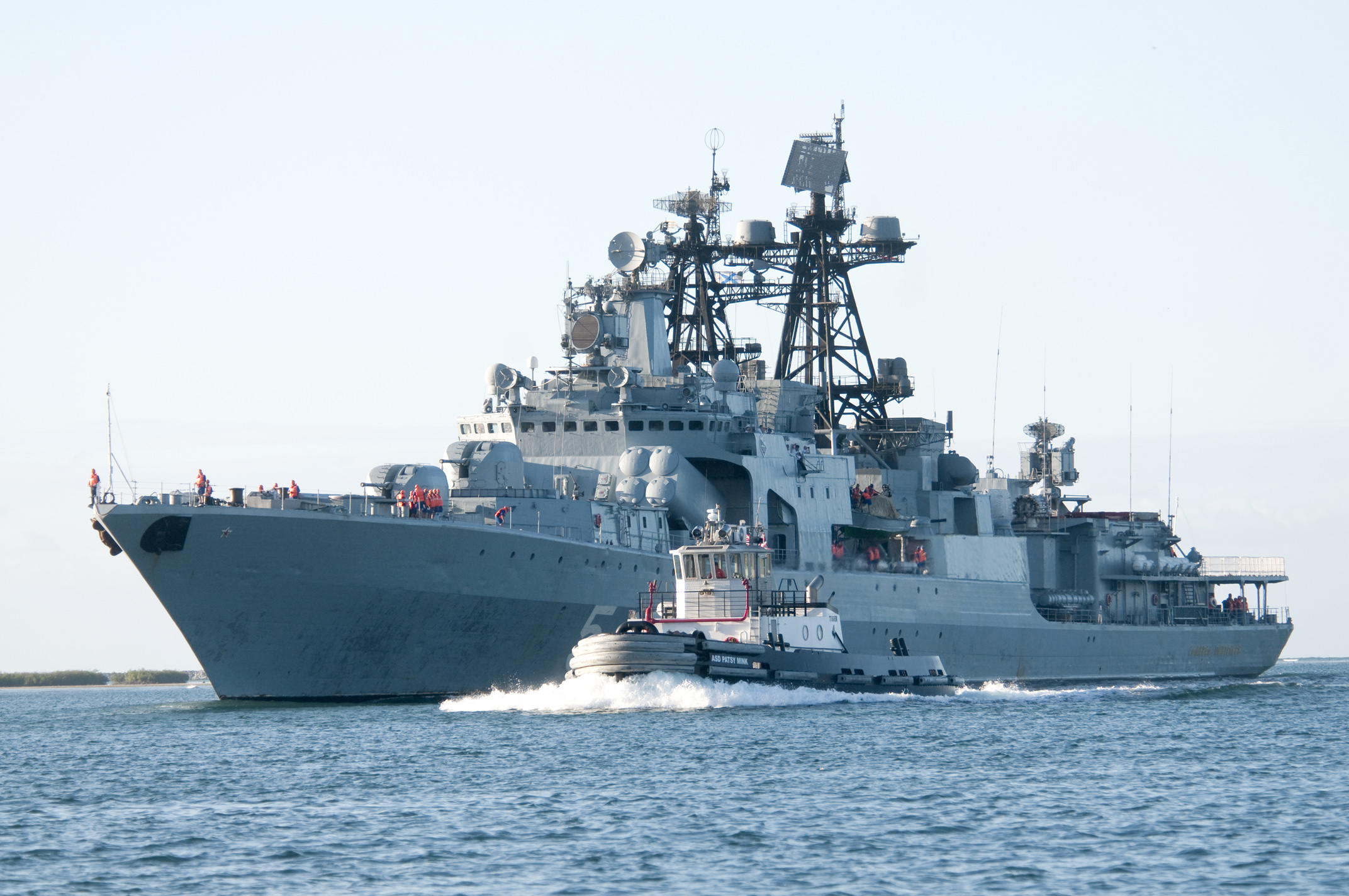

History

Russia
- Name: Admiral Panteleyev
- Namesake: Yuri Aleksandrovich Panteleyev
- Laid down: 24 May 1987
- Launched: 1988
- Commissioned: 1 May 1992
- Status: in active service

General characteristics
- Class & type: Udaloy-class destroyer
- Displacement: 6,200 t (6,102 long tons) standard; 7,900 t (7,775 long tons) full load
- Length: 163 m (535 ft)
- Beam: 19 m (62 ft)
- Draught: 7.8 m (26 ft)
- Propulsion: 2 shaft COGAG, 4 gas turbines, 89,000 kW (120,000 hp)
- Speed: 35 knots (65 km/h; 40 mph)
- Range: 10,500 nautical miles (19,400 km) at 14 knots (26 km/h; 16 mph)
- Complement: 300
- Armament: 2 × 4 SS-N-14 anti-submarine missiles; 8 × vertical launchers for SA-N-9 surface-to-air missiles; 2 × 1 100 mm (3.9 in) guns; 4 × AK-630; 2 × 4 553 mm (21.8 in) torpedo tubes, Type 53 ASW/ASuW torpedo; 2 × RBU-6000 anti submarine rocket launchers
- Aircraft carried: 2 x Ka-27 'Helix' series helicopters
- Aviation facilities: Helicopter deck and hangar

Admiral Panteleyev is an Udaloy-class destroyer ("large anti-submarine ship") of the Russian Navy. She is named after Yuri Aleksandrovich Panteleyev.

== History ==
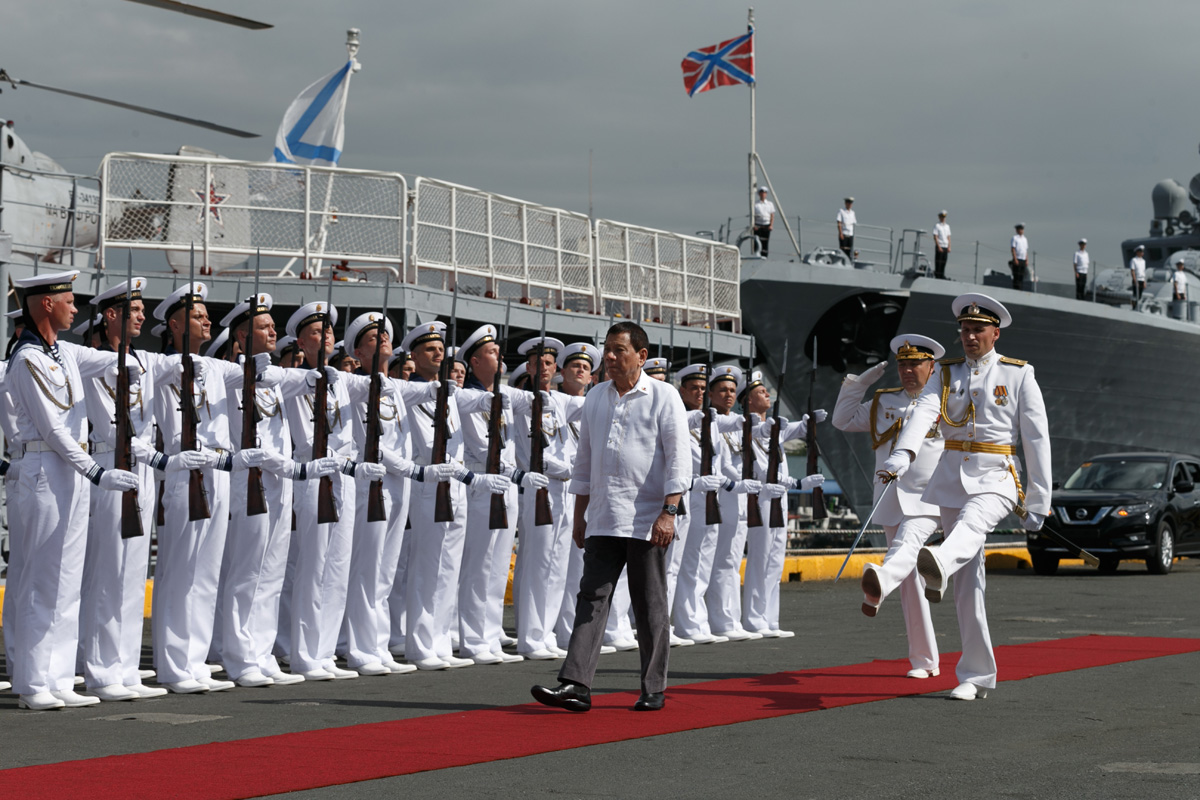
President Rodrigo Duterte inspecting the Admiral Panteleyev as it delivers aid to the Philippine government in the wake of the Battle of Marawi.

She is a part of the Russian Pacific Ocean Fleet; she was deployed in 2009 as part of operations to combat piracy off the Somali coast. Ship also participated at RIMPAC 2012.

From October 20 to October 26, 2017, Admiral Panteleyev visited Manila along with Udaloy-class destroyer Admiral Vinogradov and Boris Chilikin-class fleet oiler Boris Butoma. Admiral Panteleyev carried over 5,000 Kalashnikov AKM rifles, 5000 SSh-68 steel helmets, 20 Ural-4320 utility trucks, and over a million rounds of 7.62×39mm as part of the Russian government's assistance to the Philippines during the Battle of Marawi. President Rodrigo Duterte visited the ship alongside AFP, DFA, and Russian Embassy officials on October 25, 2017, to inspect the donated material .

In March 2022, the destroyer, accompanied by the tanker Izhora, was reported on exercises in the East China Sea.

Between 3 and 10 June 2022, Admiral Panteleyev, along with corvettes Gromkiy, Sovershennyy, Aldar Tsydenzhapov and intelligence ship Marshal Krylov, took part in naval exercises in the Pacific Ocean. More than 40 warships and support vessels, as well as around 20 aircraft, were involved in the exercises.

On 25 November 2022, she was at sea conducting anti-submarine exercises along with a diesel-electric submarine.

=== 2023 ===
On 27 October 2023, Admiral Panteleyev and Admiral Tributs departed Indonesia after a friendly visit. In November, it also took part in Indra Navy exercise with Indian Navy.

=== 2024 ===
In late 2024, the destroyer was reported participating in joint exercises with the Chinese Navy.

=== 2026 ===
The destroyer was reported active in the Sea of Japan as of mid-2026.
