= Furke (radar) =

Radar system

P5-27 "Furke"
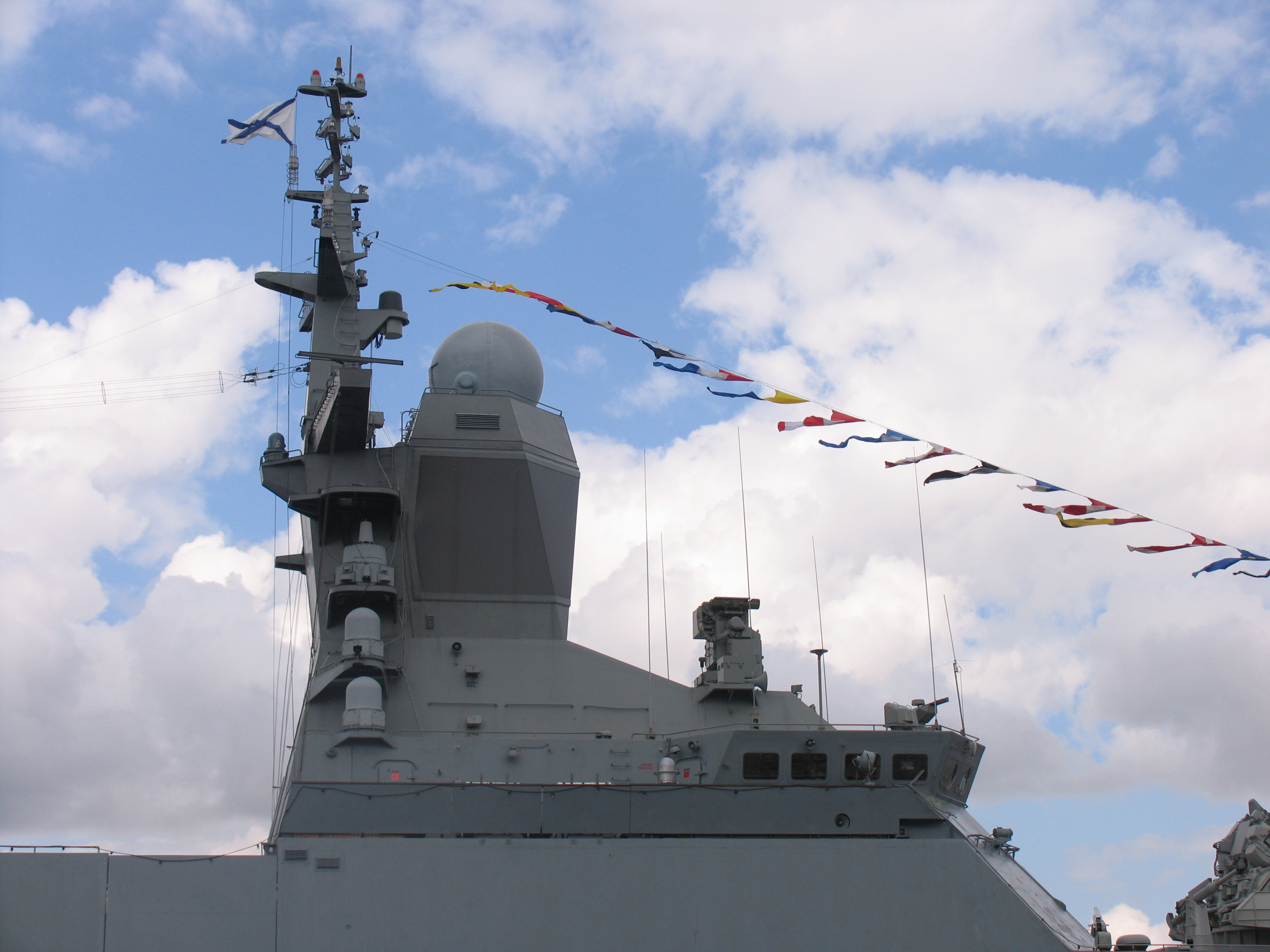
- "Furke" on Steregushchiy corvette (under the top radome)
- Country of origin: Russian Federation
- Introduced: 2006
- Type: 3D air and surface search radar
- Frequency: E-band
- Range: 60–150 km
- Altitude: 15–20 km
- Azimuth: 0–360°
- Elevation: 0–80°
- Power: 7.5-25 kW

The 5P-27 "Furke" is a ship-based 3D air and surface search radar system designed and produced by the VNIIRT (as a part of Almaz-Antey) for the Russian Navy. It is designed for detection, tracking, identification and targeting of air and sea vehicles, including low-flying aircraft and sea-skimming cruise missiles. The radar incorporates a semi-active phased array, digital signal processing, mechanical azimuth scanning (30 rpm), electronic elevation scanning and is able to operate in any weather conditions.

The "Furke" is used on Steregushchiy-class corvettes, and is a ship-based variant of the 1РС1-1Е radar of Pantsir-S1 air defense complexes.

== Variants ==
Variants of Furke-E (export version)
Specification	Furke-E variant 1	Furke-E variant 2	Furke-E variant 3
Frequency	E-band		
Non-combat mode
Range, km	60	150	60
Azimuth view, °	360	360	360
Elevation view, °	6	4	15
Detection range for surface target trajectory	0,95–1,4 of radio horizon (depends on RW propagation conditions)		
Detection range for air target with RCS of 1 m^{2}, km	60	120	52; 60
Combat mode
Range, km	40	100	60
Azimuth view, °	360	360	360
Elevation view, °	60	80	30
Altitude view, km	15	20	–
Detection range for air target with RCS of 1 m^{2}, km	30	72	52
Detection range for AShM with RCS of 0,02 m^{2} and 5 m flight altitude; 21 m antenna height; km	10	12–14	12
Suppression of stationary objects' reflections, dB	50–55	50–55	50–55
Сoordinates measurement accuracy – Range, m	50	50	50
– Azimuth	4–6	4–6	3–4
– Elevation	8–9	5–7	–
Resolution – Range, m	150–200	150–200	150–200
– Azimuth, °	3,2	3,2	2,0
Silmultaneously tracked targets	100	200	50
Energy consumption, kW	8	25	7,5
Weight, kg	1100	2450	860
MTBF, hr	850	850	850
