= S-350 missile system =

S-350 Vityaz
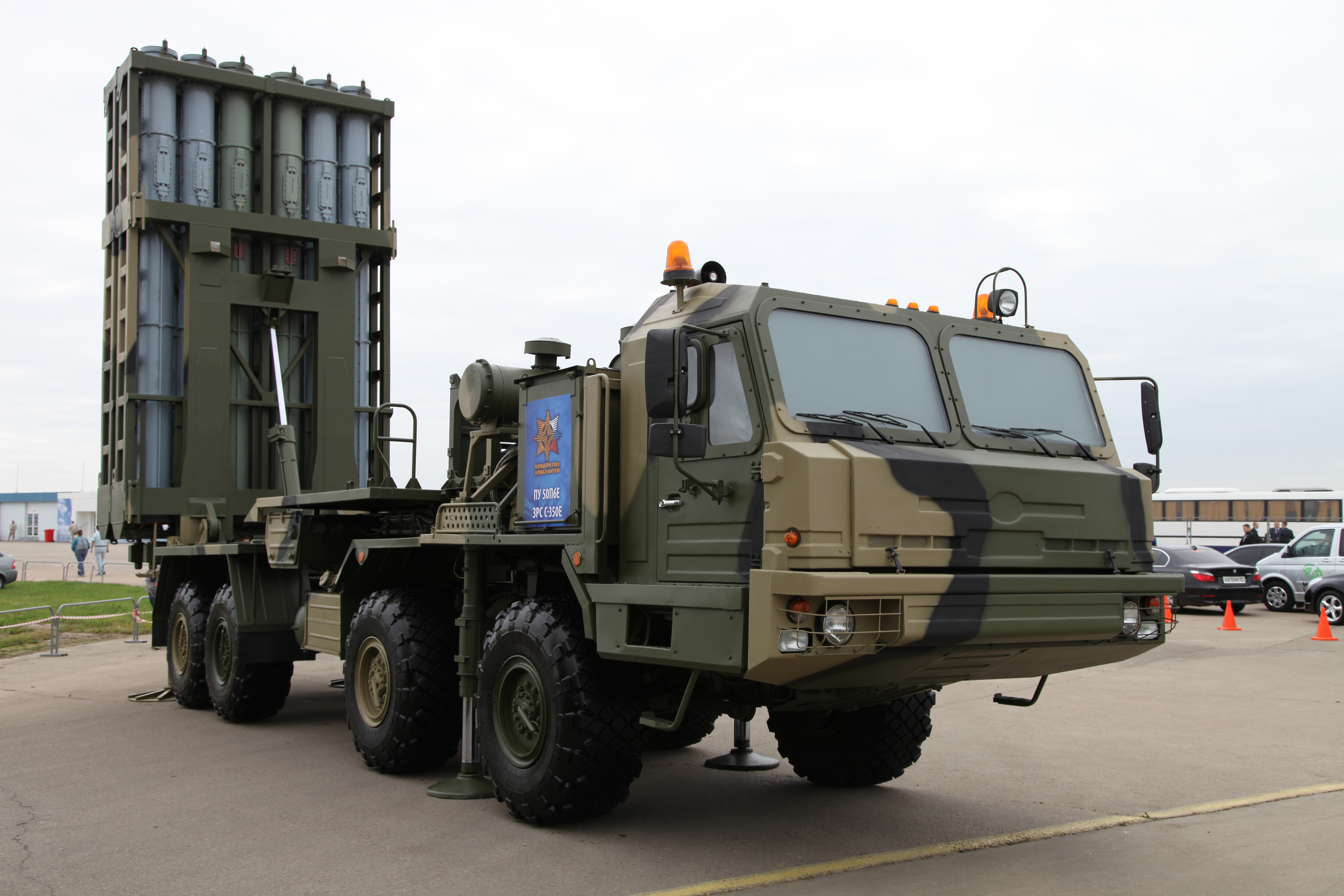
- 50P6E transporter erector launcher
- Type: Medium-range SAM system
- Place of origin: Russia

Service history
- In service: Since 2019
- Used by: Russia, Algeria
- Wars: Syrian civil war; Russo-Ukrainian War; Russo-Ukrainian war (2022–present)

Production history
- Designer: Almaz-Antey GSKB Almaz-Antey (lead designer) MKB Fakel (missile designer) Agency for Defense Development
- Manufacturer: Northwest Regional Center of Almaz-Antey (GOZ, ZRTO)
- Produced: 2020

Specifications
- Operational range: 1.5 - 120 km (against aircraft); 1.5 – 30 km (against ballistic missiles)

The S-350 Vityaz (Russian: C-350 Витязь) with NATO reporting name ‘’SA-28’’ is a Russian medium-range surface-to-air missile system developed by GSKB Almaz-Antey. Its purpose is to replace the S-300PS. The system design traces its roots from the joint South Korean-Russian M-SAM project, and mainly uses the 9M96 missile which is also used on the S-400 missile system.

== Development ==
The first studies that would eventually become the S-350 started in 1999. Development began in earnest only in 2007. Almaz-Antey was able to leverage the experience gained while working on the joint development of the M-SAM with South Korea. Around 2011, development slowed down, probably due to failed missile tests. The S-350 was unveiled in 2013, and presented at that year's MAKS airshow. Initial plans called for the system's test phase to end in the autumn of 2013, and for the delivery of around 30 systems by 2020. However, the first deliveries of the S-350 only took place in 2019, and it only entered service in February 2020.

== Design ==
The S-350 Vityaz air defense system consists of several vehicles :

- 1–2 50N6A multifunctional passively electronically scanned array radar stations. 360° coverage for early detection, target illumination and missile guidance.
- 1 50K6A command post, fully autonomous combat work with interaction with other remote systems.
- 4–8 50P6 launchers (12 9M96 missiles).
  - 9M96/9M96E(E2) guided missiles; passive guidance and other missiles with active homing guidance. 12–120 km (7.5–74.6 mi) range, aerodynamic control surfaces and thrust vectoring.
  - 9M100 guided missiles; 10–15 km (6.2–9.3 mi) range; infrared passive homing; aerodynamic control surfaces and thrust vectoring; maximum maneuver 60 G-20 surfaces. 9M100 can be quad packed in the naval version.

Basic performance characteristics of the S-350 :

- Maximum number of simultaneously engaged targets :
  - Aerodynamic – 16
  - Ballistic – 12
- Maximum number of simultaneously induced missiles – 32
- Affected area for aerodynamic targets :
  - Range – 1.5–120 km (0.93–74.56 mi)
  - Height – 10 m-30 km (98,000 ft)
- Affected area of ballistic targets :
  - Range – 1.5–30 km (0.93–18.64 mi)
  - Height – 2–25 km (6,600–82,000 ft)
- Deployment time – 5 minutes

All vehicles are based on a Bryansky Avtomobilny Zavod chassis (BAZ-6909 & BAZ-69092). The naval version with 9M96E guided missile which passed state tests in 2018 is the Redut.

The export variant of the Redut was named Resurs (Resource).

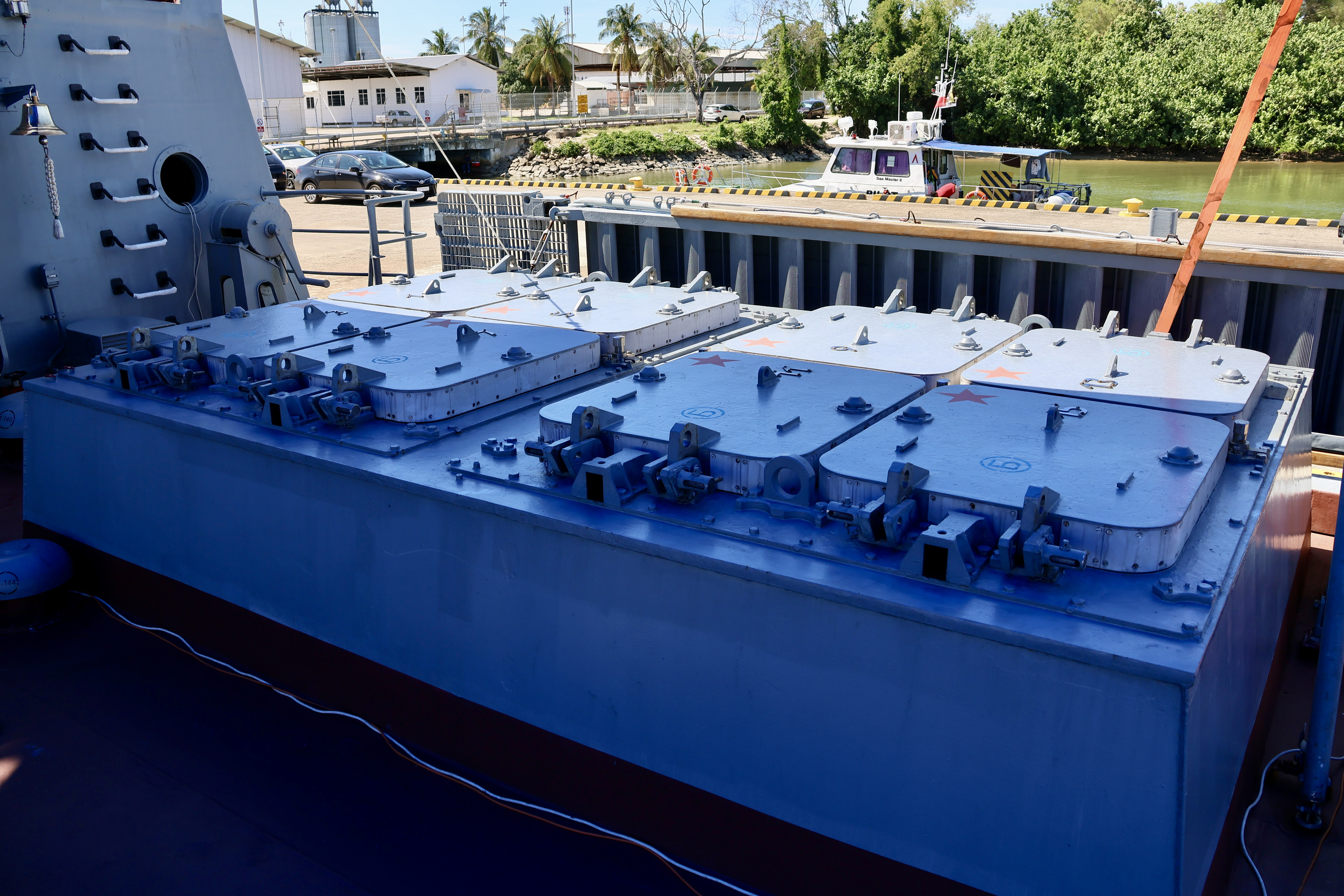
The Redut/S-350 VLS system on the Russian corvette Gremyaschiy

=== Missiles ===
	9M96E2	9M96E	9M100
Minimum range	1 km	1 km	_
Maximum range	120 km	40 km	10–15 km
Minimum altitude	5 m	5 m	_
Maximum altitude	30 km (98,000 ft)	20 km (66,000 ft)	8 km (26,000 ft)
Speed	1800 m/s	_	1000 m/s
Weight	420 kg (930 lb)	333 kg (734 lb)	140 kg (310 lb)
Length	5.65 m (18.5 ft)	4.75 m (15.6 ft)	2.5 m (8.2 ft)
Diameter	240 mm (9.4 in)	240 mm (9.4 in)	125 mm (4.9 in)
Warhead weight	24 kg (53 lb)	24 kg (53 lb)	14.5 kg (32 lb)

== Deployment ==
In September 2017, the S-350 missile system was reportedly deployed in the town of Masyaf in Hama province, Syria, delivered from Russia via the Tartus port.

The first launches, made on March 26, 2019, were positive and the air defense missile system successfully passed state tests.

In late December 2019, at Kapustin Yar, the S-350 was officially handed over to the Russian Ministry of Defence. The handover involved tracking of aerodynamic targets.

In February 2020, the S-350 Vityaz was officially commissioned into the service of the old Russian Aerospace Defence Forces now merged in to the new Russian Aerospace Forces as the new missile system had been delivered to Zhukov Air and Space Defense Academy to train crews for the equipment.

The Almaz-Antey Group and the Defense Ministry of Russia signed contracts for the delivery of four sets of S-350 "Vityaz" and three regiments of S-400 "Triumf" in June 2020. Deliveries started in 2021.

The S-350 is used in the Russian invasion of Ukraine.

=== Ship classes that use the Redut Naval Air Defense System ===
- Steregushchiy-class corvette
- Gremyashchiy-class corvette
- Project 20386 corvette
- Admiral Gorshkov-class frigate

== Operators ==
Russia

- Russian Aerospace Forces

Algeria

- Territorial Air Defence Forces

== Gallery ==
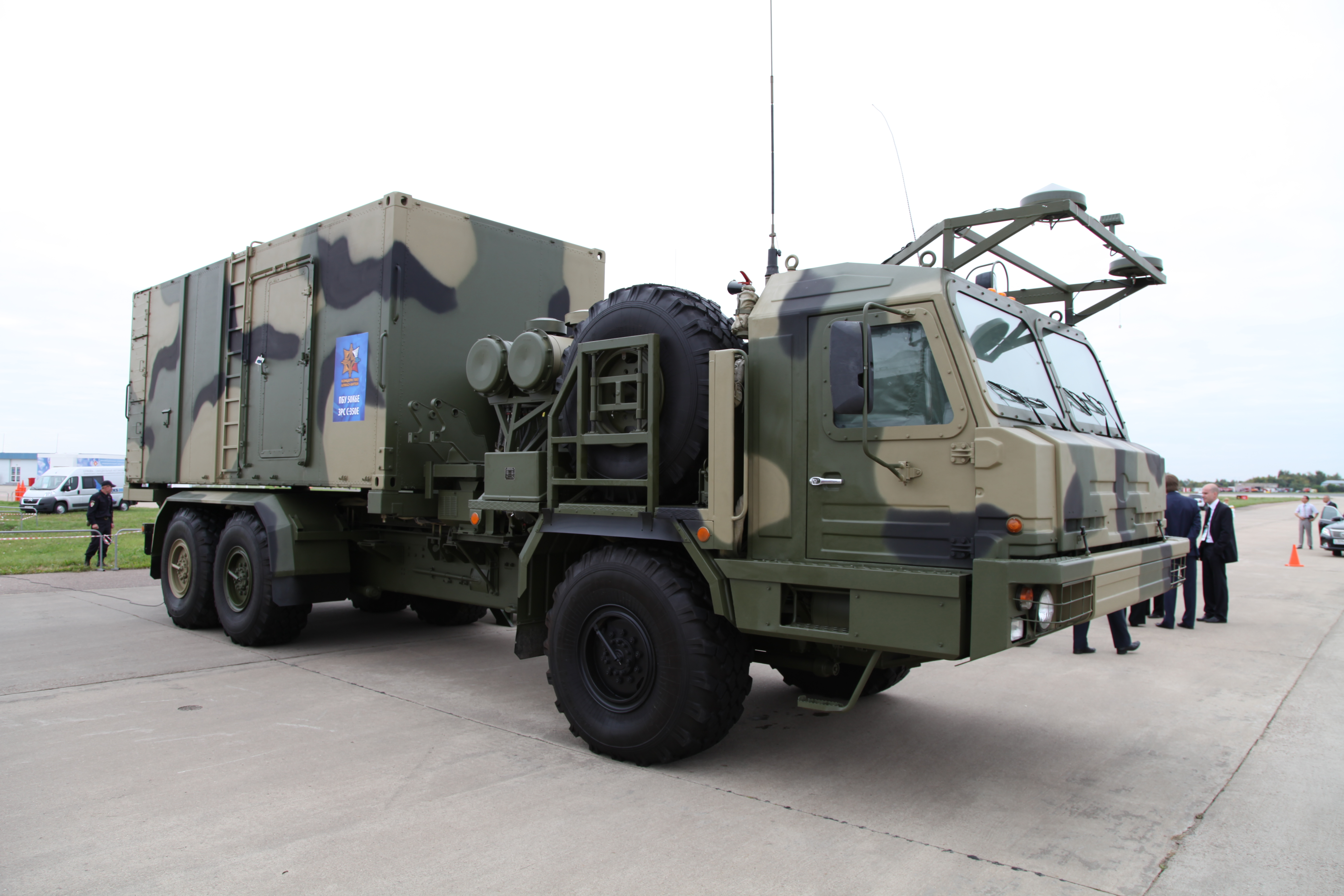
50K6E command post

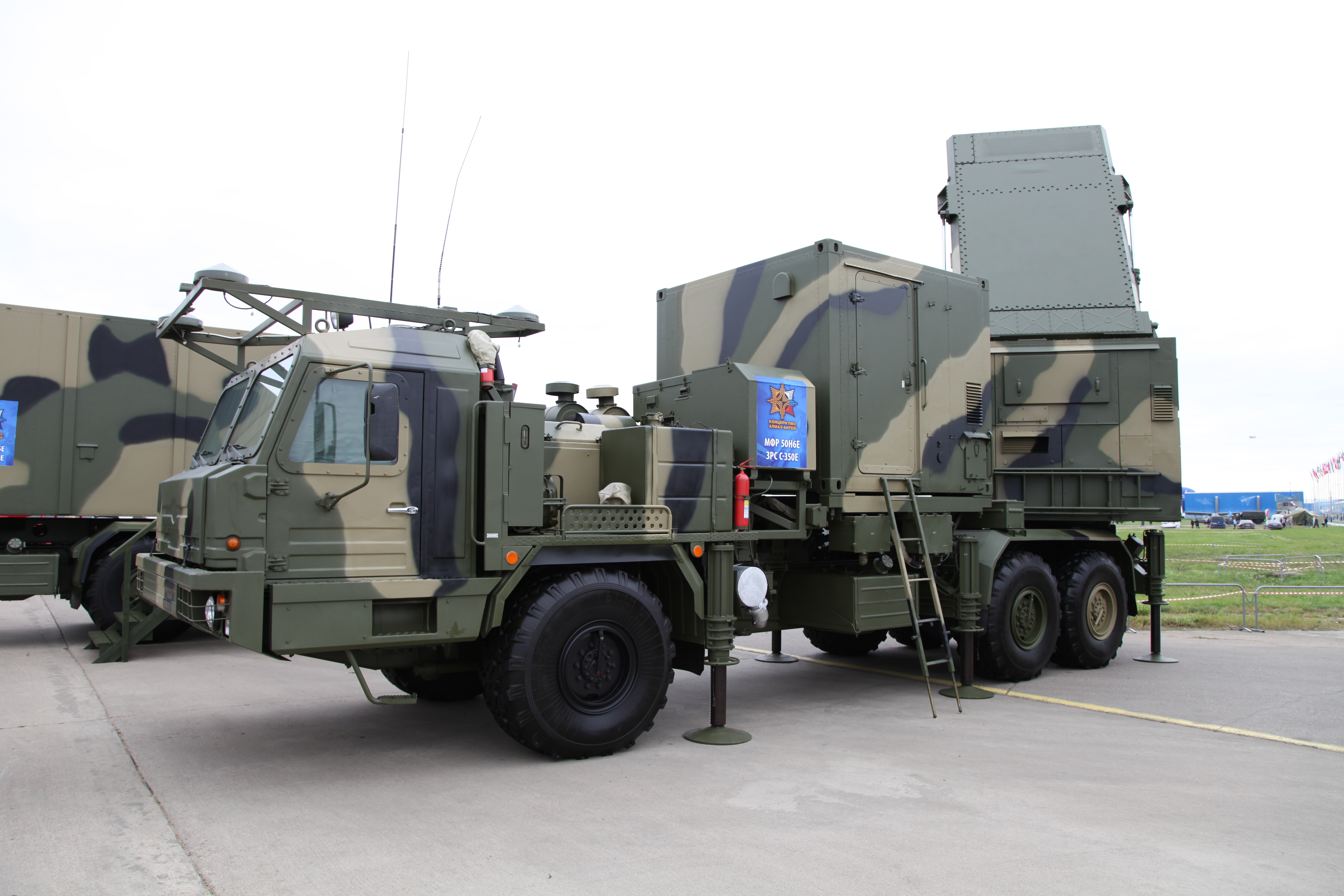
50N6E multifunctional radar

== See also ==
- Pantsir missile system – (Russia)
- 42S6 Morfey – (Russia)
- S-300 missile system – (Soviet Union, Russia)
- S-300VM missile system – (Russia)
- S-400 missile system – (Soviet Union, Russia)
- S-500 missile system – (Russia)
- M-SAM – (South Korea)
- Barak 8 – (India, Israel)
- MIM-104 Patriot – (United States)
