= Shaposhnikov =

Shaposhnikov may refer to

- Shaposhnikov (surname)
- Shaposhnikov, Belgorod Oblast, a rural locality in Russia
- 1902 Shaposhnikov, an asteroid
- Russian destroyer Marshal Shaposhnikov (BPK 543), am Udaloy-class destroyer of the Russian Navy
