= Ildar Akhmerov =

Russian naval officer (born 1965)

Ildar Ferdinandovich Akhmerov
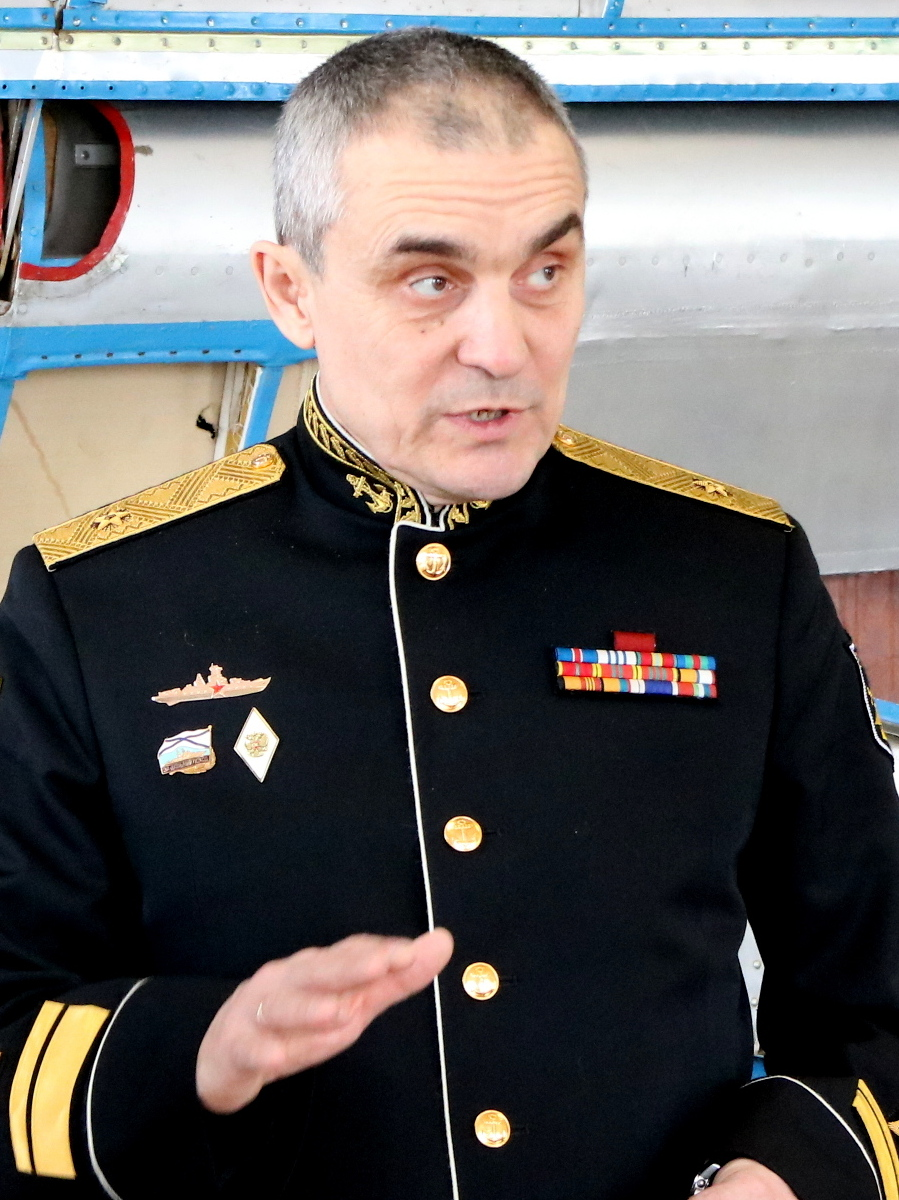
- Akhmerov in 2021
- Born: 7 August 1965 (age 61); Kazan, Tatar ASSR, Russian SFSR, Soviet Union
- Allegiance: USSR; Russia
- Branch: Soviet Navy; Russian Navy
- Service years: 1982–present
- Rank: Vice-Admiral
- Commands: Admiral Vinogradov; 44th Anti-Submarine Ship Brigade; Caspian Flotilla
- Awards: Order "For Merit to the Fatherland" Fourth Class; Order of Military Merit; Order of Naval Merit

Ildar Ferdinandovich Akhmerov (Russian: Ильдар Фердинандович Ахмеров; born 7 August 1965) is an officer of the Russian Navy. He currently holds the rank of Vice-Admiral, and is a deputy commander in chief of the Black Sea Fleet since 2024.

== Biography ==
Akhmerov was born on 7 August 1965 in Kazan, in what was then the Tatar Autonomous Soviet Socialist Republic, Russian Soviet Federative Socialist Republic, in the Soviet Union. He entered the Soviet Navy, studying at the Pacific Higher Naval School in Vladivostok from 1982 to 1987, when he graduated from the faculty of radio engineering. He was assigned to serve as a group commander of the combat unit of the Krivak-class frigate Storozhevoy between 1987 and 1994, followed by the post of commander of the radiotechnical combat unit of the Udaloy-class destroyer Admiral Tributs from 1994 until 1997, and then senior assistant to the commander of the Admiral Panteleyev between 1997 and 2001. He undertook further studies at the Kuznetsov Naval Academy between 2001 and 2003, and was then appointed commander of the Admiral Vinogradov. This was followed by a posting as chief of staff until 7 June 2008, and then commander of the Pacific Fleet's anti-submarine ship unit until 2011.

Akhmerov was the senior officer during the cruise of a detachment of warships of the Pacific Fleet into the Indian Ocean in 2010, including the Marshal Shaposhnikov. In May 2010 the detachment responded to the hijacking of the Russian-flagged tanker MV Moscow University by Somali pirates, successfully releasing the ship after a naval assault. Akhmerov went on to serve as deputy commander of the Primorskaya Flotilla between 2011 and 2012, before enrolling at the Military Academy of the General Staff. He graduated in 2013, and was appointed chief of staff, and subsequently from 2014 commander, of the Caspian Flotilla. He served in this role until May 2015, when he was appointed as chief of staff and first deputy commander of the Northern Fleet's Kola Flotilla, being promoted to rear-admiral on 18 February 2021. In 2023 Akhmerov was transferred to serve as deputy commander of the Black Sea Fleet, being advanced in 2024 to the position of chief of staff and first deputy commander. On 9 December 2024, he was promoted to the rank of vice-admiral.

In late June 2025, Akhmerov was reported dead after an attack launched by Ukraine. Various sources such as Ukrainian internet news outlets and Russian military bloggers on Telegram reported the incident. However, both Ukrainian and Russian officials did not comment on the status of the admiral.

== Honours and awards ==
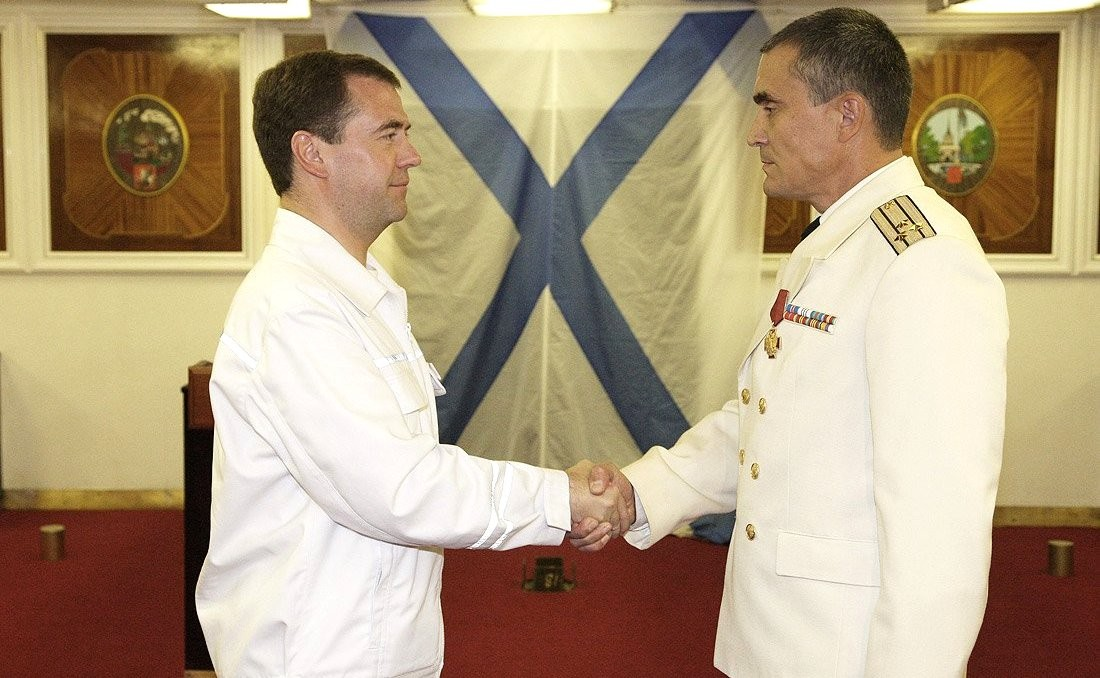
Russian President Dmitry Medvedev presentated Order "For Merit to the Fatherland", 4th class to Ildar Akhmerov in Vladivostok, 4 July 2010

Over his career Akhmerov has received the Order "For Merit to the Fatherland" Fourth Class, the Order of Military Merit, the Order of Naval Merit, and various other medals.

Military offices
Preceded by Sergei Alyokminsky	Commander of the Caspian Flotilla; 2014–2015	Succeeded by Igor Osipov
