= Vladimir Tributs =

Soviet admiral (1900–1977)

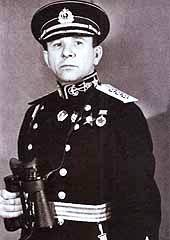
- Born: July 28, 1900; St. Petersburg, Russian Empire
- Died: August 30, 1977 (aged 77); Moscow, Russian SFSR, Soviet Union
- Burial place: Novodevichy Cemetery
- Military career
- Allegiance: Soviet Russia (1918–1922); Soviet Union (1922–1961)
- Branch: Soviet Navy
- Service years: 1918–1961
- Rank: Admiral
- Commands: Baltic Fleet
- Conflicts: Russian Civil War; World War II
- Awards: Order of Lenin - twice Order of the October Revolution; Order of Ushakov - twice Order of the Red Banner - four times Order of Nakhimov; Order of the Red Star

Vladimir Filippovich Tributs (Russian: Влади́мир Фили́ппович Три́буц; 28 July [O.S. 15 July] 1900 – August 30, 1977) was a Soviet naval commander and admiral.

== Life and career ==
Born in 1900 in Saint Petersburg, Tributs joined the Navy in 1918 and during the Russian Civil War participated in combat actions on the Volga and in the Caspian. He graduated and received his commission from M.V. Frunze Higher Naval School in 1926 and graduated from the Naval Academy in 1932. From 1932 to 1936 he served on ships of the Baltic Fleet (the battleships Parizhskaya Kommuna and Marat) and commanded the destroyer Yakov Sverdlov. From February 1938 to April 1939 Tributs served as the Chief of Staff of the Baltic Fleet and from April 1939 to 1947 he commanded it.

As war approached, Tributs observed the growing evidence of hostile German activity with apprehension; in the summer of 1940, he "advanced Baltic Fleet headquarters from its historic seat at the Kronstadt fortress in Leningrad to the port of Tallinn, two hundred miles to the west" despite his worries about security problems and the difficulty of constructing a new base. On June 19 he put the Baltic Fleet up to "Readiness No. 2" state, which meant fueling the ships and putting their crews on alert, and late on the evening of June 21 (the eve of the German invasion) he moved to "Readiness No. 1" state, which was fully operational. On August 17, the defense of Leningrad was placed in his hands.

A leading navy commander during the Siege of Leningrad, Tributs led the Soviet evacuation of Tallinn, organized military operations in defense of the ports of Kronstadt and Oranienbaum during 1941-1943, and arranged counterattacks by naval aircraft of the Baltic Fleet defending Leningrad from aerial bombing attacks. His active involvement in the defense of Leningrad helped to save the city from still more destruction, but failed to save the suburban palaces of the Tsars, such as the Peterhof Palace, from destruction by the Nazis.

From March 1946 until May 1947 he commanded the 8th Fleet (Baltic Fleet). On May 28, 1947 he was made Deputy Chief of the troops of the Far East for the Navy. In June 1948, he was recalled to Moscow. In September 1948 - January 1949 - The head of the military and naval schools and senior naval officer in Leningrad. In March 1949 - December 1951 - Head of the Hydrographic Department of the Navy of the USSR. In June and September 1948 and January–March 1949, he remained at the disposal of the Commander in Chief.

Tributs retired in February 1961 and, turning to military history after his retirement, he produced over 50 works including military histories of the Baltic Fleet and its operations during the Second World War.

The Udaloy-class destroyer Admiral Tributs is named after him.

== Honours and awards ==
- Two Orders of Lenin
- Order of the Red Banner, four times
- Order of Ushakov, 1st class, twice
- Order of Nakhimov, 1st class
- Order of the October Revolution
- Order of the Red Star
- Commander of the Legion of Merit (United States)
- Cross of Grunwald, 1st class (Poland)
- Jubilee Medal "In Commemoration of the 100th Anniversary since the Birth of Vladimir Il'ich Lenin"
- Medal "For the Defence of Leningrad"
- Medal "For the Capture of Königsberg"
- Medal "For the Victory over Germany in the Great Patriotic War 1941–1945"
- Jubilee Medal "Twenty Years of Victory in the Great Patriotic War 1941-1945"
- Jubilee Medal "Thirty Years of Victory in the Great Patriotic War 1941-1945"
- Jubilee Medal "XX Years of the Workers' and Peasants' Red Army"
- Jubilee Medal "30 Years of the Soviet Army and Navy"
- Jubilee Medal "40 Years of the Armed Forces of the USSR"
- Jubilee Medal "50 Years of the Armed Forces of the USSR"

== Sources ==
- Словарь Биографический Морской, St. Petersburg, LOGOS, 2001, ISBN 5-87288-128-2.

== Works ==
- Балтийцы наступают (The Sailors of the Baltic Fleet are Advancing). Kaliningrad, 1968.
- Балтийцы вступают в бой (The Sailors of the Baltic Fleet Join the Battle). Kaliningrad, 1972.
- Балтийцы сражаются (The Sailors of the Baltic Fleet Fight). Kaliningrad, 1975.
