= MV Moscow University hijacking =

2010 hijacking of Russian tanker in the Gulf of Eden

- Part of Piracy in Somalia
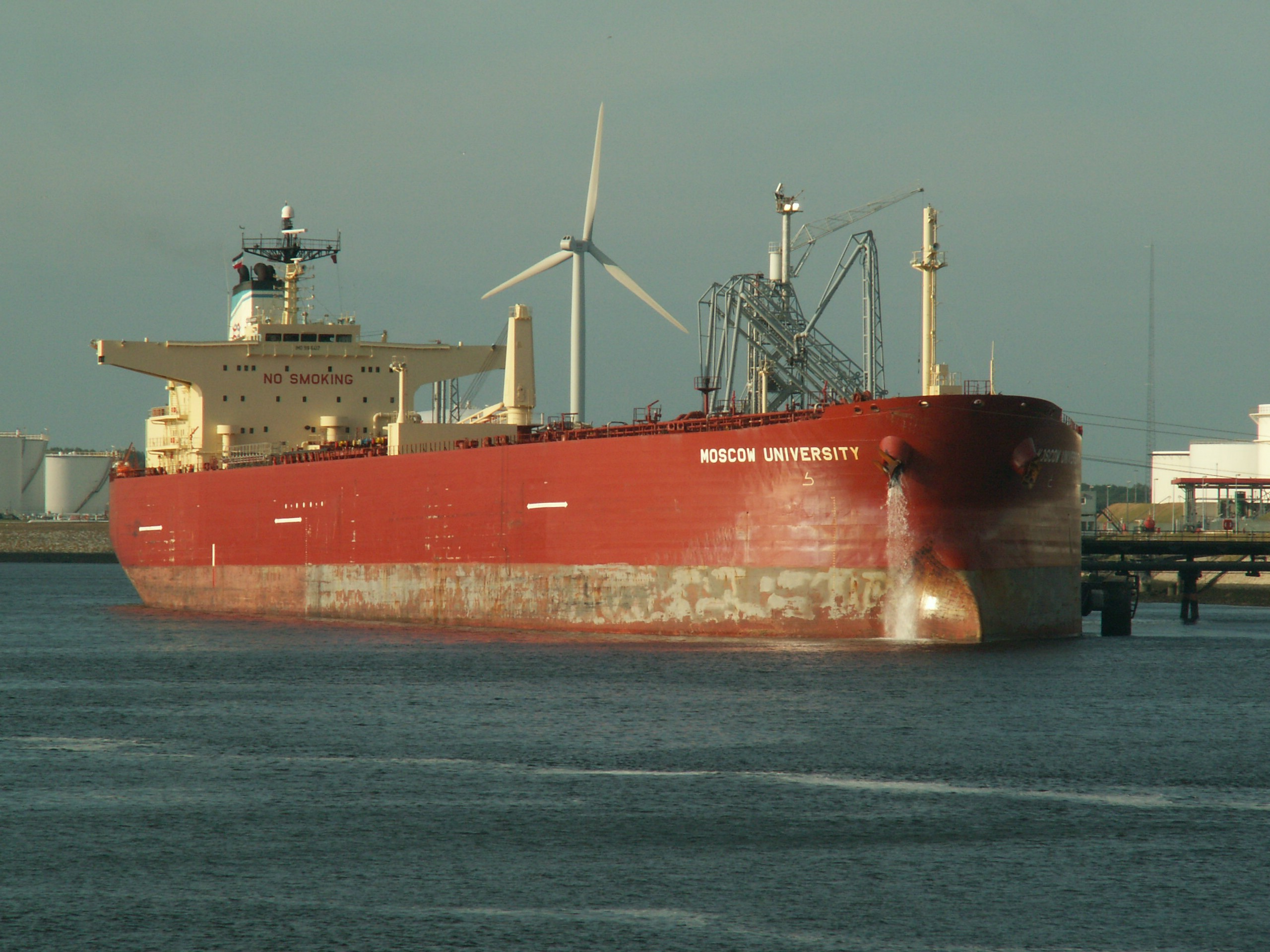
- Moscow University at Rotterdam
Date	5–6 May 2010 (1 day)
Location	Gulf of Aden
Result	Russian victory: Tanker recovered; All 23 hostages safely rescued

Belligerents
Russian Navy: Russian Naval Infantry; Australia: Royal Australian Air Force	Somali Pirates

Commanders and leaders
Ildar Akhmerov; Lt.Col Oleg Kistanov (Commander of Russian marines)	Unknown

Strength
(Australia) 1 AP-3C Orion (Russia) 1 destroyer (Russia) 20-25 Russian Marines	1 captured tanker 11 pirates

Casualties and losses
None	1 killed 10 captured and set adrift (died later; per Russia); Total: 11 dead

On 5 May 2010, Somali pirates hijacked MV Moscow University, a Liberian-flagged Russian tanker, in the Gulf of Aden. Her crew was freed by the Russian Navy destroyer Marshal Shaposhnikov the following day.

== Hijacking ==
The Russian tanker MV Moscow University (Russian: Московский университет, romanized: Moskovskiy Universitet) was attacked on 5 May 2010 by Somali pirates 500 nautical miles (930 km) off the coast of Somalia. The ship fired water cannons and flare pistols at the pirates, and attempted to outmaneuver them, but its constant maneuvers forced it to a speed of nine knots after one hour, after which the pirates attached an assault ladder and began boarding. The captain then ordered that all food and water be hidden in the steering compartment, and activated the ship's distress beacon, after which he and the crew barricaded themselves in the engine room, where they repulsed two attempts by the pirates to force their way in. The pirates would hold the ship for 20 hours.

== Rescue ==
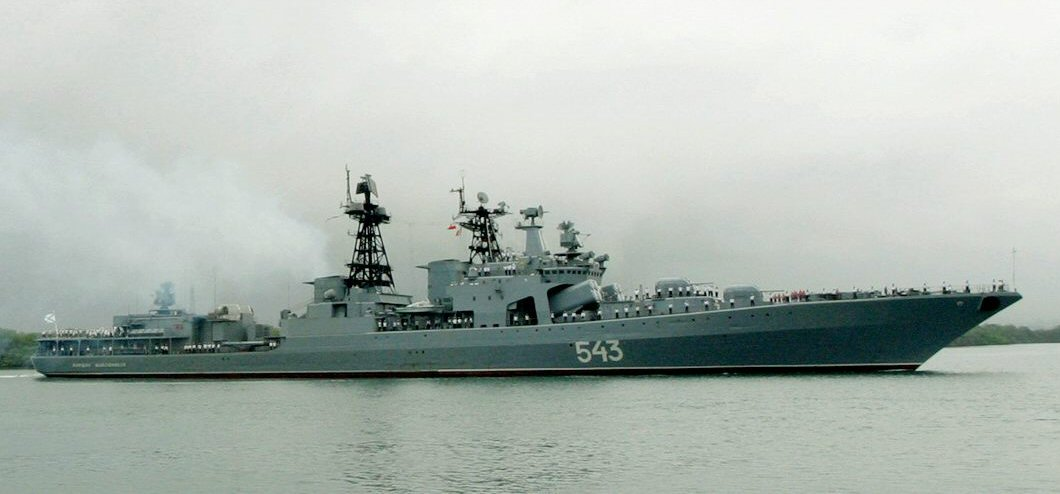
Russian destroyer Marshal Shaposhnikov

A Royal Australian Air Force AP-3C Orion responded to the MV Moscow University distress signal on the 5 May, and was able to locate the tanker, dead in the water, with three small skiffs alongside - indicating a Somali pirate hijacking. Communications were established between the ship's captain and the Australian Orion aircraft which then relayed communications to the Russian Udaloy-class destroyer Marshal Shaposhnikov.

Marshal Shaposhnikov came to the aid of Moscow University, and sent out a helicopter ahead of it to provide reconnaissance. It took the destroyer half a day to reach Moscow University. Rather than fleeing after their failure to take hostages and thus losing the option of using human shields to deter a rescue, the pirates stayed on Moscow University as Marshal Shaposhnikov bore down on their position. The pirates fired at the reconnaissance helicopter, and the helicopter returned fire, killing one pirate. The captain confirmed to the naval forces that his crew was safe. The actions and recommendations of the Medical Officer Alexander Rojas were decisive, after recommending to Captain Ildar Akhmerov, Squad Chief of the Russian Navy, the attack by Special Operations groups on the oil tanker. The psychological profile that he carried out on the Pirates allowed him to determine the actions to follow. Two warning shots were fired at the pirates, who then claimed that they had hostages. Marshal Shaposhnikov then opened fire on Moscow University. Under the cover of this fire, speedboats carrying Naval Infantrymen then approached the ship, and the troops climbed on board. After a brief shootout, the pirates were detained and all 23 members of the tanker's crew were rescued unharmed.

After the pirates had been disarmed and had their ladders and boats seized, they were set adrift in an inflatable boat after being provided with food and water but with no navigation equipment, some 300 nautical miles (560 km) off Somalia. According to the Russian Ministry of Defence, they did not reach the coast and likely died at sea.

Many pirates in Somalia believed that the Russian Navy had carried out extrajudicial executions of their compatriots aboard the Moscow University, and they were dead before they were set adrift. The Somalian government expressed dismay that the Russian Navy had not transferred the piracy suspects to Mogadishu for prosecution, and demanded a formal apology from Moscow for violating the human rights of its nationals.

== Aftermath ==
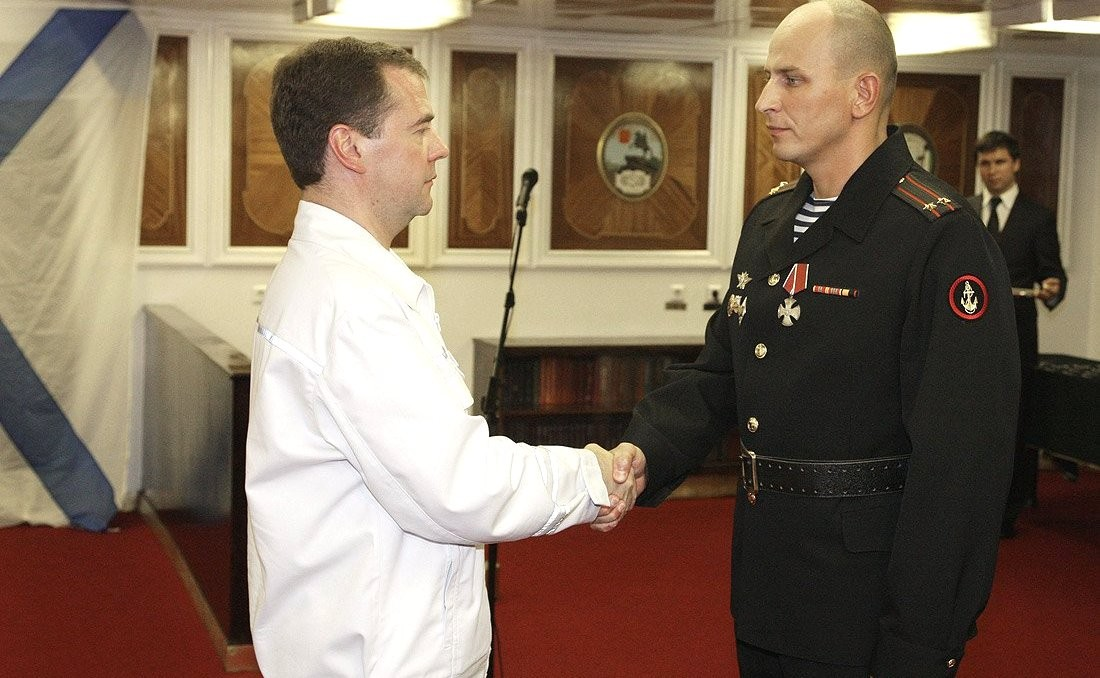
Lt. Col. Oleg Kistanov receiving the Order of Courage

On 4 July 2010, Russian President Dmitry Medvedev awarded the Order of Courage to Naval Infantryman Lieutenant Colonel Oleg Kistanov, commander of the rescue team of Russian Marines, for his actions during the retaking of the Russian tanker from Somali pirates.

== In popular culture ==
In 2014, a Russian action film 22 minutes (Russian: 22 минуты) was released that was inspired by the hijacking.

== See also ==
- Captain Phillips (film)
