= Shaposhnik =

Family name

Shaposhnik is a Russian-language occupational surname, literally meaning hatter,. Variants include Shaposhnyk (Ukrainian), Shapotshnick, Shapochnik, etc. Notable people with the surname include:

- Rabbi Joseph Shapotshnick (1882–1937), Jewish social activist in Great Britain
- Oleksandr Shaposhnyk (born 1983), Ukrainian Olympic taekwondo practitioner
- Boris Shaposhnik (1902—1985), Soviet automotive designer
- Mykola Shaposhnyk (1934-2009), Ukrainian writer and Cossack activist

== See also ==
- Shaposhnikov (surname)
