= Russian cruiser Varyag (1983) =

Slava-class guided missile cruiser

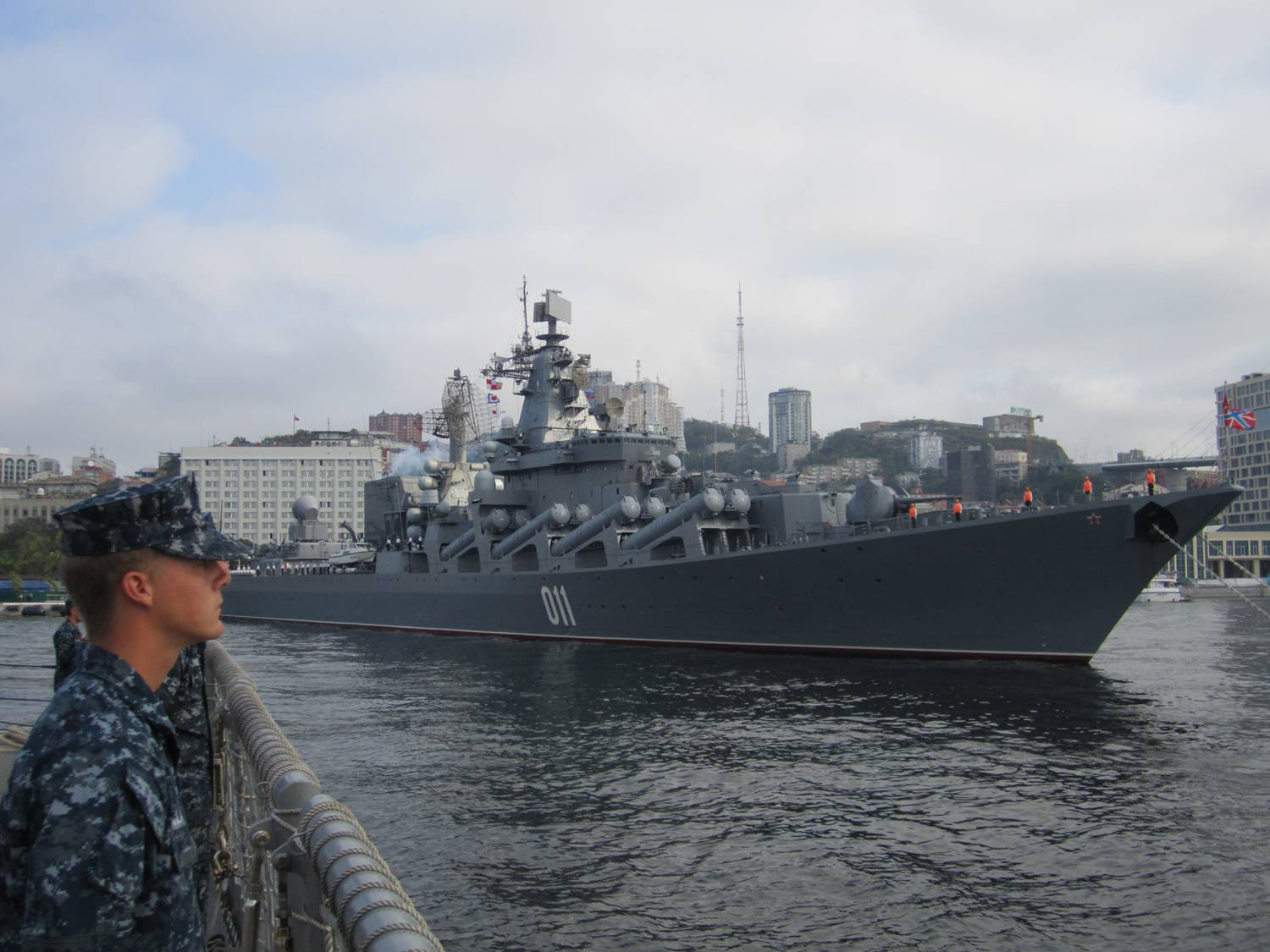
- Varyag in Vladivostok greeting the crew of USS Vandegrift

History

Russia
- Name: Varyag (ex-Chervona Ukraina)
- Namesake: Viking or Varangians
- Builder: 61 Kommunara Shipbuilding Plant (SY 445), Mykolaiv
- Laid down: 31 July 1979
- Launched: 28 August 1983
- Commissioned: 16 October 1989
- Status: In active service
- Notes: Flagship of the Pacific Fleet

General characteristics
- Class & type: Slava-class cruiser
- Displacement: 11,490 tons
- Length: 186.4 m (611.5 ft)
- Beam: 20.8 m (68.2 ft)
- Draft: 8.4 m (27.6 ft)
- Propulsion: 4 COGOG gas turbines, 2 shafts 121,000 shp
- Speed: 32 knots (59 km/h; 37 mph)
- Range: 10,000 nautical miles (19,000 km; 12,000 mi) at 16 knots (30 km/h; 18 mph)
- Complement: 480
- Sensors & processing systems: Voskhod MR-800 (Top Pair) 3D search radar; Fregat MR-710 (Top Steer) 3D search radar; Palm Frond navigation radar; Pop group SA-N-4 fire control radar; Top Dome SA-N-6 fire control radar; Bass Tilt AK-630 CIWS System fire control radar; Bull horn MF hull mounted sonar
- Electronic warfare & decoys: Rum Tub and Side Globe EW antennas; 2 × PK-2 DL (140 mm chaff / flare)
- Armament: 16 (8 × 2) P-1000 Vulkan (SS-N-12 Sandbox) anti-ship missiles; 8 × 8 (64) S-300F Fort (SA-N-6 Grumble) long-range surface-to-air missiles; 2 × 20 (40) OSA-MA (SA-N-4 Gecko) SR SAM; 1 × twin AK-130 130 mm/L70 dual purpose guns; 6 × AK-630 close-in weapons systems; 2 × RBU-6000 anti-submarine mortars; 10 × (2 quin) 533 mm torpedo tubes
- Armor: Splinter plating
- Aircraft carried: 1 Ka-25 or Ka-27 Helicopter

Russian cruiser Varyag (Russian: Варяг, lit. 'Varangian'), formerly Chervona Ukraina ("Red Ukraine"), is the third ship of the Slava-class of guided missile cruisers built for the Soviet Navy now serving the Russian Navy.

== Description ==
Varyag is a Slava-class cruiser designed during the Soviet Union as a Raketnyy Kreyser or "anti-ship rocket cruiser (RKR)." The development started on 20 April 1972 as a stretched version of Kara-class cruiser with the P-500 Bazalt missiles. As there was nothing revolutionary about the design of the class, Western observers felt they were created as a less expensive conventionally powered alternative to the nuclear-powered Kirov-class battlecruisers.

The preliminary design started at the Northern Design Bureau in October 1972. The chief designer was director of the Northern Design Bureau Aleksandr Kuzmich Perkov (since 1979 Valentin Ivanovich Mutikhin) and the main observer from the Navy was Captain 2nd rank A. N. Blinov. The preliminary design was reviewed in December 1972 and approved on 21 August 1974.

The vessel has a standard displacement of 10,000 tonnes (10,000 long tons) and 12,700 t (12,500 long tons) at full load. Varyag measures 186.4 metres (611 ft 7 in) long with a beam of 20.8 m (68 ft 3 in) and a draught of 8.4 m (27 ft 7 in). The vessel is powered by a combined gas or gas (COGOG) system comprising four 23,300 kilowatts (31,250 shp) boost gas turbines and two 8,900 kW (12,000 shp) cruise gas turbines driving two shafts for a combined 93,000 kW (125,000 shp).

This gives the cruiser a maximum speed of 34 knots (63 km/h; 39 mph). It has a range of 9,000 nautical miles (17,000 km; 10,000 mi) at 15 knots (28 km/h; 17 mph). As built the cruiser had a complement of 505. This was later reduced to 476 including 62 officers.

Varyag is armed with sixteen P-1000 Vulkan (SS-N-12 Sandbox) anti-ship missiles (SSM) in two eight-missile launchers located amidships to either side of the superstructure. It is also equipped with 64 S-300F Fort (SA-N-6 Grumble) long-range surface-to-air missiles (SAM) in eight eight-missile launchers located aft of the funnel and forty OSA-M (SA-N-4 Gecko) SR SAMs in two twenty-round launchers located aft, to either side of the hangar.

Varyag is armed with twin-mounted AK-130 130 mm (5 in)/L70 dual purpose guns located forward and six AK-630 30 mm (1.2 in) close-in weapons systems with two located forward atop the superstructure and four located amidships to either side of the superstructure. For anti-submarine warfare (ASW), the cruiser mounts two RBU-6000 anti-submarine mortars, each with six barrels and ten 533 mm (21 in) torpedo tubes two quintuple launchers behind shutters near the stern.

The ship was equipped with MR-800 Voskhod/Top Pair 3-D long range air search and MR-700 Fregat/Top Steer air/surface search radar. For ASW, the cruisers is equipped with MG-332 Tigan-2T/Bull Nose hull-mounted LF and Platina/Horse Tail MF VDS sonar. Varyag mounts MR-184/Kite Screech fire control radar for the 130 mm guns, 3R41 Volna/Top Dome radar for SA-N-6 SAM control, MPZ-301 Baza/Pop Group radar for SA-N-4 SAM control and Argument/Front Door-C radar for SSM control and 3 Bass Tilt radars for the AK-630s.

The cruiser utilises the Punch Bowl satellite link for its weapon targeting systems. For electronic warfare, the ship is supplied with the Kol'cho suite with Gurzhor-A&B/Side Globe intercept and MR-404/Rum Tub jammers. The vessel mounts two PK2 chaff launchers. The single Top Dome radar only has a 180° arc and presents a blind spot forward for the SA-N-6 missiles.

The cruiser has a flight deck over the stern and a hangar. The cruiser can utilise either one Kamov Ka-25 or Kamov Ka-27 helicopter. The hangar is one-half deck below the flight deck and is reached via an inclined ramp. The helicopter is maneuvered using a chain-haul system. The helicopter can provide over-the-horizon targeting for Varyag's weapon systems.

== Construction and service ==
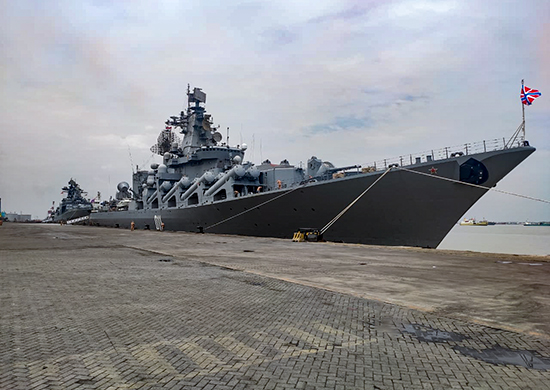
The cruiser Varyag during a visit to Indonesia on 14 December 2020

Laid down on 31 July 1979 at 61 Kommunara Shipbuilding Plant (Shipyard 445) in Mykolaiv as Chervona Ukraina ("Red Ukraine"), the vessel was launched in 28 August 1983, and commissioned on 16 October 1989. The warship joined the Pacific Fleet in 1990.

Between 5–8 June 1990, she paid a friendly visit to Kiel, Germany.

While in transit from Sevastopol to the new permanent base Petropavlovsk-Kamchatsky from 27 September to 5 November 1990, Chervona Ukraina and destroyer Bystry visited Vietnamese base Cam Ranh between 22 and 24 October.

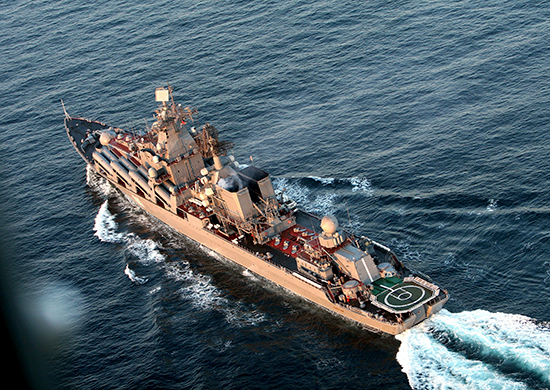
The cruiser Varyag in the Bay of Bengal on 5 December 2020

In 1991–1992 she was engaged in combat training, but in 1993–1994 she didn't go to sea, due to the lack of financing. The combat training resumed only in 1995.

The ship was renamed on 21 December 1995. After renaming in 1995, Varyag became part of the 36th Surface Ship Division at Vladivostok and has pennant number 011.

Between 9 and 13 February 1997 the ship paid a friendly visit to the South Korean port of Incheon, returning to Vladivostok on 19 February.

Between 2 and 6 October 1999, Varyag and destroyer Bystry visited Shanghai, China to commemorate the 50th anniversary of the founding of the state.

Between 10 and 15 October 2002, the ship visited the Japanese city of Yokosuka to honor the 50th anniversary of the Japanese Navy.

Between 10 and 15 February 2004, Varyag, destroyer Admiral Tributs and corvette Koreets visited the South Korean port of Incheon to commemorate 100th anniversary of the loss of the cruiser Varyag (1899), with commander of the Pacific Fleet Admiral Viktor Fyodorov on board.

Between September and December 2005 the ship led a ship detachment on visits to Visakhapatnam (India), Singapore, Jakarta (Indonesia), Sattahip (Thailand) and Haiphong (Vietnam).

Varyag re-entered service with the Pacific Fleet in May 2008 after an overhaul. During the refit, the main missile complex was upgraded from P-500 Bazalt to P-1000 Vulkan.

In April 2009 the ship paid a visit to the Chinese city of Qingdao to honor the 60th anniversary of the Chinese Navy. In October/November the same year, the ship also visited Singapore.

In June 2010, Varyag, under the command of Captain Eduard Moskalenko and with the Commander of the Northern Fleet Combined Forces Rear-Admiral Vladimir Lvovich Kasatonov embarked, made a port call to San Francisco. The visit, the first by a Russian Navy surface combatant in 147 years, featured a plaque dedication ceremony to commemorate six Russian Imperial Navy sailors who died fighting a fire in San Francisco in 1863. This visit also coincided with President Medvedev visiting Silicon Valley and he once again visited Varyag as he had in Singapore in 2009. Varyag also participated in training exercises with USS Bunker Hill.

From 8 to 11 November 2011 Varyag, accompanied by the tanker Irkut, made a port visit to Vancouver, British Columbia, to commemorate servicemen killed in armed conflicts. Varyag was escorted into Vancouver by the Royal Canadian Navy destroyer HMCS Algonquin, and Varyag's crew engaged in friendly sports matches with their Canadian counterparts from Algonquin.

In 2012, Varyag participated in the yearly exercise with the Chinese Navy off Qingdao.

In 2013 the ship departed on a long voyage to the Mediterranean Sea, visiting Trincomalee (Sri Lanka), Salalah (Oman) and Alexandria (Egypt).

In November 2014, Varyag led a deployment of four Russian naval vessels to international waters off Australia. The deployment was believed to be linked to the 2014 G-20 Brisbane summit and growing tensions between the two nations.

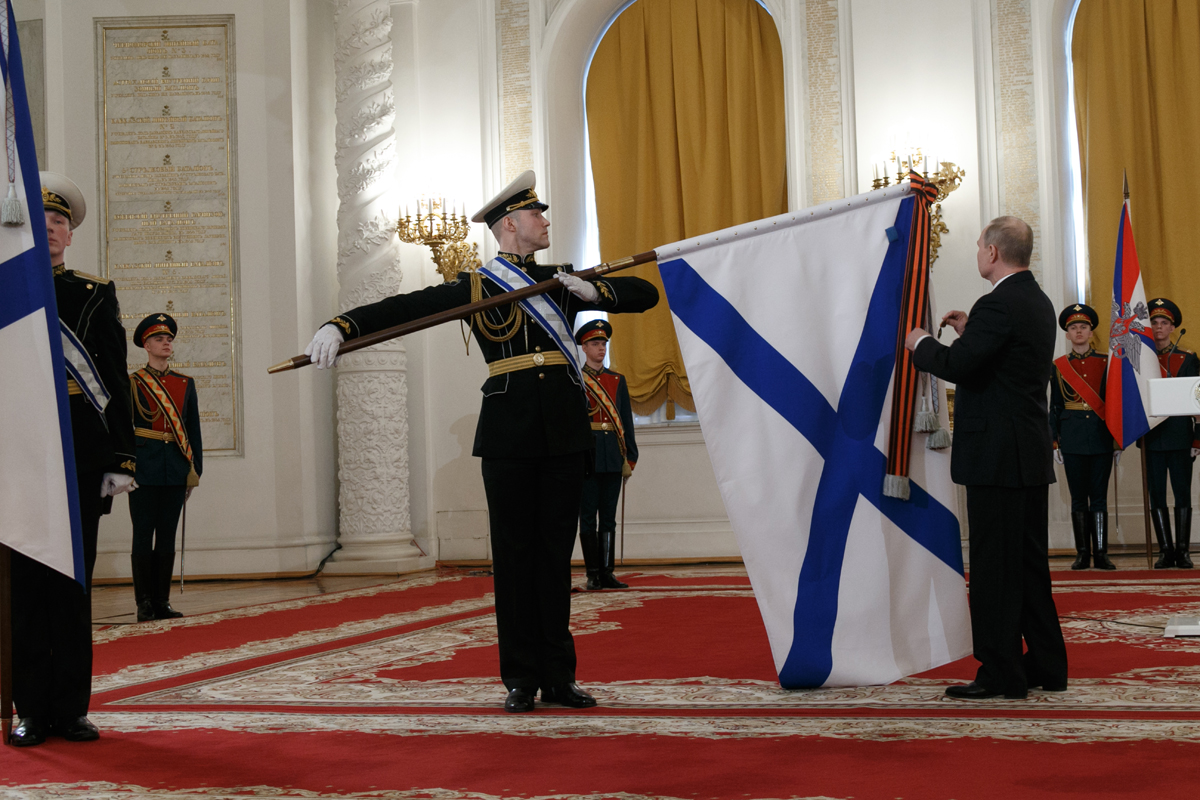
Russian President Vladimir Putin attaches the Order of Nakhimov to the ensign of the guards missile cruiser Varyag, 23 February 2018

In early January 2016, after a visit to India, Varyag entered the Mediterranean Sea through the Suez Canal to be deployed off Syria's shore replacing sister ship Moskva, in support of Russia's air operation in Syria that had begun in autumn 2015. The ship was named flagship of the Russian naval task force positioned in the eastern Mediterranean.

On 21 April 2017, the ship visited Manila (Philippines), Cam Ranh (Vietnam), Sattahip (Thailand) and Singapore.

In late 2018 Varyag completed another long voyage to India.

On 1 October 2019, Varyag, destroyer Admiral Panteleyev and tanker Pechenga embarked on a three-month deployment under the command of the Captain 1st Rank Aleksandr Shvarts, visiting Muara, Brunei between 3–7 November and Pusan, South Korea between 17 and 22 December, before returning to the homeport on 23 December.

In February–March 2021, Varyag participated in the large-scale anti-submarine, air defence and artillery exercises of the Pacific Fleet, along with a conventional submarine, destroyer Admiral Tributs, modernized frigate Marshal Shaposhnikov and universal corvettes Gromkiy and Sovershennyy, anti-submarine corvettes MPK-107, Ust-Ilimsk, Sovetskaya Gavan, Metel and MPK-82 as well as anti-ship corvettes R-14, R-18, R-20, R-29, Iney, Razliv, R-297, Smerch and others. The auxiliary ships present in the area during the exercise were Dobrynya Nikitich-class icebreaker Sadko, as well as tugs MB-99, Andrey Stepanov and at least four others.

On 1 May 2021, in a rare event two detachments of the Pacific Fleet embarked on distant deployments simultaneously, Varyag and Marshal Shaposhnikov as well as corvettes Sovershenny, Gromkiy and Aldar Tsidenzhapov. Both detachments were supported by large sea tanker Boris Butoma. On 11 May, Admiral Tributs was also reported on a deployment, calling at Singapore between 11 and 13 May, accompanied by tug Kalar. All in all, all active major surface combatants of the Pacific Fleet were deployed simultaneously, i.e. a cruiser, three destroyers and three corvettes. Tanker Boris Butoma called at Cam Ranh, Vietnam between 15 and 19 May and at Philippines on 22 May. Sovershenny and Gromkiy held exercises in the Philippine Sea on 30 May.

Between 7 and 24 June 2021, Varyag led the largest exercise of the post-Soviet Pacific Fleet that took place in the central Pacific Ocean off Hawaii, being the first post-Cold war Russian naval exercise in that area (minor exceptions being destroyer Admiral Panteleev taking part in RIMPAC-2012 exercise and frigate Admiral Gorshkov sailing near Hawaii in 2019). Besides cruiser, it included destroyers Marshal Shaposhnikov and Admiral Panteleyev, corvettes Sovershenny, Gromkiy and Aldar Tsydenzhapov, a nuclear submarine, (likely Omsk) intelligence ship Kareliya and tanker Irkut.

The exercise started in the central Pacific Ocean on 10 June and on 21 June, the ships 2500 nautical miles southeast of the Kuril islands simulated an attack on the enemy carrier strike group. Prior to that, the ships operated in two groups, sailing at 300 nautical miles from each other, one of them playing the role of enemy. The largest auxiliary ship of the Russian Navy Marshal Krylov also took part in the exercise and acted as a command ship for the commander of the exercise, rear admiral Konstantin Kabantsov, commander of Primorskaya Flotilla, as well as hospital ship Irtysh and MiG-31 interceptors and Il-38 and Tu-142 anti-submarine aircraft.

On 24 June, the final day of the exercise, three Tu-95 bombers, several Tu-22M bombers, escorted by interceptors MiG-31BM and two Il-78 tankers flew to the central Pacific Ocean as well. The Tu-95s delivered conditional strikes against the enemy's critical infrastructure and Tu-22M delivered strikes against the enemy's conditional carrier strike group together with Varyag and Marshal Shaposhnikov. It was suggested that the exercise was an answer to the exercise Agile Dagger 2021 of the US Pacific Fleet, employing one third of the operational submarines of the US Pacific Fleet.

In September 2021, Varyag conducted an exercise off Kamchatka along with nuclear submarine Omsk and 12 ships and support vessels of the Pacific Fleet. The cruiser fired a Vulkan missile, while Omsk fired a Granit missile.

In October 2021, Varyag was underway in the Sea of Japan again.

On 23 November 2021, Dalzavod reported on its Instagram channel that the cruiser entered its dry dock.

On 29 December 2021, Varyag, along with destroyer Admiral Tributs and tanker Boris Butoma, left Vladivostok for a long deployment, consisting of port calls in several countries. On 11 January 2022, the warships entered the Indian Ocean, and called at Kochi on 14 January 2022. On 18 January 2022, the taskforce anchored in Chabahar, and reports stated that the ships plan to hold joint-exercises with the Iranian and Chinese navies. On 2 February 2022, the cruiser entered the Mediterranean via the Suez Canal and linked-up with her sister ship, Marshal Ustinov deploying to the Mediterranean from the Northern Fleet. In July 2022, Varyag, Admiral Tributs and intelligence ship Vasily Tatishchev became the first Russian Navy's ships operating in the Adriatic Sea since 1995 Volk's deployment amid US bombardment of Bosnia and Herzegovina. In late July, destroyer Admiral Tributs operated off Šibenik, intelligence ship Vasily Tatishchev operated near island Palagruža, cruiser Varyag operated near Durrës, while frigate Admiral Grigorovich remained just outside the Adriatic Sea. As the US carrier Truman was located in the Adriatic Sea at the same time, there were reports in media about Russian warships simulating blocking the US carrier to the Adriatic Sea.

In October 2022, Varyag, Admiral Tributs and Boris Butoma departed the Mediterranean via the Suez Canal likely returning to their bases in the Pacific. On 18 November, the three ships returned to Vladivostok.

On 1 March 2024, the vessel Varyag embarked upon a formal visit to the Port of Colombo, situated in Colombo, Sri Lanka. This visit is scheduled to extend until 3 March 2024.

On 01 April 2024 Varyag entered the Mediterranean via the Suez Canal and on 04 April 2024 anchored outside the port of Tartus, Syria. On 17 July, the ship left the Mediterranean via the Suez Canal.

On 8 August 2024, the ship, along with Russian frigate Marshal Shaposhnikov reached the Indian port of Cochin Port for replenishment. On 23 August, the two ships returned to Vladivostok.

In July 2026, the cruiser was flagship of a Russian Pacific Fleet task force participating in exercises with the Chinese Navy.

== See also ==
- Chervona Ukraina for another ship named for Red Ukraine

== Gallery ==
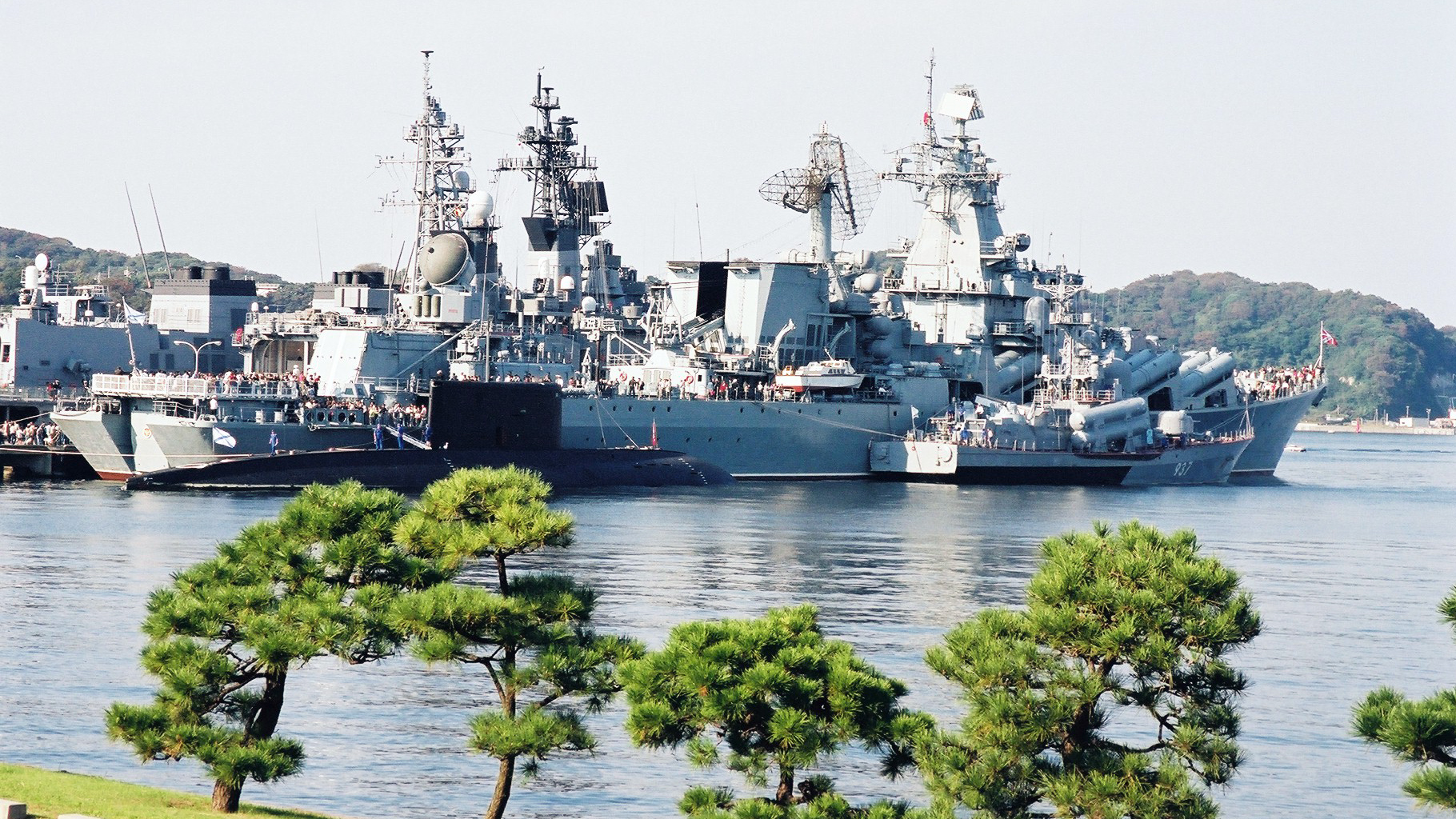
Visiting Port of Yokosuka, Japan in Oct. 2002

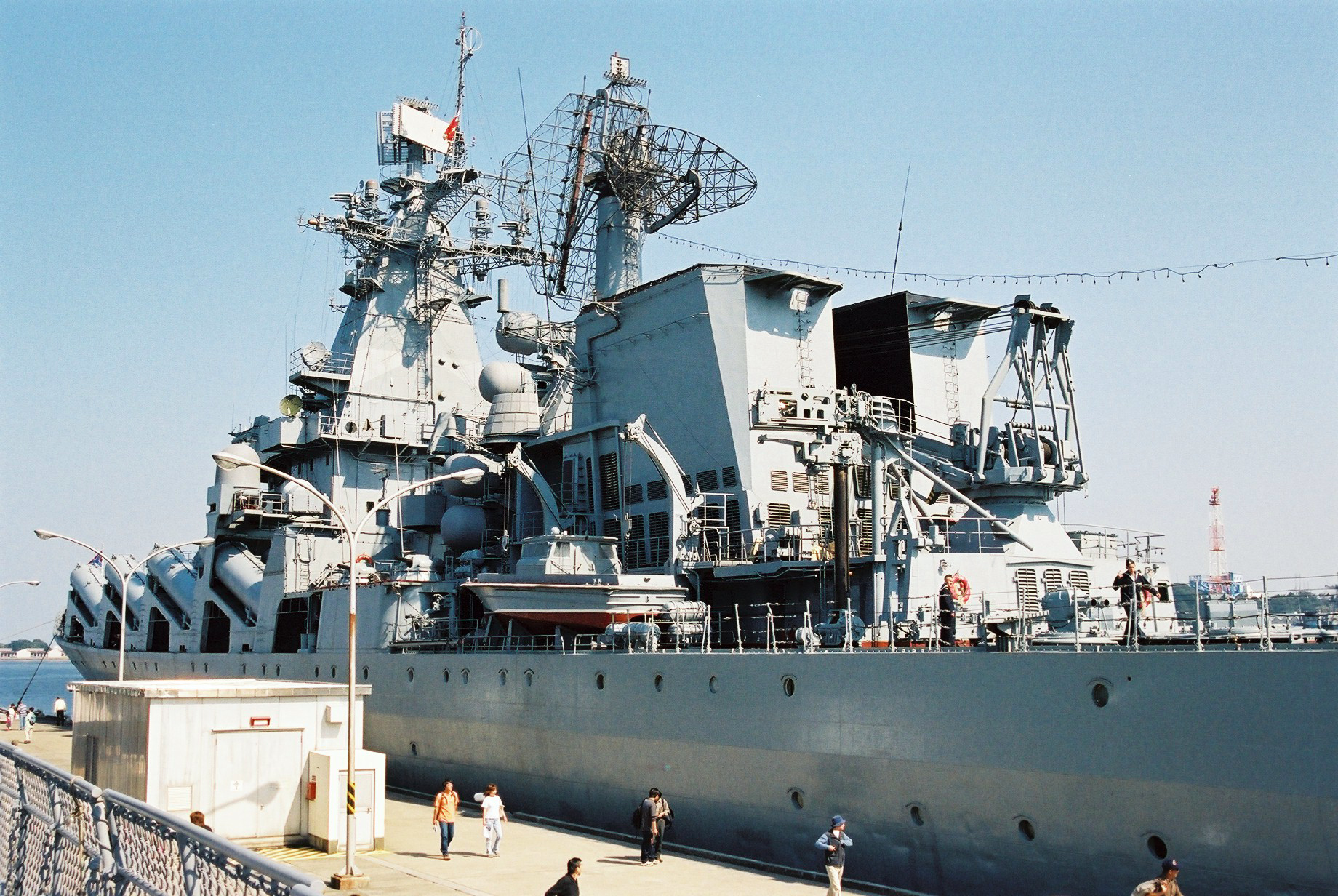
Visiting Port of Yokosuka, Japan in Oct. 2002

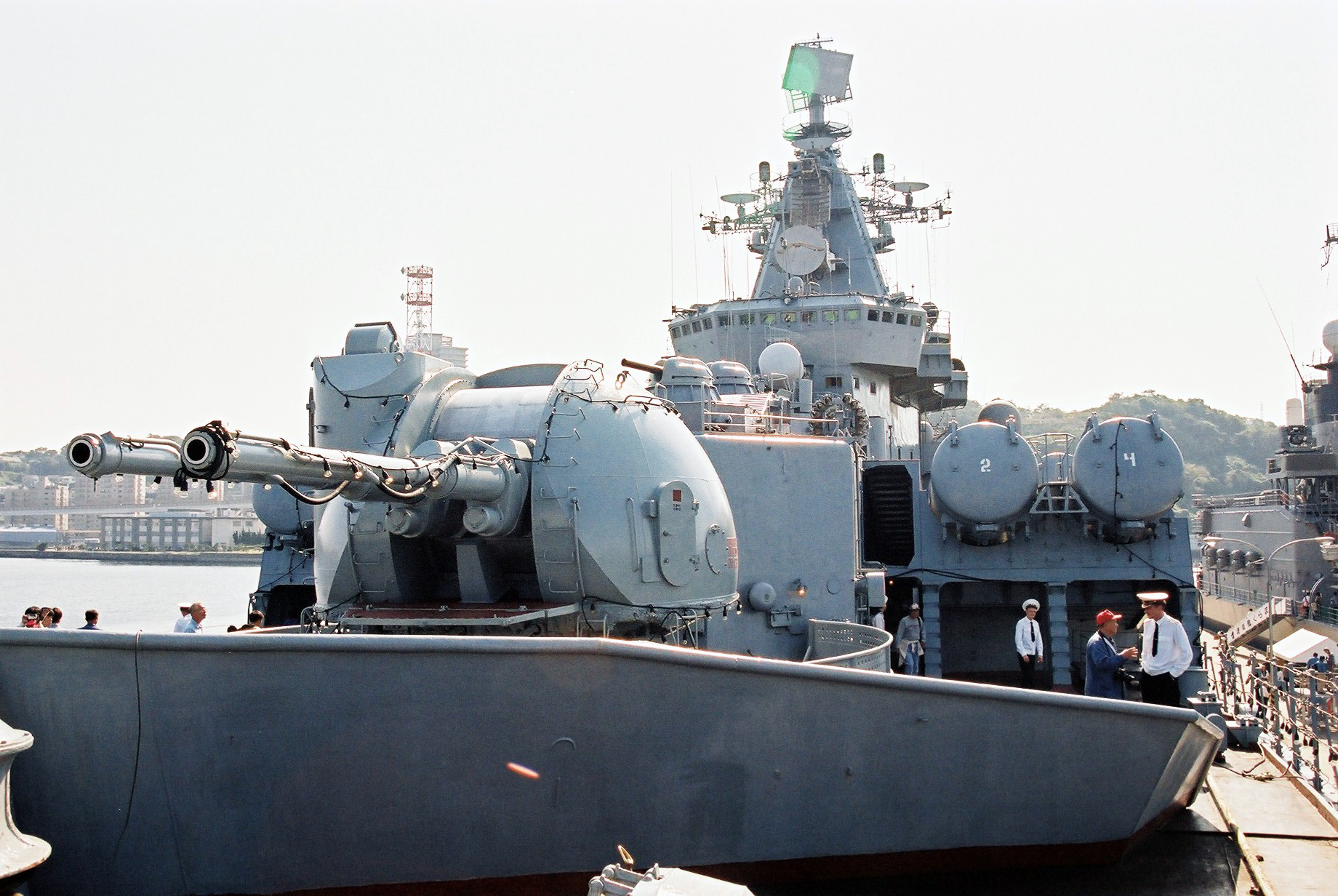
Visiting Port of Yokosuka, Japan in Oct. 2002

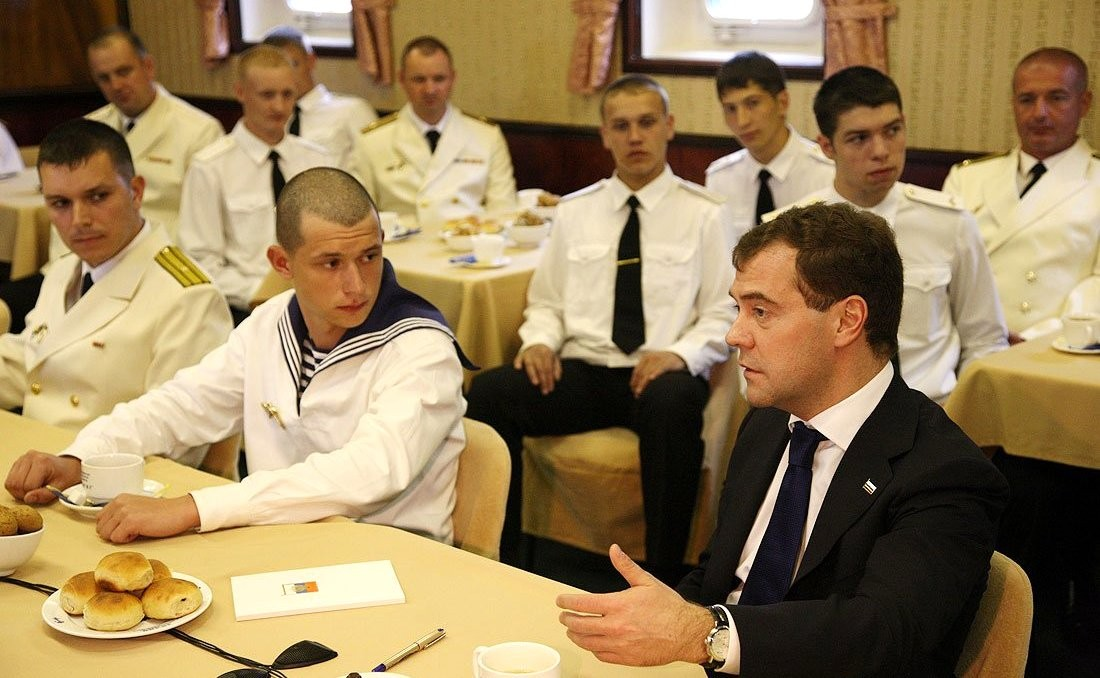
Dmitry Medvedev meeting with sailors in 2009.

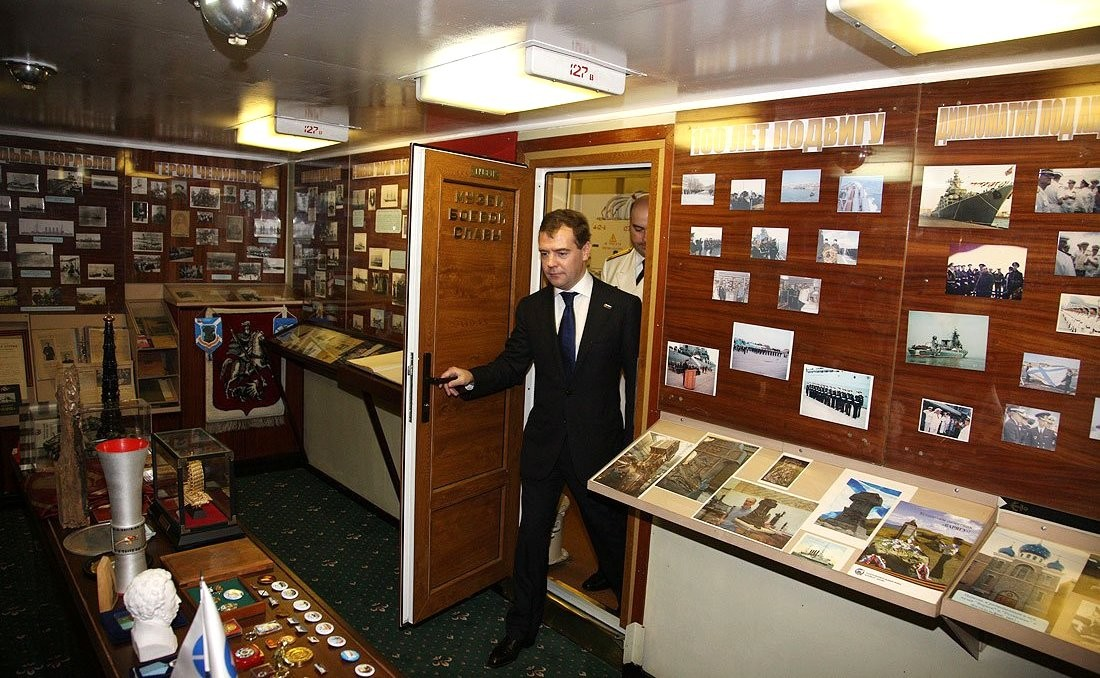
Dmitry Medvedev visiting ship's museum aboard the cruiser Varyag.

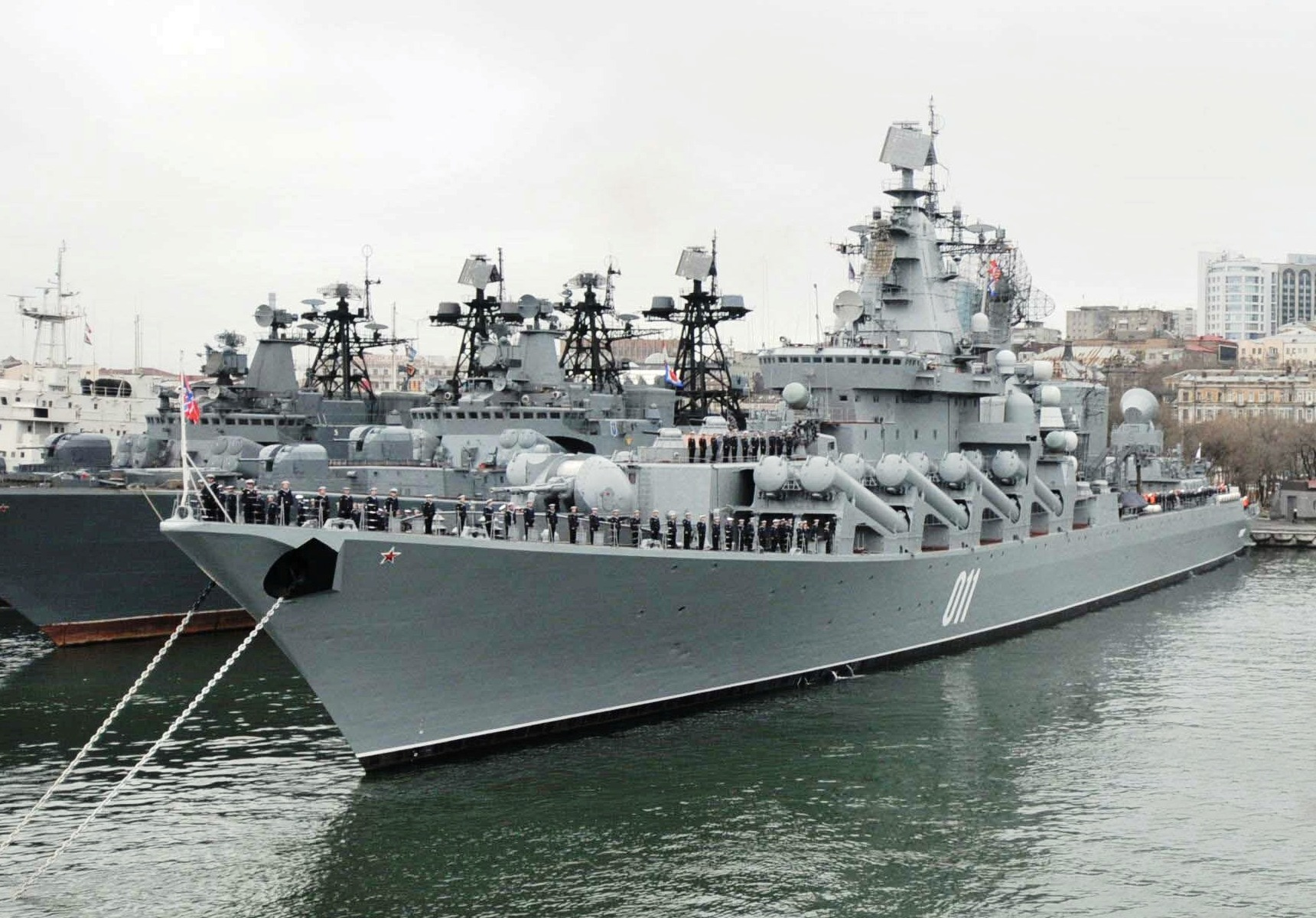
Varyag in Vladivostok, 2010.

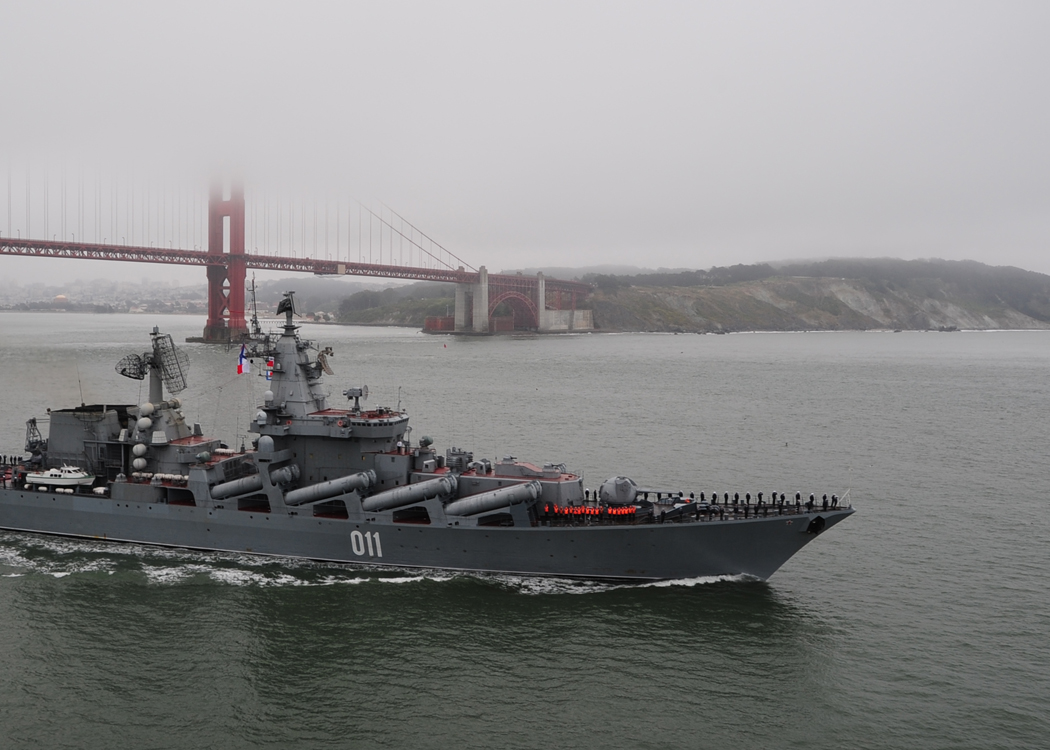
2010 San Francisco visit

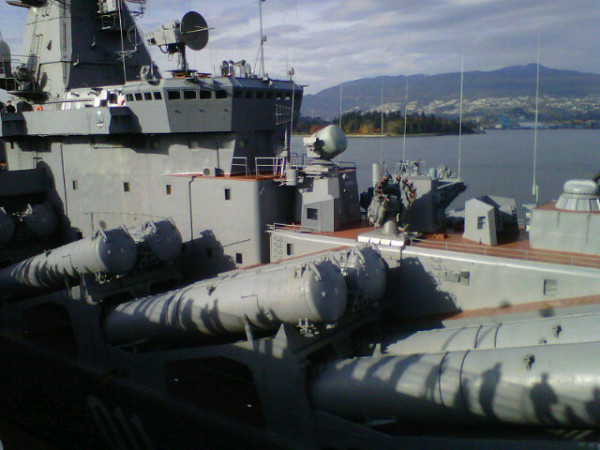
Visiting Vancouver, Canada in November 2011.

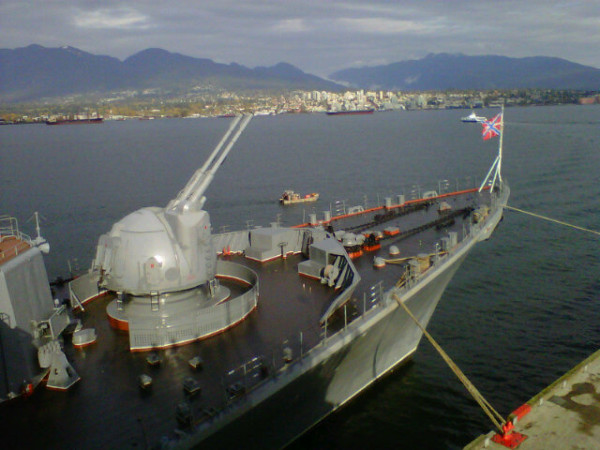
A close view of the AK-130 dual purpose guns on the bow with Vancouver's north shore in the background.

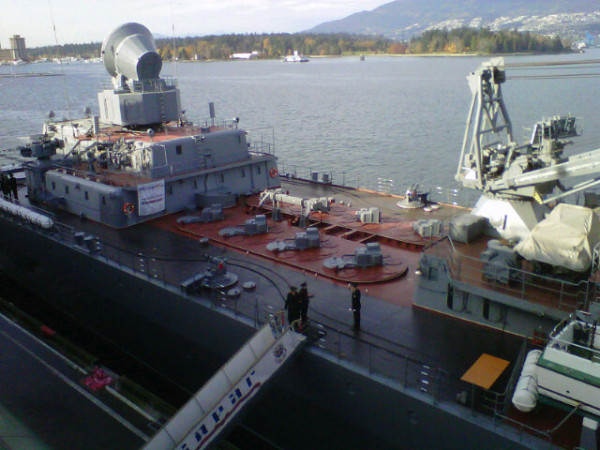
A close view of the S-300PMU Favorit SAM tubes on the mid deck, Vancouver.
