= Sergei Alyokminsky =

Russian naval officer

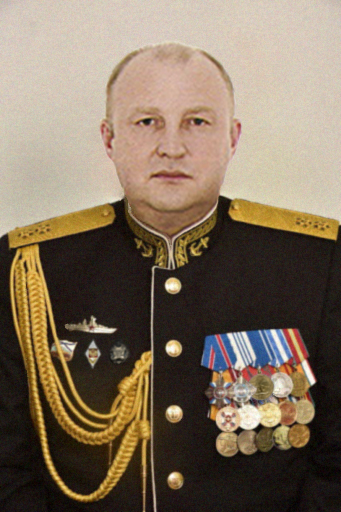
- Alyokminsky in c. 2021
- Born: 26 September 1961 (age 64); Baley, Chita Oblast, Russian SFSR, Soviet Union
- Allegiance: USSR; Russia
- Branch: Soviet Navy; Russian Navy
- Service years: 1978-2016
- Rank: Vice-Admiral
- Commands: Caspian Flotilla
- Awards: Order of Military Merit; Order of Naval Merit; Order of Honour

Sergei Gavrilovich Alyokminsky (Russian: Сергей Гаврилович Алёкминский; born 26 September 1961) is an officer of the Russian Navy. He currently holds the rank of Vice-Admiral, and served as deputy commander of the Eastern Military District between 2014 and 2016, and as commander of the Caspian Flotilla from 2010 to 2014.

== Biography ==
Alyokminsky was born on 26 September 1961 in Baley, in what was then Chita Oblast, Russian Soviet Federative Socialist Republic, in the Soviet Union. He entered the Soviet Navy, studying at the Pacific Higher Naval School in Vladivostok, graduating from its Mine and Torpedo Weapons Department in 1983. He was assigned to the Northern Fleet, where he rose through the ranks and positions from commander of the combat unit of a small anti-submarine ship to the chief of staff of the anti-submarine ship division of the anti-submarine ship brigade in 1991. He then served as chief of staff of the Kola Flotilla's anti-submarine ship division from 1991 to 1994, before undertaking further studies at the Kuznetsov Naval Academy. He graduated in 1996 and was assigned to the Pacific Fleet, becoming deputy chief and chief of the operations department of the Primorsky Group of Diverse Forces.

In 2003, Alyokminsky enrolled at the Military Academy of the General Staff, graduating in 2005 and subsequently returning to the Pacific Fleet, where he was appointed chief of the fleet's Combat Training Directorate's organizational and planning department. Also in 2005 he was assigned to the post of chief of staff of the Sovgavansky naval region, becoming the region's commander in 2006, followed by the post of chief of staff and first deputy commander of the Northeastern Group of Troops and Forces in 2008. Concurrently with this post he served as chief of staff and first deputy commander of the Pacific Fleet. He was promoted to rear admiral on 23 February 2008, and on 5 September 2010 Alyokminsky was appointed commander of the Caspian Flotilla by decree of the President of Russia. Promoted to vice admiral on 13 December 2012, in July 2014, Alyokminsky was reassigned to the position of deputy commander of the Eastern Military District.

Alyokminsky subsequently appears to have left active service, and by 2022 was recorded as the director of the North-Western Centre for Radioactive Waste Management (SevRAO), a branch of the Federal Environmental Operator under Rosatom.

== Honours and awards ==
Over his career Alyokminsky has received the Order of Military Merit, the Order of Naval Merit, the Order of Honour, and various medals.

== Family and personal life ==
Alyokminsky is married and has two children.

Military offices
Preceded by Viktor Kravchuk	Commander of the Caspian Flotilla; 2010-2014	Succeeded by Ildar Akhmerov
