= Russian destroyer Admiral Tributs =

1983 Udaloy-class destroyer

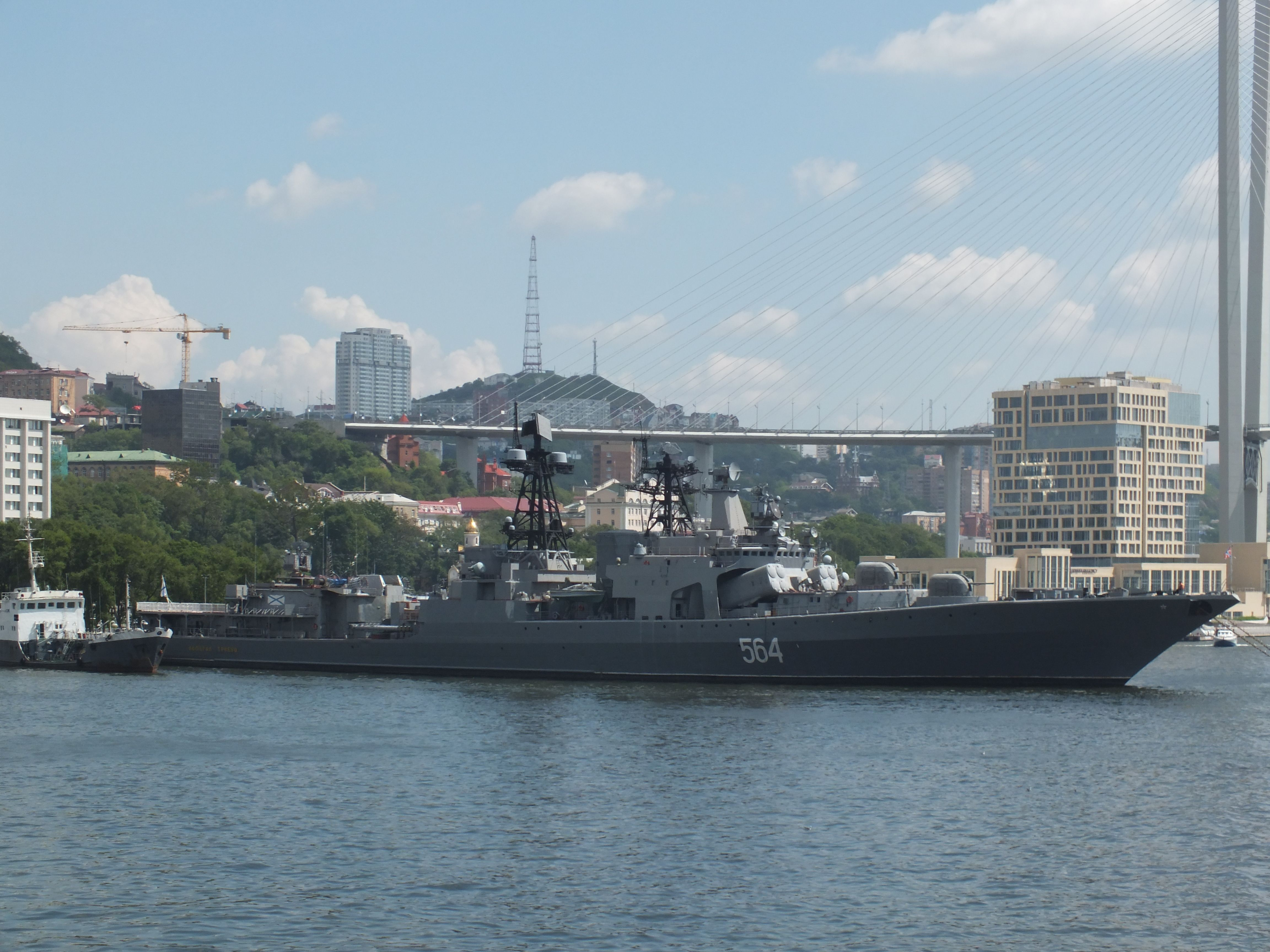
- Admiral Tributs in Vladivostok

History

Russia
- Name: Admiral Tributs
- Namesake: Vladimir Filippovich Tributs
- Builder: A.A. Zhdanov, Leningrad
- Yard number: 783
- Laid down: 19 April 1980
- Launched: 26 March 1983
- Commissioned: 30 December 1985
- Identification: BPK
- Status: in active service

General characteristics
- Class & type: Udaloy-class destroyer
- Displacement: 6,200 t (6,102 long tons) standard; 7,900 t (7,775 long tons) full load
- Length: 163 m (535 ft)
- Beam: 19.3 m (63 ft)
- Draught: 7.8 m (26 ft)
- Propulsion: 2 shaft COGAG, 4 gas turbines, 89,000 kW (120,000 hp)
- Speed: 35 knots (65 km/h; 40 mph)
- Range: 10,500 nautical miles (19,400 km) at 14 knots (26 km/h; 16 mph)
- Complement: 300
- Sensors & processing systems: Radar: MR-760MA Fregat-MA/Top Plate 3-D air search radar and MR-320M Topaz-V/Strut Pair air/surface search radar; Sonar: MGK-355 Polinom sonar complex; Fire Control: 2 MR-360 Podkat/Cross Sword ASW control, 2 K-12-1/Hot Flash SAM control, Garpun-BAL SSM targeting
- Electronic warfare & decoys: Bell Squat jammer; Bell Shroud intercept; Bell Crown intercept; 2 × PK-2 decoy RL
- Armament: 2 × quadruple 84R/URPK-4 Metel-U anti submarine missiles; 8 × vertical launchers for 3K95 Kinzhal surface to air missiles; 2 × single 100 mm (3.9 in) guns; 4 × 30 mm (1.2 in) AK-630 Gatling guns; 2 × quadruple 553 mm (21.8 in) CHTA-53-1155 torpedo tubes, Type 53-65K, SET-65 ASW/ASuW torpedo; 2 × RBU-6000 anti submarine rocket launchers
- Aircraft carried: 2 x Ka-27 'Helix' series helicopters
- Aviation facilities: Helicopter deck and hangar

Admiral Tributs (Адмирал Трибуц) is a Project 1155 Large Anti-Submarine Ship (Большой Противолодочный Корабль, BPK) of the Russian Navy. Known in the west as an Udaloy-class destroyer, the ship is named after admiral Vladimir Filippovich Tributs. Launched in 1983, Admiral Tributs serves in the Russian Pacific Fleet, and has taken part in operations alongside the naval forces of other nations like China, India and Japan, and as part of a peacekeeping force in the Middle East between 1992 and 1993.

== Design ==
Admiral Tributs is the sixth ship of a class of twelve Project 1155 Fregat (also known as the Udaloy class). The vessel is designated as a Large Anti-Submarine Ship (Большой Противолодочный Корабль, BPK) in accordance with its primary mission of countering submarines and a destroyer by NATO.

The vessel is 163 m (534.8 ft) long with a beam of 19.3 m (63.3 ft) and a draught of 7.8 m (25.6 ft). Displacement was 6,200 t (6,102 long tons) standard and 7,900 t (7,775 long tons) full load. Power is provided by four 23,000 kW (31,000 hp) hp GTA M-9 propulsion complexes, each comprising a 6,300 kW (8,500 hp) M-62 and a 16,800 kW (22,500 hp) hp M-8KF powering two fixed pitch propellers. which gave a maximum speed of 29.5 knots (55 km/h; 34 mph). Cruising range was 6,882 nmi (12,745 km; 7,920 mi) at 14 kn (26 km/h; 16 mph) and 4,000 nmi (7,408 km; 4,603 mi) at 18 kn (33 km/h; 21 mph).

=== Armament ===
To combat submarines, Admiral Tributs mounts two quadruple launchers for eight missiles in the Metel Anti-Ship Complex along with two RBU-6000 12-barrel rocket launchers for close in defence. The ship is also equipped with two quadruple 553 mm (21.8 in) CHTA-53-1155 torpedo tubes for 53-65K, SET-65 torpedoes. A hangar aft accommodates two Kamov Ka-27 helicopters for anti-submarine warfare. Protection from aircraft was provided with eight 3K95 Kinzhal missiles mounted in vertical launchers supplemented by 100 mm (4 in) AK-100 DP guns and four 30 mm (1.2 in) AK-630 Gatling guns.

=== Electronic warfare ===
The vessel is equipped with the MR-760 Fregat-MA (NATO reporting name 'Top Plate') air/surface search, MR-320V Topaz-V ('Strut Pair') air/surface search and MR-212/201-1 Vaygach-U navigation radars along with MR-350 Podkat ('Cross Sword') and K-12-1 ('Hot Flash') fire control radars. The MGK-355 Polinom sonar complex (combining 'Horse Jaw' bow mounted and 'Horse Tail' variable depth sonars) is complemented by two MG-7 Braslet anti-saboteur sonars and the MG-35 Shtil-2 underwater communication system.

== Service ==
Admiral Tributs was laid down on 19 April 1980 and launched on 26 March 1983. The ship is named after Vladimir Filippovich Tributs.

She was accepted into the Pacific Fleet on 15 February 1986 and attached to the 183rd Anti-Submarine Warfare Brigade. The ship served in the Indian Ocean in 1987, visiting Aden, South Yemen, and 1990, visiting Penang, Malaysia. Between 5 December 1992 and 23 May 1993, the vessel undertook peacekeeping duties in the Persian Gulf, followed by a lengthy modernisation at Dalzavod, Vladivostok that lasted from March 1994 to March 2003.

Resuming service, between 10 and 15 February 2004, Admiral Tributs joined Varyag on a visit to Incheon, South Korea, to celebrate the centenary of the battle between Varyag and the Japanese fleet during the Battle of Chemulpo Bay. In 2005, the vessel took part in joint exercises with India, visited Tanjung Priok, Indonesia, Singapore. Sattahip, Thailand, Danang, Vietnam, Victoria, Seychelles and Klang, Malaysia, took part in exercises with Moskva and Pyotr Velikiy and joint exercises with the Japan Maritime Self-Defense Force alongside Admiral Panteleyev. Following a visit to Ho Chi Minh City, Vietnam, in April 2012, the vessel joined sisterships Admiral Vinogradov and Marshal Shaposhnikov for joint exercises with the People's Liberation Army Navy.

=== 2021 ===
In February 2021, the ship conducted exercises in the Sea of Japan.

In late December 2021, Admiral Tributs, along with cruiser Varyag, left Vladivostok for a long deployment, consisting of port calls in several countries. On 11 January 2022, the warships entered the Indian Ocean, and called at Kochi on 14 January 2022.

=== 2022 ===
In February 2022, in the context of the Russian invasion of Ukraine, Admiral Tributs entered the Mediterranean Sea, along with cruiser Varyag and tanker Boris Butoma, joining the Permanent task force of the Russian Navy in the Mediterranean Sea. In July 2022, Admiral Tributs, Varyag and intelligence ship Vasily Tatishchev became the first Russian Navy's ships operating in the Adriatic Sea since 1995 Volk's deployment amid US bombardment of Bosnia and Herzegovina. In late July, destroyer Admiral Tributs operated off Šibenik, intelligence ship Vasily Tatishchev operated near island Palagruža, cruiser Varyag operated near Durrës, while frigate Admiral Grigorovich remained just outside the Adriatic Sea. As the US carrier Truman was located in the Adriatic Sea at the same time, there were reports in media about Russian warships simulating blocking the US carrier in the Adriatic Sea.

In October 2022, Admiral Tributs, Varyag and Boris Butoma departed the Mediterranean via the Suez canal, returning to Vladivostok on 18 November.

=== 2023 ===
On 27 October 2023, Admiral Tributs and Admiral Panteleyev departed Indonesia after a friendly visit. In November, it also took part in Indra Navy exercise with Indian Navy.

=== 2025 ===
On 6 August 2025, Admiral Tributs took part in the annual joint Russian Navy-People's Liberation Army Navy patrol in the northern Pacific Ocean, with the Chinese destroyer Shaoxing and the oiler Qiandaohu. They were shadowed by the Japan Maritime Self Defense Force frigate Murasame and an aircraft. After leaving the Sea of Japan, Admiral Tributs and the Chinese ships arrived at Avacha Bay naval base on the Kamchatka Peninsula on 12 August, and departed on 14 August to continue the naval exercise.

== Pennant numbers ==
Pennant number	Date
415	1985
472	1987
592	1988
552	1992
564	1993

== Gallery ==
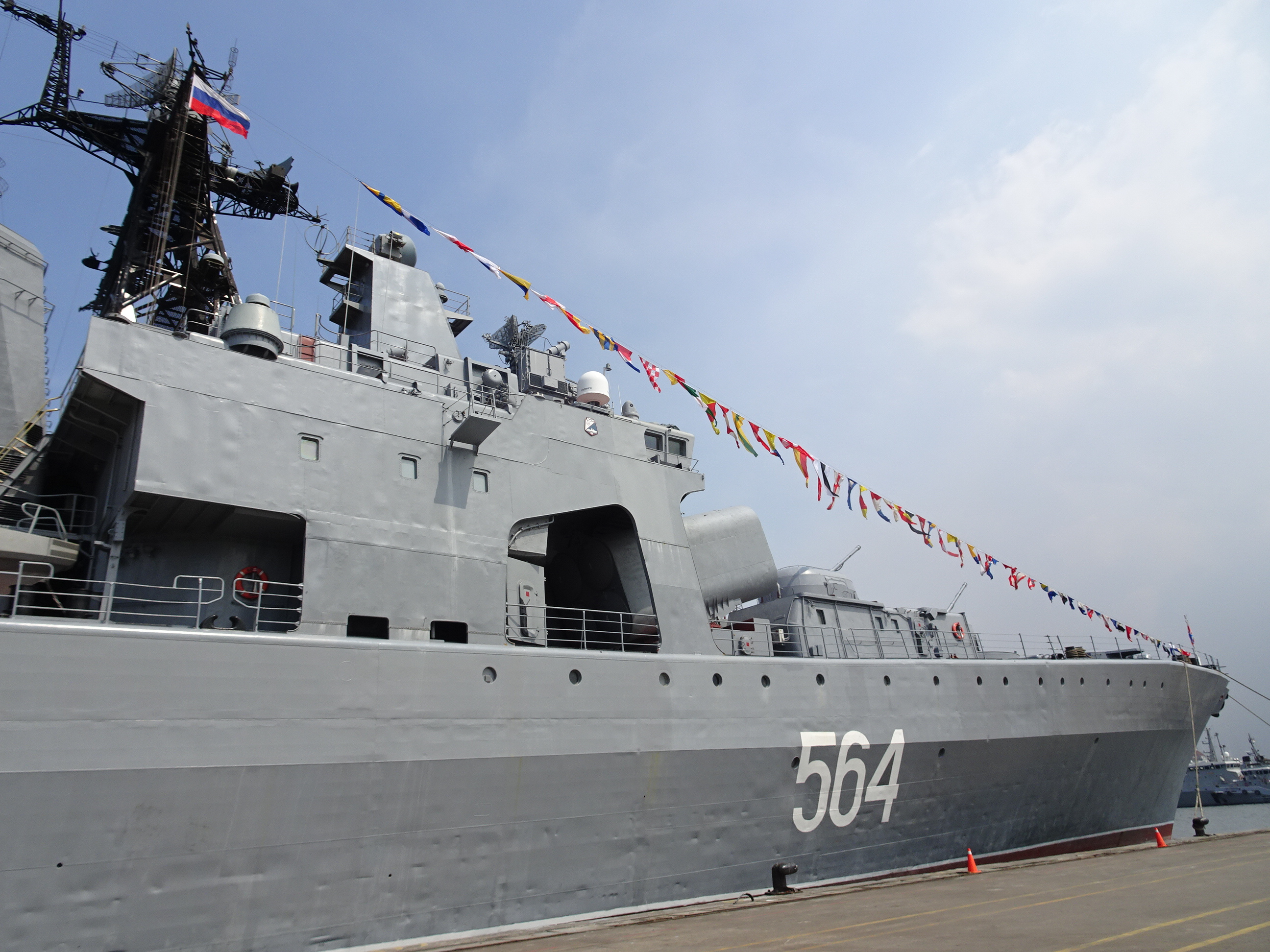
Admiral Tributs moored at Tanjung Priok in Jakarta

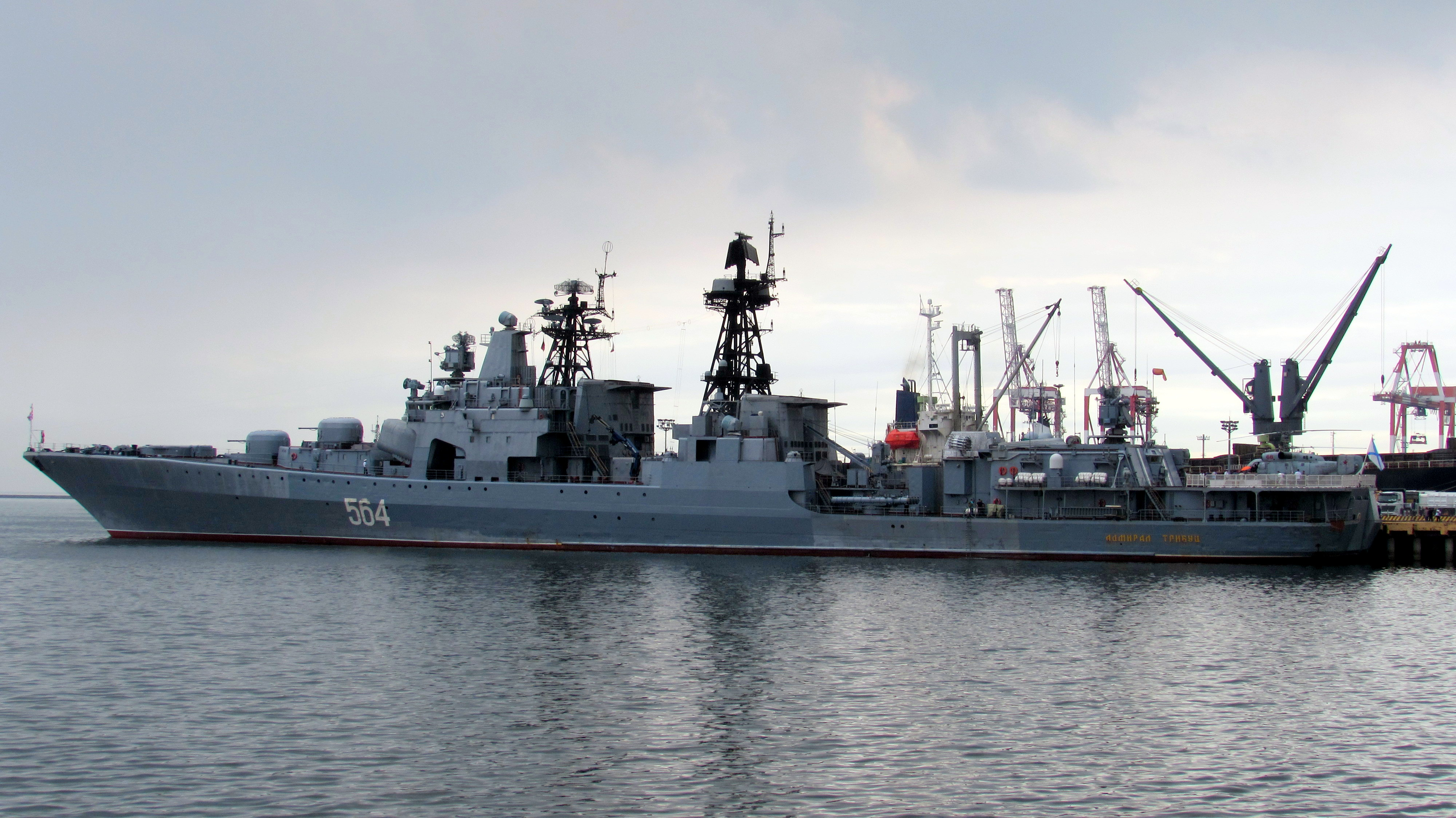
Admiral Tributs moored at Manilla South Harbour

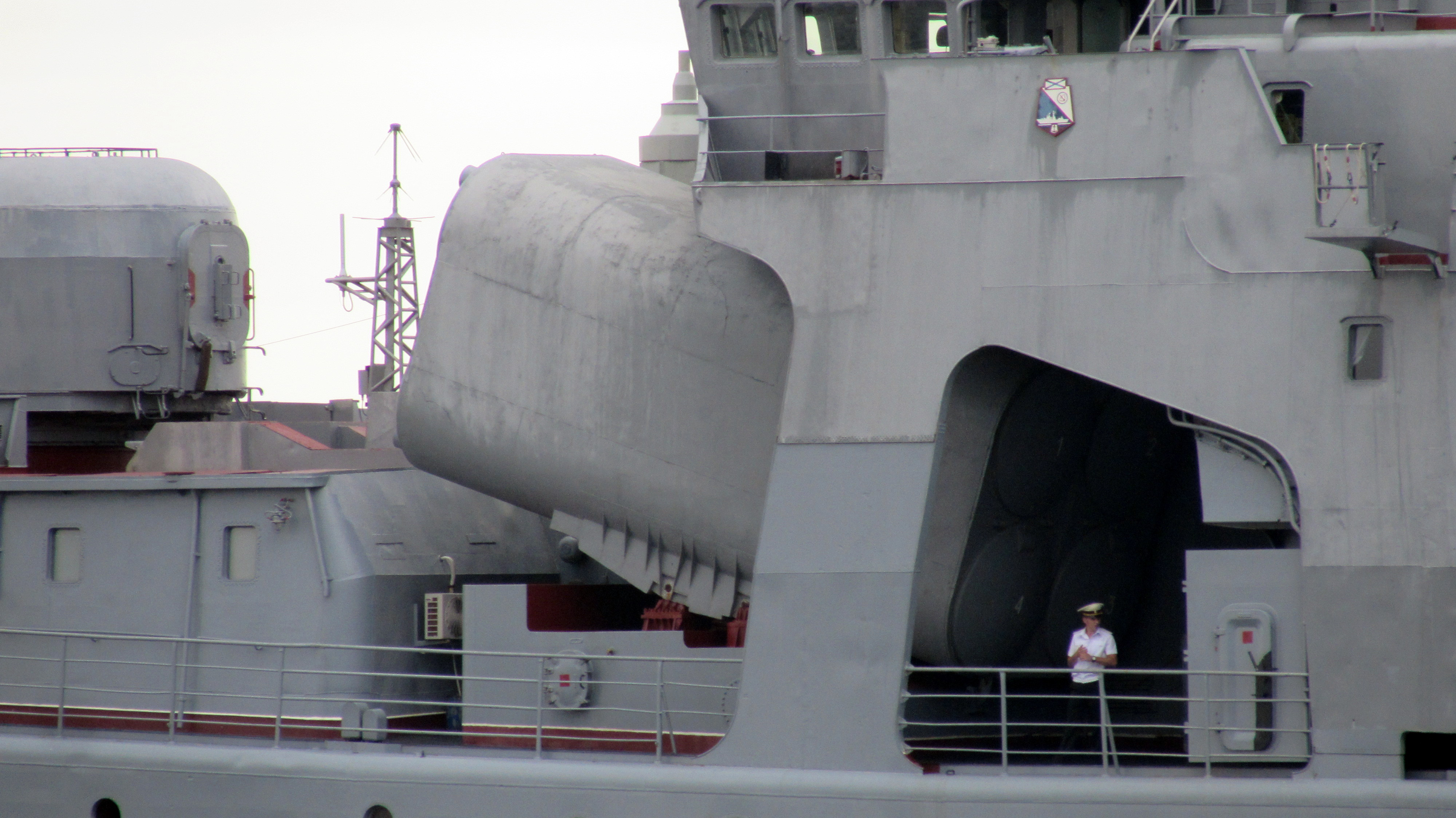
KT-106U launchers for 84R/URPK-4 Metel-U anti-submarine missiles on Admiral Tributs

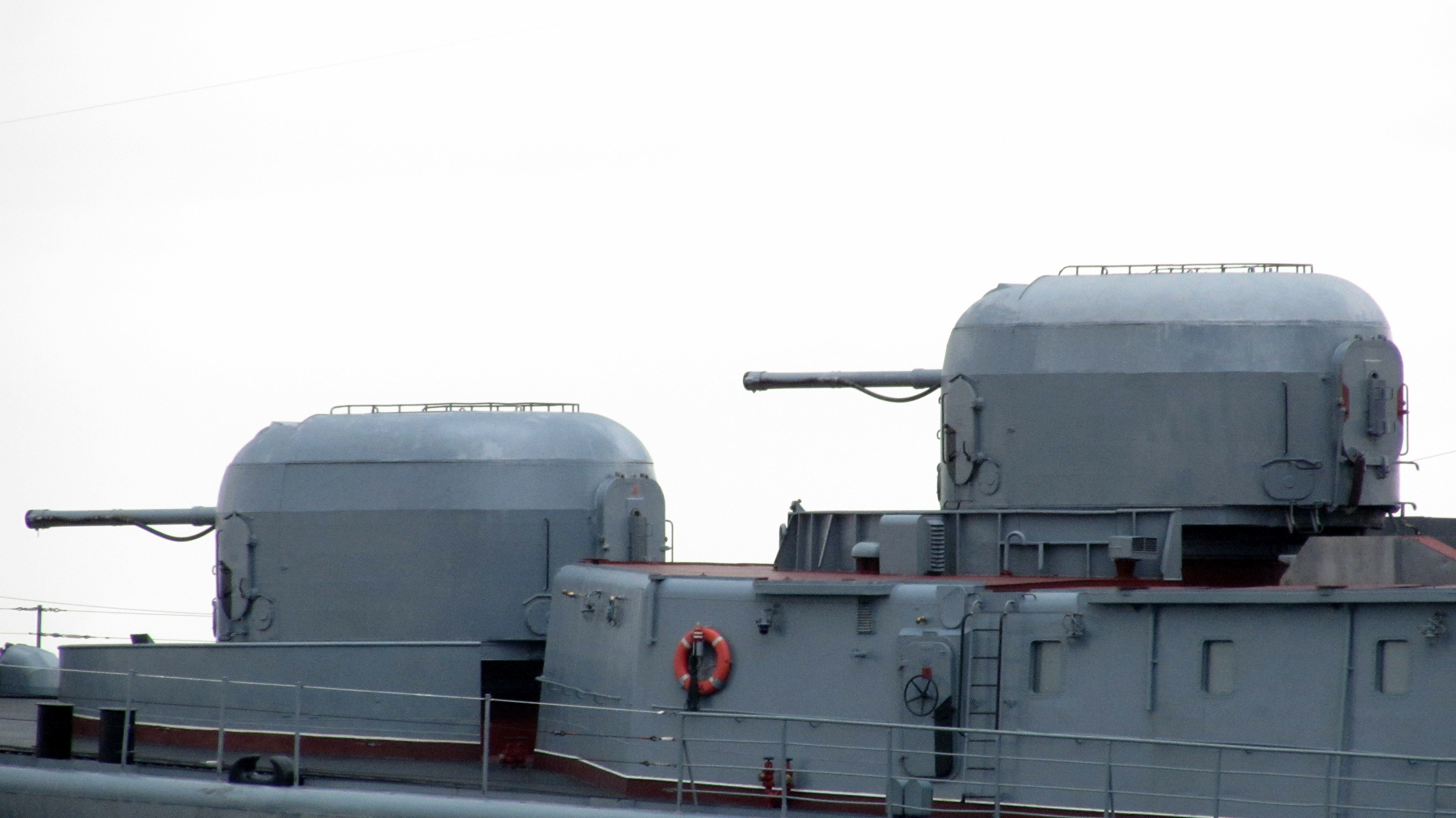
Rear view of the two 100 mm AK-100 guns of Admiral Tributs

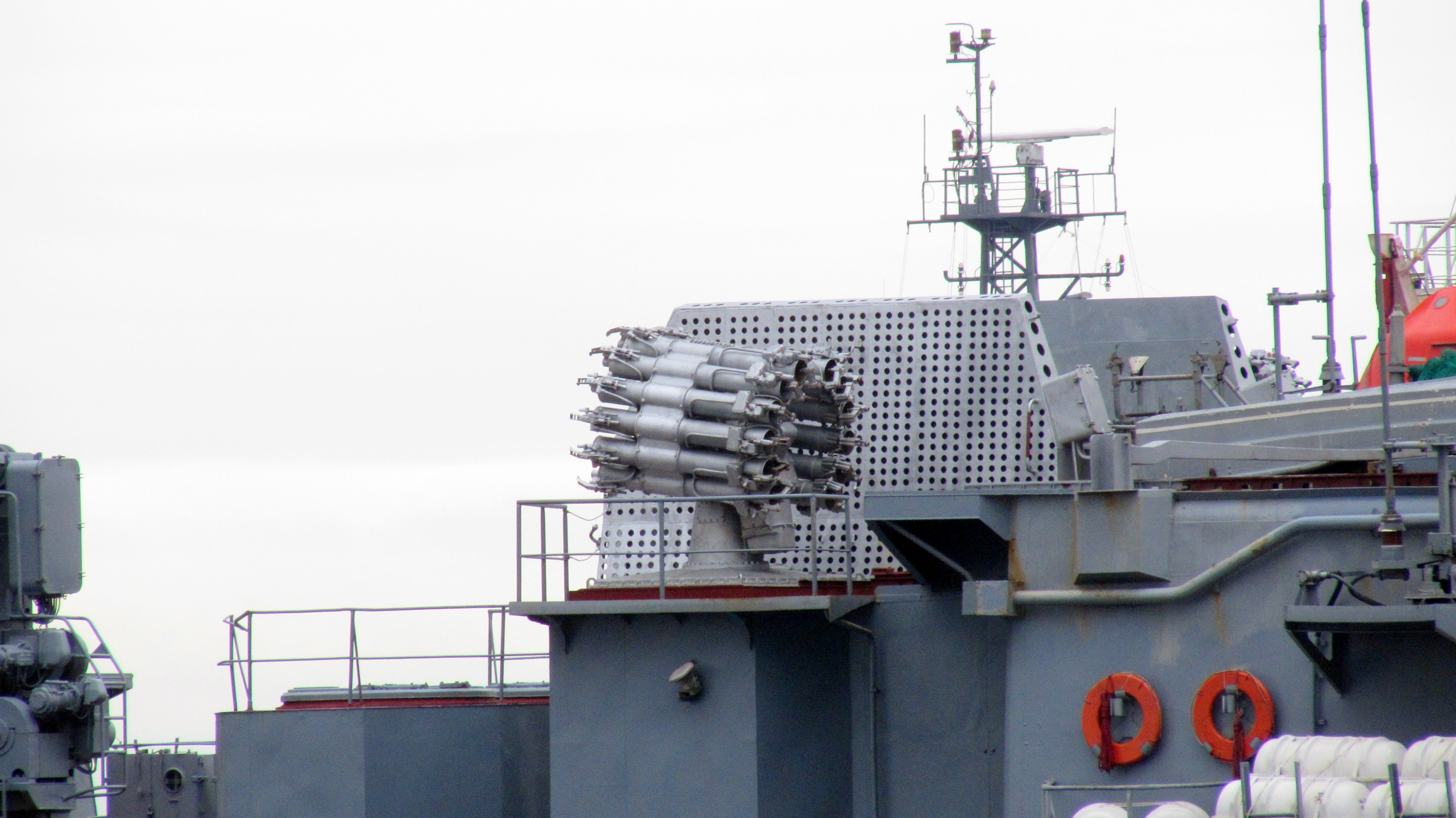
An RBU-6000 Anti Submarine Rocket Launcher on Admiral Tributs

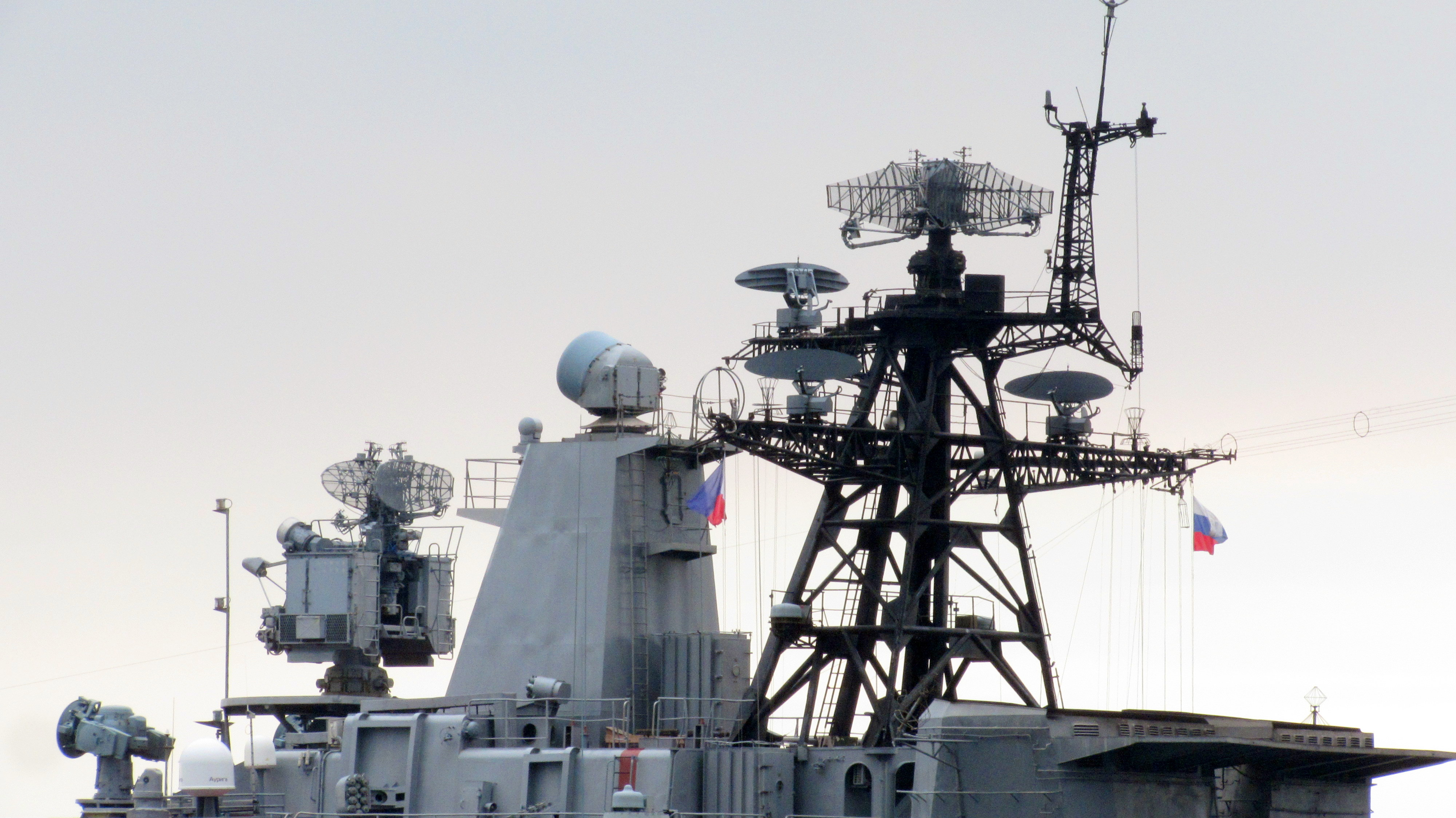
The Masts and Radars of Admiral Tributs

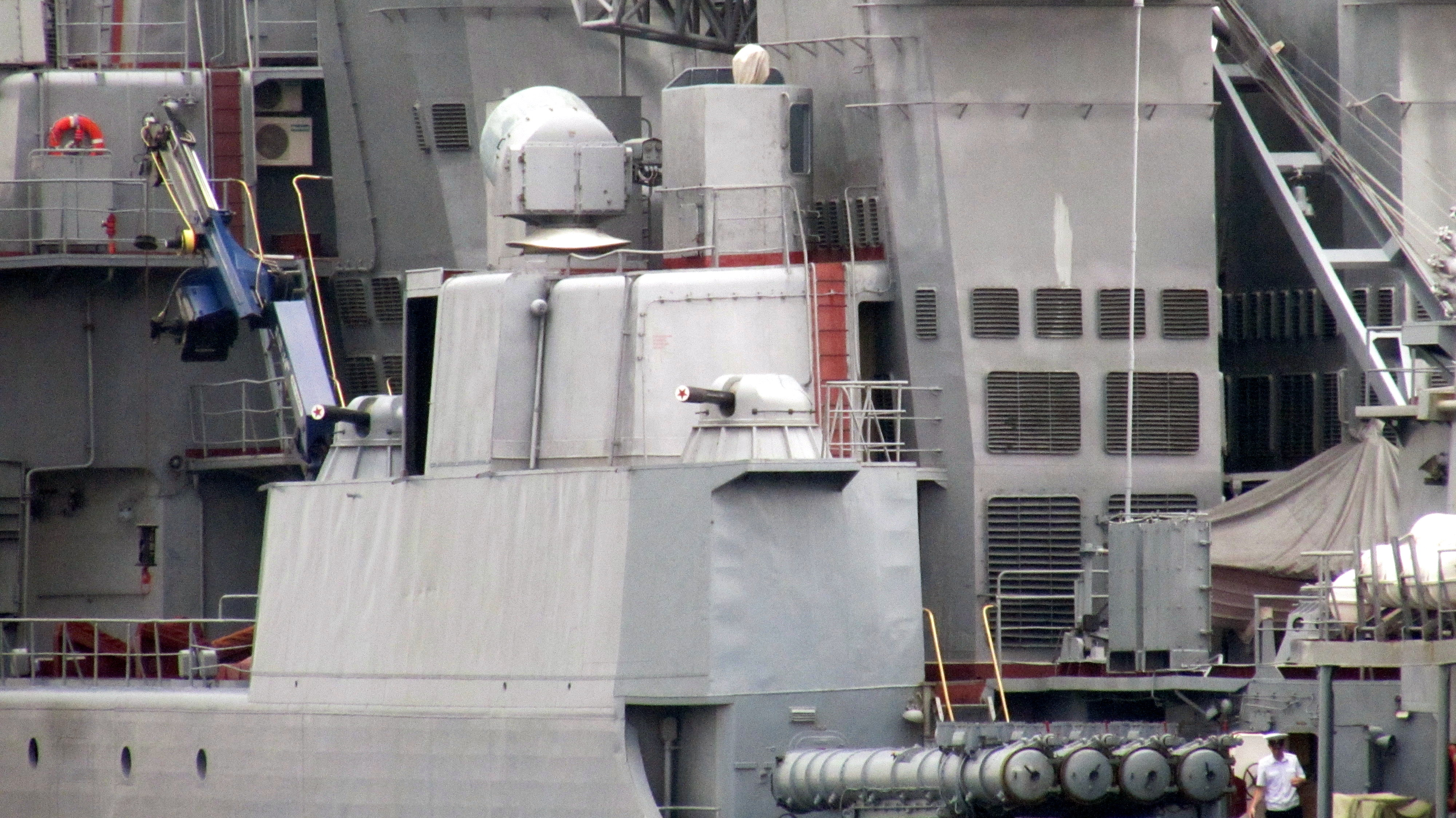
Side view of an AK-630 Close In Weapons System (CIWS) of Admiral Tributs

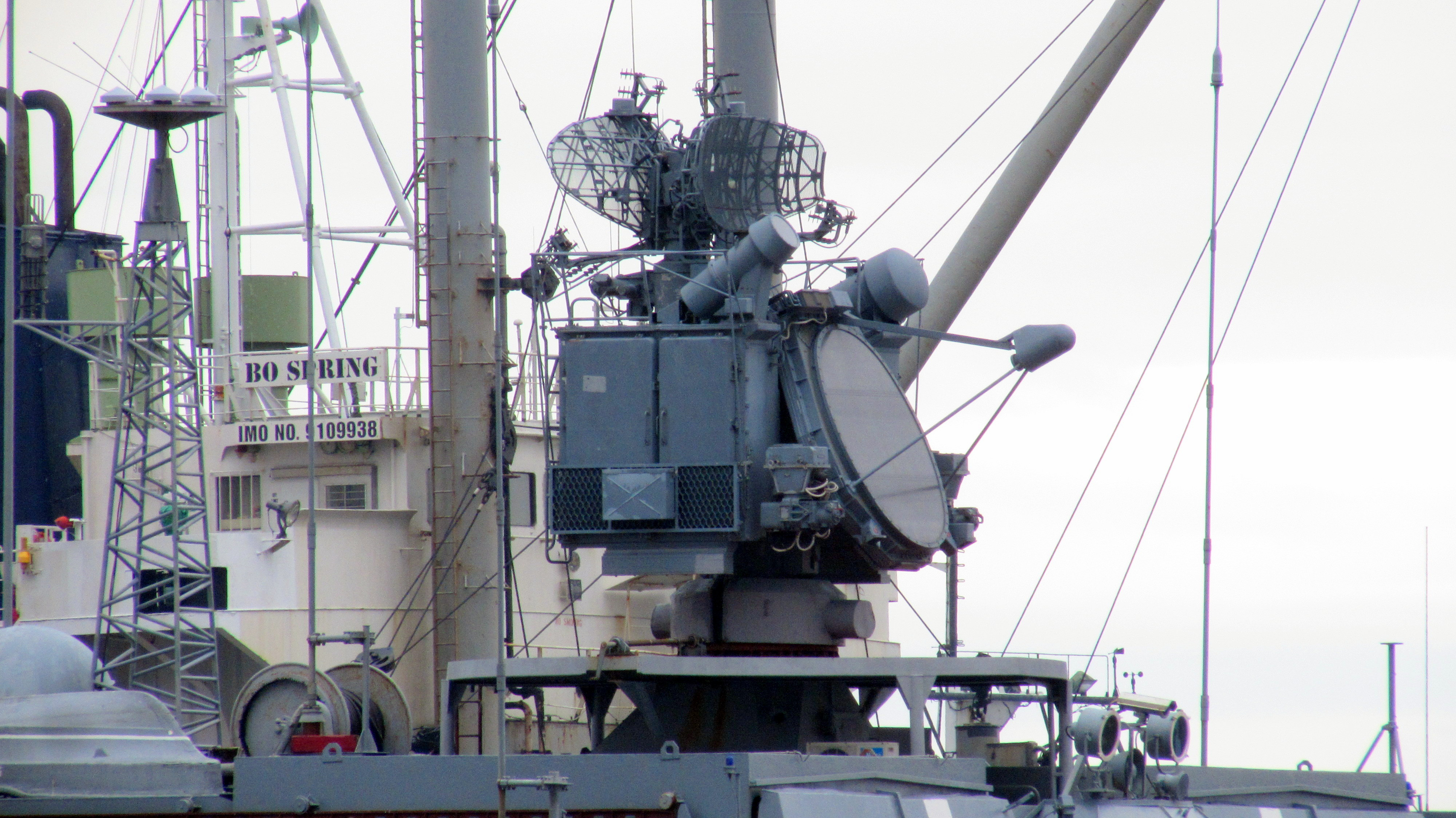
An MR360 Cross Sword Fire Control Radar (FCR) of the Admiral Tributs

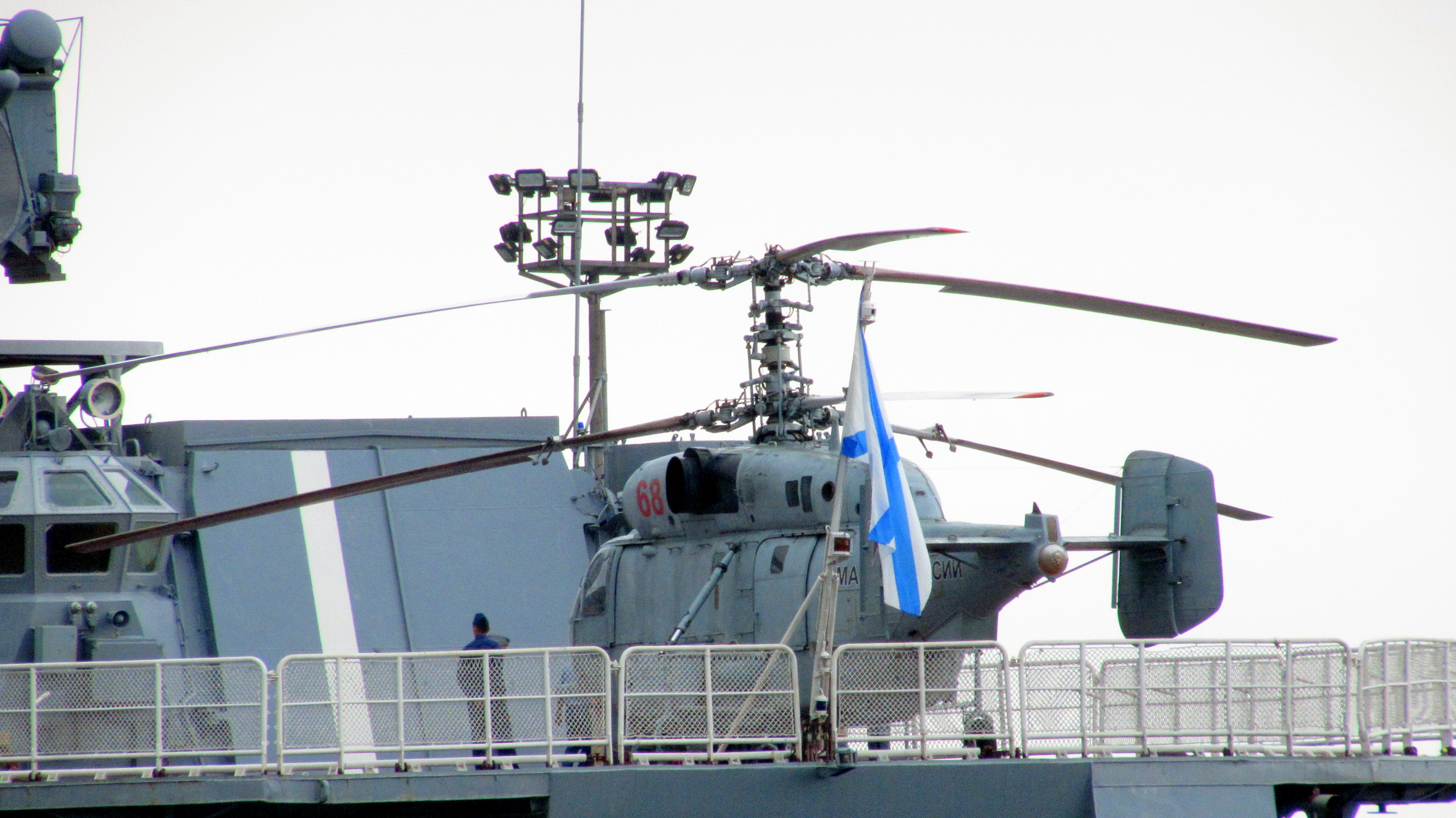
Rear view of an Ka-27 Anti-Submarine Warfare (ASW) Helicopter of Admiral Tributs
