= MV Moscow University =

Ship built in 1999

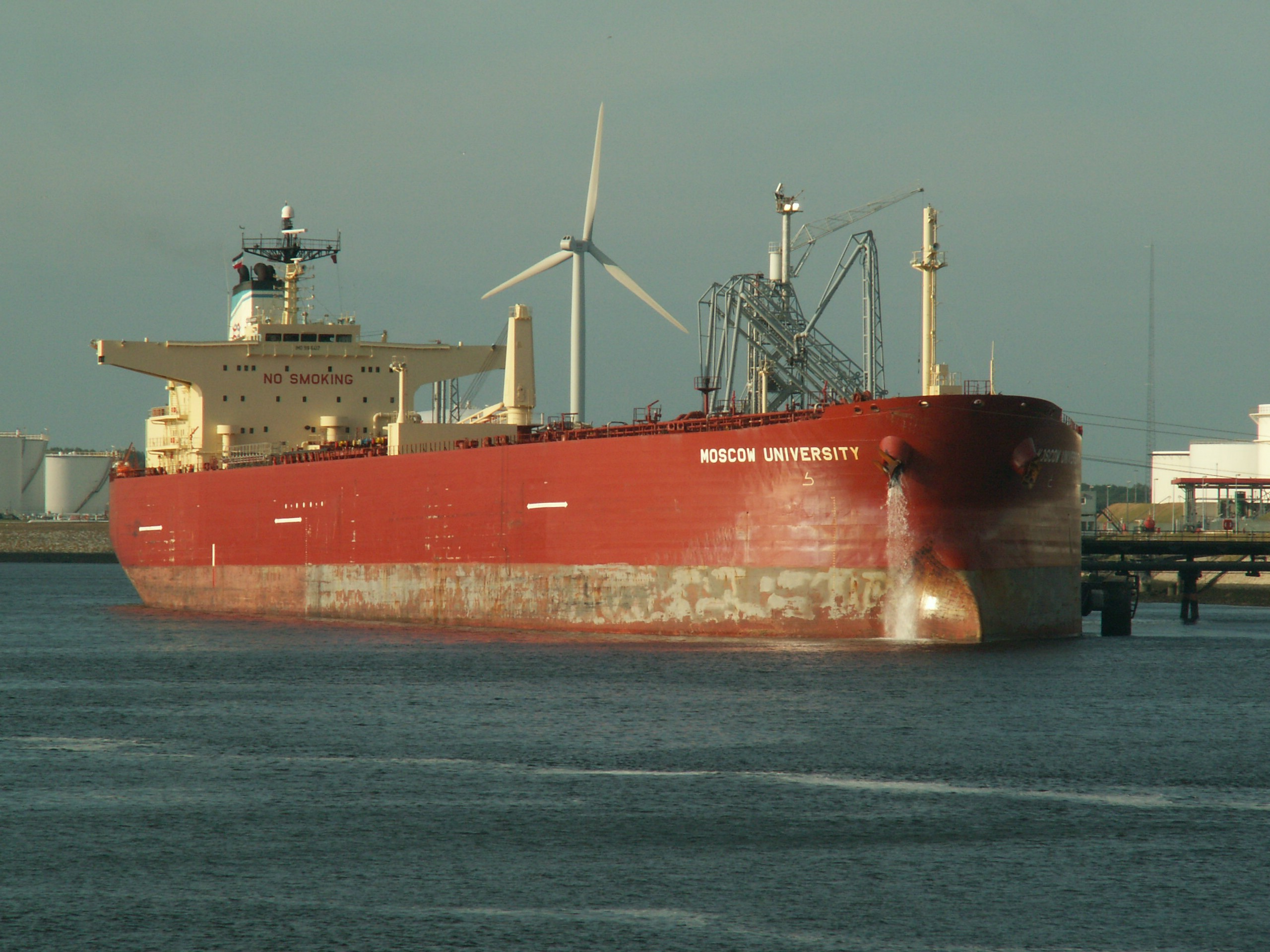
- Moscow University at Rotterdam

History
- Name: Moscow University
- Owner: Novoship Novorossiysk, Russia (member of the SovComFlot Group)
- Operator: Novoship (UK) Ltd
- Port of registry: (Liberia) Monrovia
- Ordered: February 1997
- Builder: NKK Corporation
- Cost: $40,260,000
- Yard number: 185
- Launched: 15 December 1998
- Completed: 26 March 1999
- Identification: IMO number: 9166417; Callsign ELWE8

General characteristics
- Class & type: Crude oil tanker
- Tonnage: 56,076 GT; 32,748 NT
- Length: 243.00 m (797 ft 3 in) overall; 233.00 m (764 ft 5 in) between perpendiculars
- Beam: 42.03 m (137 ft 11 in)
- Draught: 14.75 m (48 ft 5 in)
- Depth: 20.70 m (67 ft 11 in)
- Installed power: Sulzer 6RTA58T diesel engine
- Propulsion: Single shaft
- Speed: 15.1 knots (28.0 km/h; 17.4 mph)
- Capacity: 113,477 m^{3} (4,007,400 cu ft) cargo capacity in 12 tanks
- Crew: 23

Moscow University (Russian: Московский университет, romanized: Moskovskiy Universitet) is a 56,076 GT tanker, which was ordered in 1997. The ship is notable for being captured by Somali pirates on 5 May 2010 and rescued the following day by a Russian Navy warship.

== Description ==
Moscow University was ordered in February 1997. The ship was constructed by NKK Corporation, Tsu, Japan, at a cost of $42,260,000. Built as hull number 185, it was launched on 19 December 1998 and delivered to her owners on 26 March 1999.

Moscow University is 243.00 metres (797 ft 3 in) long overall, with a beam of 42.03 metres (137 ft 11 in). The ship has a depth of 20.70 metres (67 ft 11 in) and a draught of 14.75 metres (48 ft 5 in). It is propelled by a 6-cylinder Sulzer 6RTA58T diesel engine of 12,000 kilowatts (16,000 hp) driving a single screw propeller, which can propel Moscow University at 15.1 knots (28.0 km/h; 17.4 mph).

Moscow University is allocated the IMO Number 9166417 and uses the call sign ELWE8.

== History ==
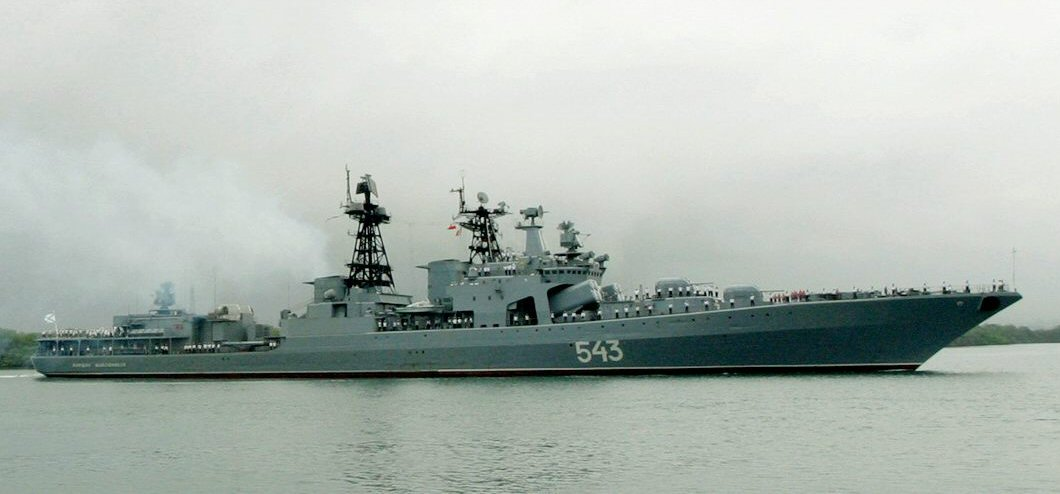
Russian destroyer Marshal Shaposhnikov

Moscow University was built for Fancy Maritime SA, which is owned by Novoship Novorossiysk, Russia. The ship was managed by Novoship (UK) Ltd., but management was transferred back to Russia in 2008, when many London-based employees of Novoship (U.K.) Ltd. were (starting in May 2008) made redundant. In December 2009, it was the first ship to leave Kozmino, Russia, with a cargo of oil, and was bound for Hong Kong.

=== Hijack and rescue ===
On 5 May 2010, Moscow University was attacked by Somali pirates some 500 nautical miles (930 km; 580 mi) off the coast of Somalia. The crew locked themselves in the ship's radar room or engine room. The Udaloy-class destroyer Marshal Shaposhnikov was sent to assist Moscow University.

On 6 May 2010, the Russian destroyer Marshal Shaposhnikov arrived and fired two warning shots. The rescue operation then began when Marshal Shaposhnikov opened fire on the pirates with its cannons. Under the cover of this fire, a helicopter from the ship landed on the hijacked ship's deck and inserted Naval Infantry commandos on board, who quickly rescued the hijacked vessel. The entire crew escaped unharmed. One pirate was killed and 10 detained during the operation. Later, the pirates were set adrift in an inflatable boat – without weapons or navigation equipment – some 300 nautical miles (560 km; 350 mi) from the coast. According to sources within the Russian Ministry of Defence, they did not reach the coast and likely died at sea. The pirates' disappearance has raised speculation that they were in fact executed by the Russian commandos, particularly in the light of Russian President Dmitri Medvedev's comments that "We'll have to do what our forefathers did when they met the pirates".
