= Shaposhnikov, Belgorod Oblast =

Shaposhnikov Шапошников
- Khutor
- Location within Belgorod Oblast Location within Russia
- Coordinates: 50°32′N 38°44′E
- Country: Russia
- Region: Belgorod Oblast
- District: Alexeyevsky District
- Time zone: UTC+3:00

Shaposhnikov (Russian: Шапошников) is a rural locality (a khutor) in Alexeyevsky District, Belgorod Oblast, Russia. The population was 14 in 2010. There is one street.

== Geography ==
Shaposhnikov is located 15 km southeast of Alexeyevka (the district's administrative centre) by road. Menyaylovo is the nearest rural locality.
