= Shaposhnikov (surname) =

Shaposhnikov (Russian: Шапошников) is a Russian occupational masculine surname originating from the word shaposhnik, meaning hatter, its feminine counterpart is Shaposhnikova. The surname is known in Russia since at least 17th century and may refer to:

- Adrian Shaposhnikov (1888–1967), Russian classical music composer
- Aita Shaposhnikova (born 1957), Yakut translator and critic
- Aleksei Shaposhnikov (1899–1962), Soviet football player
- Aleksei Shaposhnikov (politician) (born 1973), Russian politician
- Anna Shaposhnikova (born 1999), Russian handball player
- Boris Shaposhnikov (1882–1945), Soviet military commander in the interwar period
- Leonid Shaposhnikov (born 1969), Ukrainian rower
- Matvey Shaposhnikov (1906–1994), Soviet military commander
- Mikhail Shaposhnikov (born 1956), Soviet-born Swiss theoretical physicist
- Natalia Shaposhnikova (born 1961), Russian artistic gymnast
- Sergei Shaposhnikov (1923–2021), Russian football player and coach
- Tatyana Shaposhnikova (born 1946), Russian-born Swedish mathematician
- Yevgeny Shaposhnikov (1942−2020), last Minister of Defence of the Soviet Union

== See also ==
- Shaposhnik
