= Kozmino =

Kozmino (Russian: Козьмино) is the name of several rural localities in Russia:

== Modern inhabited localities ==
- Kozmino, Kotlassky District, Arkhangelsk Oblast, a village in Koryazhemsky Selsoviet of Kotlassky District of Arkhangelsk Oblast
- Kozmino, Lensky District, Arkhangelsk Oblast, a selo in Kozminsky Selsoviet of Lensky District of Arkhangelsk Oblast
- Kozmino, Kirov Oblast, a village in Smetaninsky Rural Okrug of Sanchursky District of Kirov Oblast
- Kozmino Bay, home to Kozmino (port), a seaport in Primorsky Krai near to Nakhodka, the terminus of the Eastern Siberia–Pacific Ocean oil pipeline

== Abolished inhabited localities ==
- Kozmino, Primorsky Krai, a former rural locality in Primorsky Krai; since 2004—a part of the city of Nakhodka
