= Russian frigate Marshal Shaposhnikov =

Russian naval vessel

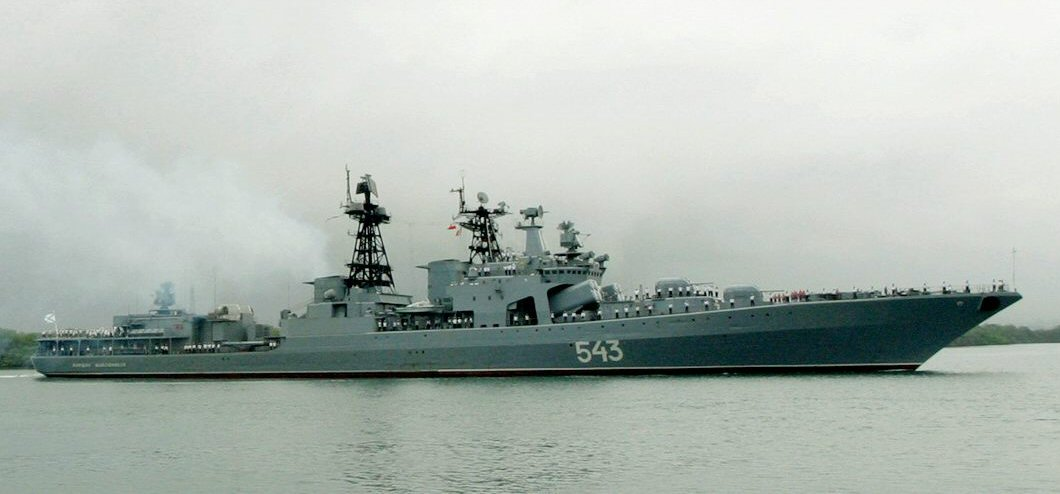
- Marshal Shaposhnikov (BPK 543) at sea

History

→ Soviet Union → Russia
- Name: Marshal Shaposhnikov
- Namesake: Boris Shaposhnikov
- Builder: Yantar Shipyard, Kaliningrad
- Laid down: 25 May 1983
- Launched: 27 December 1984
- Commissioned: 30 December 1985
- Recommissioned: 27 April 2021
- Reclassified: June 2020, as a frigate
- Refit: 2017
- Home port: Vladivostok
- Identification: BPK 543 / FR 543
- Status: In active service, returned to service in 2021 after refit

General characteristics
- Class & type: Udaloy-class destroyer (reclassified as frigate)
- Displacement: 6,200 t (6,102 long tons) standard; 7,900 t (7,775 long tons) full load
- Length: 163 m (535 ft)
- Beam: 19.3 m (63 ft)
- Draught: 7.8 m (26 ft)
- Propulsion: 2 shaft COGAG, 4 gas turbines, 89,000 kW (120,000 hp)
- Speed: 35 knots (65 km/h; 40 mph)
- Range: 10,500 nautical miles (19,400 km) at 14 knots (26 km/h; 16 mph)
- Complement: 300
- Sensors & processing systems: "Fregat-M" Air / Surface Search Radar; 5P-30N2 "Fregat-N2" Air / Surface Search Radar; MG-757 "Anapa-M" anti-saboteur sonar system; MR-123-02/3 "Bagira" Fire Control Radar
- Electronic warfare & decoys: TK-25-2 EW system; PK-10 countermeasure launchers
- Armament: 16 UKSK VLS cells for Kalibr, Oniks, Zircon and Otvet missiles; 8 (2 × 4) 3M24 anti-ship missiles; 64 (8 × 8) VLS cells for Kinzhal surface-to-air missiles; 1 × 100 mm (3.9 in) A-190 gun; 4 × 30mm AK-630 Close-in weapons system; 2 × 4 553 mm (21.8 in) torpedo tubes, Type 53 ASW/ASuW torpedo; 2 × RBU-6000 anti submarine rocket launchers
- Aircraft carried: 2 x Ka-27 'Helix' series helicopters
- Aviation facilities: Helicopter deck and hangar

Marshal Shaposhnikov (Russian: Маршал Ша́пошников) is a modernized Udaloy-class frigate (originally classified as a destroyer) of the Russian Navy commissioned in 1985. The vessel serves in the Russian Pacific Fleet. Her namesake is Marshal Boris Shaposhnikov.

== Operational history ==
On 6 April 2003, Marshal Shaposhnikov left port, along with Admiral Panteleyev and the navy tanker Vladimir Kolechitskiy, to start a deployment to the Indian Ocean, where exercises with the Indian Navy were planned for May 2003. A number of Black Sea Fleet ships, plus, possibly, cruise missile submarines, joined the deployment.

On 6 May 2010, Russian Naval Infantry deployed from Marshal Shaposhnikov rescued the hijacked tanker MV Moscow University. The entire crew escaped unharmed. Moscow University had been hijacked by Somali pirates on 5 May 2010 off Socotra Island.

In November 2014, Marshal Shaposhnikov was part of a four-ship deployment to international waters off Australia. The deployment was believed to be linked to the 2014 G-20 Brisbane summit and growing tensions between the two nations.

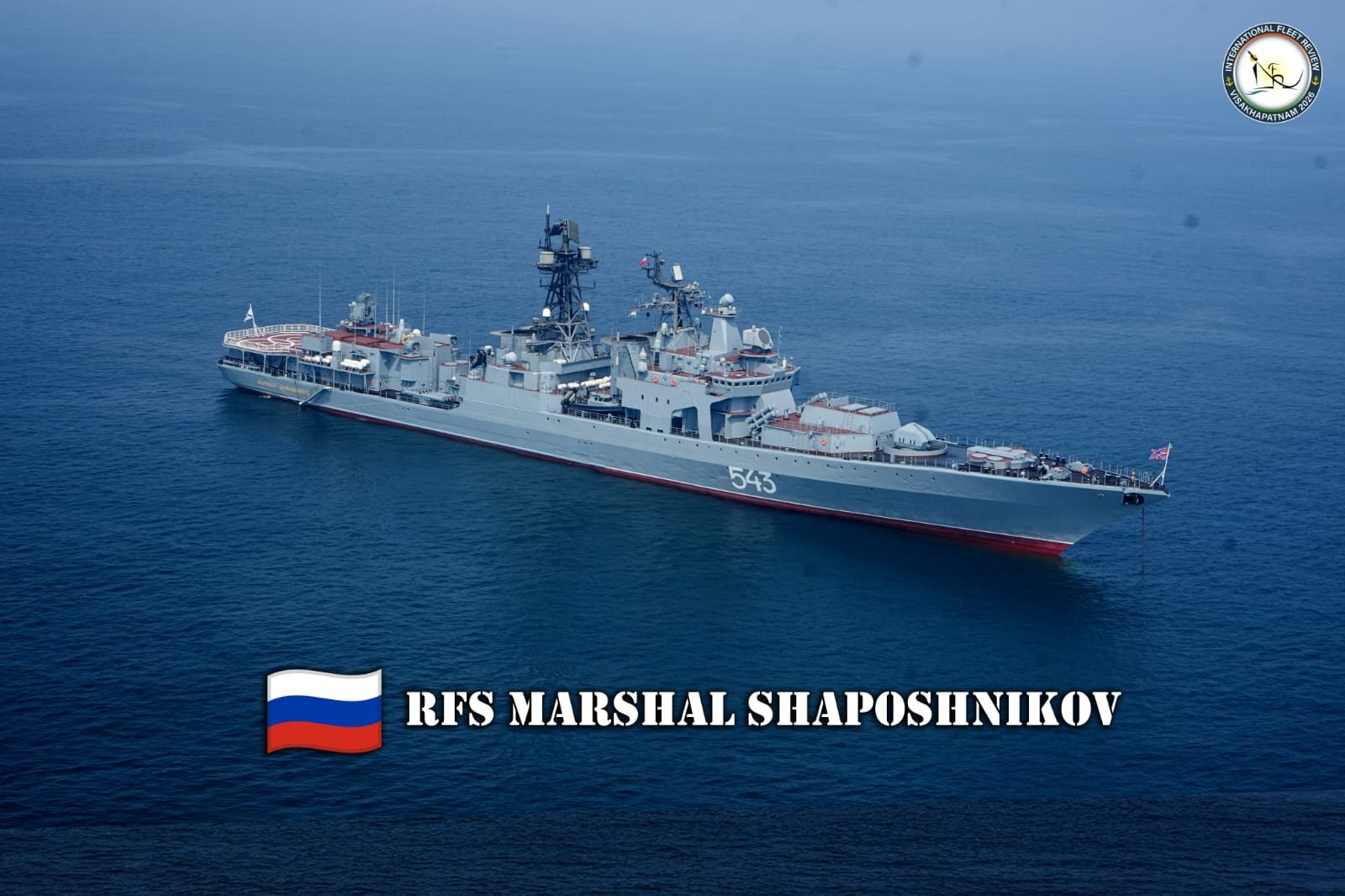
The frigate Marshal Shaposhnikov underway after modernization, new Kalibr/Oniks/Zircon VLS systems and Kh-35 installations are visible aft of the new A-190 naval gun.

In 2017 the ship received upgrades to its weapon systems and sensors. The upgrade included 16x 3S14 VLS cells for Kalibr, Oniks or Zircon cruise missiles and two 3S24 quadruple launchers for 3M24 anti-ship missiles.

On 16 February 2018, the ship caught fire at Vladivostok. All 106 crew were evacuated.

On 10 July 2020 the Marshal Shaposhnikov, being reclassified as a frigate, started sea trials after receiving upgrades.

In April 2021, she launched Kalibr missiles against a land and a naval target, located respectively at a distance of over 1,000 km and 100 km. On the same month, she was reinstated back into the active service as part of the permanent formation of the Russian Navy Pacific Fleet.

She underwent another modernization in fall 2021.

In December of 2021, Marshal Shaposhnikov launched an Otvet anti-submarine missile at a submerged target. TASS, using information from the Russian Ministry of Defense, claimed that the launch was successful and the missile struck the target.

On 21 to 23 June 2022, Marshal Shaposhnikov and the corvette Gremyashchiy visited the port of Manila in the Philippines.

On 25 June, the ships along with tanker Pechenga arrived to Cam Rahn, Vietnam. On 5 September, the destroyer took part in Vostok-2022 exercise in the Sea of Japan. On 15 September, she took part in the second Russo-Chinese joint naval patrol, along with corvettes Sovershenny, Gromky, Aldar Tsydenzhapov and tanker Pechenga.

From 21 to 27 December 2022, Marshal Shaposhnikov along with Pacific Fleet flagship Varyag, the Project 20380 corvettes Aldar Tsydenzhapov and Sovershennyy carried out joint drills in the East China Sea with the Chinese Navy.

From 4 to 6 March 2024, the ship was part of the DIMDEX 2024 in Doha, Qatar.

On 8 August 2024, the ship, along with Russian cruiser Varyag reached the Indian port of Cochin Port for replenishment.

She participated at the International Fleet Review 2026 held at Visakapatanam in India in February 2026.
