= List of ship launches in 2017 =

The list of ship launches in 2017 includes a chronological list of ships launched in 2017.

Date	Ship	Class / type	Builder	Location	Country	Notes
9 January	Cosco Shipping Himalayas	Himalayas-class container ship	Shanghai Jiangnan Changxing Shipbuilding	Shanghai	China	For China COSCO Shipping
12 January	Arklow Castle		Ferus Smit	Westerbroek	Netherlands	For Arklow Shipping
12 January	Khanderi	Scorpène-class submarine	Mazagon Dock Shipbuilders	Mumbai	India	For Indian Navy
18 January	MOL Triumph	Triumph-class container ship	Samsung Heavy Industries		South Korea	For Mitsui O.S.K. Lines
26 January	Mærsk Hong Kong	Maersk H-class container ship	Hyundai Heavy Industries		South Korea	For Maersk Line
27 January	Mein Schiff 6	Cruise ship	Meyer Turku	Turku	Finland	For TUI Cruises
January	Aviva	Yacht	Abeking & Rasmussen	Lemwerder	Germany	
January	Azalea	Ferry			Japan	For Shin Nihonkai Ferry
4 February	Bugsier 12	Tug	Bogazici	Tuzla	Turkey	For Bugsier-, Reederei- und Bergungsgesellschaft
7 February	Amadeus Provence	River cruise ship	De Hoop	Lobith	Netherlands	
9 February	Borg	"Easy Max"-type	Koninklijke Niestern Sander	Delfzijl	Netherlands	For Wagenborg Shipping
9 February	Kanuni D.S.	K20-class Dredger	Özata Shipyard	Yalova	Turkey	
17 February	Gardenia Seaways	RoRo-ferry	Flensburger Schiffbau-Gesellschaft	Flensburg	Germany	For Siem Industries
22 February	Scot Navigator	Sea-River Liner 3700	GS Yard	Waterhuizen	Netherlands	
25 February	Santos Express	Valparaiso Express-class container ship	Hyundai Samho Heavy Industries		South Korea	For Hapag-Lloyd
25 February	Munich Mærsk	Maersk Triple E class	Daewoo	Geoje	South Korea	For Maersk Line
28 February	Kronprins Haakon	icebreaker	Fincantieri	Muggiano	Italy	For Norwegian government
February	Til Abicht	launch	Feltz-Werft	Finkenwerder	Germany	For Rainer Abicht Elbreederei
February	MOL Trust	Triumph-class container ship	Samsung Heavy Industries		South Korea	For Mitsui OSK Lines
4 March	Norwegian Joy	Breakaway-Pluy-class cruise ship	Meyer Werft	Papenburg	Germany	For Norwegian Cruise Line
4 March	Federico Martinengo	FREMM multipurpose frigate	Fincantieri	Riva Trigoso	Italy	For Italian Navy
6 March	Vistula Mærsk	OMT 3600-type container ship	Cosco Zhoushan Shipyard		China	For Seago Line
9 March	Symphony Provider	Ferus Smit Ecobox	Ferus Smit	Leer	Germany	For Symphony Shipping BV
10 March	Carnival Horizon	Vista-class cruise ship	Fincantieri	Marghrera	Italy	For Carnival Cruise Line
16 March	Tulsa	Independence-class littoral combat ship	Austal USA	Mobile, Alabama	United States	For United States Navy
20 March	El Coquí	Commitment-class ConRo-ship	VT Halter Marine	Pascagoula	United States	For Crowley Marine
24 March	Bibby Wavemaster 1	service vessel	Damen Group	Galaţi	Romania	For Bibby Line Group
25 March	Palmetto State	ECO-class tanker	General Dynamics NASSCO		United States	For American Petroleum Tankers
30 March	Audaz	Buque de Acción Marítima	Navantia	San Fernando, Cádiz	Spain	For Armada Española
31 March	Arklow Vanguard		Royal Bodewes	Hoogezand	Netherlands	For Arklow Shipping
March	Aurora	yacht	Lürssen	Rendsburg	Germany	
1 April	OOCL Germany	G-class container ship	Samsung Heavy Industries		South Korea	For OOCL sister ship of OOCL Hong Kong
7 April	Arklow Clan		Ferus Smit	Westerbroek	Netherlands	
7 April	Iceni Legend	Crew transfer vessel	Alicat Workboats Ltd.	Great Yarmouth	United Kingdom	For Iceni Marine Services Ltd.
7 April	Polar Mexico	Polar-class refrigated container ship	Jiangsu New Yangzi Shipbuilding		China	
7 April	Xinyangzi 237	Polar-class refrigated container ship	Jiangsu New Yangzi Shipbuilding		China	
8 April	Moscow Mærsk	Maersk Triple E class	Daewoo	Geoje	South Korea	For Maersk Line
25 April	Pisco	Multipurpose	SIMA	Lima	Peru	For Peruvian Navy
26 April		Type 001A aircraft carrier		Dalian	China	For People's Liberation Army Navy
28 April	Audacious	Astute-class submarine	BAE Systems Maritime – Submarines	Barrow-in-Furness	United Kingdom	For Royal Navy
April	Project Thunder	Yacht	Lürssen	Lemwerder	Germany	
April	Project Sasha	Yacht	Lürssen	Rendsburg	Germany	
April	SK 37	28-meter-class Lifeboat (rescue)	Fassmer	Berne	Germany	For DGzRS
1 May	Tripoli	America-class amphibious assault ship	Huntington Ingalls Industries	Pascagoula, Mississippi	United States	For United States Navy
1 May	Mærsk Horsburgh	Maersk H-class container ship	Hyundai Heavy Industries		South Korea	For Maersk Line
12 May	Mærsk Honam	Maersk H-class container ship	Hyundai Heavy Industries		South Korea	For Maersk Line
13 May	Milan Mærsk	Maersk Triple E class	Daewoo	Geoje	South Korea	For Maersk Line
16 May	Ivan Khurs	Yury Ivanov-class intelligence ship		Saint Petersburg	Russia	For Russian Navy
24 May	Rheinland-Pfalz	F125-class frigate		Hamburg	Germany	
26 May	Groix	Ferry	Lanester	Kership	France	
28 May	OOCL Japan	G-class container ship	Samsung Heavy Industries		South Korea	For OOCL sister ship of OOCL Hong Kong
1 June	Loire	BSAH	Piriou	Concarneau	France	For French Navy
2 June		coast patrol vessel	Brodosplit	Split	Croatia	For Croatian Navy
2 June	Jules Verne 2	river shuttle	Navalu de Bouin	Nantes	France	For Semitan
5 June	Indochine II	river cruise ship	Triyards	Ho Chi Minh City	Vietnam	For CroisiEurope
6 June	Volga Mærsk	OMT 3600-type container ship	Cosco Zhoushan Shipyard		China	For Seago Line
9 June	Symphony of the Seas	Oasis-class cruise ship	STX France	Saint Nazaire	France	For Royal Caribbean International
9 June	Tulipa Seaways	RoRo-ferry	Flensburger Schiffbau-Gesellschaft	Flensburg	Germany	For DFDS
9 June	MOL Truth	Triumph-class container ship	Imabari Shipbuilding	Saijō, Ehime	Japan	For Shoei Kisen Kaisha sister ship of MOL Triumph
9 June	Indiana	Virginia-class submarine	Huntington Ingalls Industries	Newport News	United States	For United States Navy
10 June	Flying Clipper	sailing vessel	Brodosplit	Split	Croatia	For Star Clippers
14 June	National Geographic Quest	expedition vessel	Nichols Brothers Boat Builders	Whidbey Island	United States	
16 June	Arklow Venture		Royal Bodewes	Hoogezand	Netherlands	For Arklow Shipping
16 June	Cosco Shipping Taurus	Constellation-class container ship	Shanghai Waigaogiao Shipbuilding		China	For China COSCO Shipping Corporation
16 June	Mærsk Hidalgo	Maersk H-class container ship	Hyundai Heavy Industries		South Korea	For Maersk Line
17 June	Monaco Mærsk	Maersk Triple E class	Daewoo	Geoje	South Korea	For Maersk Line
23 June	Trang	River-class patrol vessel	Bangkok Dock Company		Thailand	For Royal Thai Navy
26 June	Cosco Shipping Kilimanjaro	Himalayas-class container ship	Shanghai Jiangnan Changxing Shipbuilding	Shanghai	China	For China COSCO Shipping
28 June		Type 055 (Renhai) guided missile destroyer	Dalian Shipbuilding Industry Company	Jiangnan Shipyard	China	For People's Liberation Army Navy
30 June	Arklow Cliff		Ferus Smit	Westerbroek	Netherlands	For Arklow Shipping
June	Gremyashchiy	Gremyashchiy-class corvette	Severnaya Verf	Saint Petersburg	Russia	For Russian Navy
1 July	Billings	Freedom-class littoral combat ship	Lockheed Martin		United States	For United States Navy
4 July	Makai	Sailing yacht	HanseYachts	Greifswald	Germany	
5 July	Andrey Vilkitsky	ice breaker	Vyborg Shipyard		Russia	
6 July		Project ROB07 oil barge	Nobel Brothers Shipyard		Russia	For JSC Lena United River Shipping Company
8 July	OOCL United Kingdom	G-class container ship	Samsung Heavy Industries		South Korea	For OOCL sister ship of OOCL Hong Kong
10 July	New Frontiers	yacht	Gorinchem	Damen	Netherlands	
10 July	Vayenga Mærsk	OMT 3600-type container ship	Cosco Zhoushan Shipyard		China	For Seago Line
17 July	Polar Ecuador	Polar-class refrigated container ship	Jiangsu New Yangzi Shipbuilding		China	For Hamburg Süd
17 July	Polar Costa Rica	Polar-class refrigerated container ship	Jiangsu New Yangzi Shipbuilding		China	For Hamburg Süd
18 July	Marseille Mærsk	Maersk Triple E class	Daewoo	Geoje	South Korea	For Maersk Line
24 July	Thjelvar	Ferry	GSI Shipyard	Guangzhou	China	For Destination Gotland
25 July		Naval offshore patrol vessel	Reliance Defence and Engineering	Pipavav	India	For Indian Navy
25 July		Naval offshore patrol vessel	Reliance Defence and Engineering	Pipavav	India	For Indian Navy
25 July		solar passenger ship	Formstaal/Ostseestaal	Stralsund	Germany	For Weiße Flotte
28 July	Cosco Shipping Alps	Himalayas-class container ship	Shanghai Jiangnan Changxing Shipbuilding	Shanghai	China	For China COSCO Shipping
1 August	Orca ten Broke	solar passenger ship	Formstaal/Ostseestaal	Stralsund	Germany	
5 August	Venta Mærsk	OMT 3600-type container ship	Cosco Zhoushan Shipyard		China	For Seago Line
7 August	Kisogawa	Oil tanker	Nantong Cosco KHI Ship Engineering Co		China	For Kawasaki Kisen Kaisha
19 August	CMA CGM Antoine de Saint Exupery	Antoine de Saint Exupery-class container ship	Hanjin Heavy Industries	Subic Bay Freeport Zone	Philippines	For CMA CGM
23 August	MSC Seaview	Seaside-class cruise ship	Fincantieri	Monfalcone	Italy	For MSC Cruises
23 August	Medway	River-class patrol vessel	BAE Systems	Scotstoun	United Kingdom	For Royal Navy
25 August	Symphony Spirit	Ferus Smit Ecobox	Ferus Smit	Leer	Germany	For Symphony Shipping BV
26 August	World Dream	cruise ship	Meyer Werft	Papenburg	Germany	For Dream Cruises#
27 August	OOCL Scandinavia	G-class container ship	Samsung Heavy Industries		South Korea	For OOCL sister ship of OOCL Hong Kong
August	Flotagen	Floating wind turbine	Bouygues	Saint Nazaire	France	
1 September	Seabourn Ovation	Cruise ship	Fincantieri	Sestri Ponente	Italy	For Seabourn Cruise Line
1 September	Mærsk Hanoi	Maersk H-class container ship	Hyundai Heavy Industries		South Korea	For Maersk Line
7 September	Fadiq	RoRo-ferry	Flensburger Schiffbau-Gesellschaft	Flensburg	Germany	For Alternative Transport
14 September		Yacht	Lürssen	Lemwerder	Germany	
15 September	Delbert D. Black	Arleigh Burke-class destroyer	Huntington Ingalls Industries	Pascagoula, Mississippi	United States	For United States Navy
18 September	Manchester Mærsk	Maersk Triple E class	Daewoo	Geoje	South Korea	For Maersk Line
19 September	MOL Treasure	Triumph-class container ship	Imabari Shipbuilding	Marugame	Japan	For Shoei Kisen Kaisha sister ship of MOL Triumph
21 September	Bara Breizh	Fish trawler	Gléhen	Douarnenez	France	For Armement Bigouden SA
22 September	Mærsk Hangzhou	Maersk H-class container ship	Hyundai Heavy Industries		South Korea	For Maersk Line
28 September	Polar Argentina	Polar-class refrigated container ship	Jiangsu New Yangzi Shipbuilding		China	
28 September	Polar Chile	Polar-class refrigated container ship	Jiangsu New Yangzi Shipbuilding		China	
29 September	Mein Schiff 1	Cruise ship	Meyer Turku	Turku	Finland	For TUI Cruises
29 September	Yuang He Hai	valemax	Shanghai Waigaoqiao Shipbuilding	Shanghai	China	For China COSCO Shipping Corporation
September	Justice	Littoral Mission Vessel	Singapore Technologies Marine	Singapore	Singapore	For Republic of Singapore Navy
September	Marco Polo	Caissonnier	Bouygues	Marseille	France	For Project Anse du Portier/Monaco
11 October	Elbe Princess II	river cruise ship		Saint-Nazaire	France	For CroisiEurope
18 October	Cosco Shipping Gemini	Constellation-class container ship	Dalian Shipbuilding	Dalian	China	For China COSCO Shipping Corporation
20 October	Cosco Shipping Virgo	Constellation-class container ship	Shanghai Waigaogiao Shipbuilding		China	For China COSCO Shipping Corporation
20 October	Sankta Maria II	electric ferry	Formstaal	Stralsund	Germany	
21 October	Snow Crystal		Ferus Smit	Westerbroek	Netherlands	For Erik Thun AB
21 October	OOCL Indonesia	G-class container ship	Samsung Heavy Industries		South Korea	For Orient Overseas Container Line sister ship of OOCL Hong Kong
27 October	Cosco Shipping Denali	Himalayas-class container ship	Shanghai Jiangnan Changxing Shipbuilding	Shanghai	China	For China COSCO Shipping
28 October	Vuoksi Mærsk	OMT 3600-type container ship	Cosco Zhoushan Shipyard		China	For Seago Line
October		Type "Long Island 85" catamaran	JFA Yachts	Concarneau	France	
	Rose de Cascia	Fishing trawler		Dieppe	France	For Scopale
30 October	Arklow Venus	Cargo ship	Royal Bodewes	Hoogezand	Netherlands	For Arklow Shipping Rotterdam
4 November	Ever Golden	Evergreen G-class container ship	Imabari Shipbuilding	Saijo	Japan	For Evergreen Marine
4 November	Murcia Mærsk	Maersk Triple E class	Daewoo	Geoje	South Korea	For Maersk Line
21 November	Glen Sannox	LNG & MD ferry	Ferguson Marine	Port Glasgow	United Kingdom	For Caledonian MacBrayne
30 November	Kronos	Trawler	Gléhen	Douarnenez	France	
November	Iceni Defender	Crew transfer vessel	Alicat Workboats Ltd.	Great Yarmouth	United Kingdom	For Iceni Marine Services Ltd.
November		Electric ship	Guangzhou Shipyard International Company	Guangzhou	China	
2 December	Manila Mærsk	Maersk Triple E class	Daewoo	Geoje	South Korea	For Maersk Line
2 December	Mumbai Mærsk	Maersk Triple E class	Daewoo	Geoje	South Korea	For Maersk Line
2 December	Pacific Unity	Valemax	Shanghai WaiGaoQiao Shipbuilding	Shanghai	China	For China Merchants Energy Shipping
4 December	Taíno	Commitment-class ConRo-ship	VT Halter Marine	Pascagoula	United States	For Crowley Marine
4 December	Polar Peru	Polar-class refrigated container ship	Jiangsu New Yangzi Shipbuilding		China	
6 December	MS Nieuw Statendam	Pinnacle-class cruise ship	Fincantieri	Marghera	Italy	For Holland America Line
8 December	Sir John Franklin	halieutic research vessel	Seaspan Shipyard	Vancouver	Canada	
9 December	Husavik	Ferry	Cemre Shipyard		Turkey	For Fjord 1
11 December	Pacific Prosperity	Valemax	China Merchants Heavy Industry	Jiangsu	China	For China Merchants Energy Shipping
15 December	CMA CGM Jean Mermoz	Antoine de Saint Exupery-class container ship	Hanjin Heavy Industries	Subic Bay Freeport Zone	Philippines	For CMA CGM
18 December	Silver Tiara	ferry	Naikai Zosen Setoda Works	Setoda, Ikuchijima	Japan	
18 December		Ferry	Cemre Shipyard		Turkey	For Fjord 1
18 December	Le Lapérouse	Cruise ship	VARD	Tulcea	Romania	For Compagnie du Ponant
21 December	Prince of Wales	Queen Elizabeth-class aircraft carrier	Aircraft Carrier Alliance	Rosyth	United Kingdom	For Royal Navy
25 December	Cosco Shipping Universe	Universe-class container ship	Shanghai Waigaogiao Shipbuilding		China	For China COSCO Shipping Corporation
Unknown date	Croi Na Farraige	Workboat	Arklow Marine Services Inc.	Arklow	Ireland	For Marine Harvest Ireland.
Unknown date	Diligent Joe	Fishing trawler	Arklow Marine Services Inc.	Arklow	Ireland	For R. & B. Fishing Ltd.
Unknown date	Forth Hope	Ferry	David Abels Boatbuilders Ltd.	Bristol	United Kingdom	For Vine Trust.
Unknown date	Iceni Challenger	Crew transfer vessel	Alicat Workboats Ltd.	Great Yarmouth	United Kingdom	For Iceni Marine Services Ltd.
Unknown date	MO4	Crew transfer vessel	Aluminium Marine Consultants Ltd.	Cowes	United Kingdom	For Mainprize Offshore Ltd.
