= Russian ship Gremyashchy =

Gremyashchy (Russian: Гремящий; lit. "thunderous"; alternate spellings Gremyashchiy, Gremyaschi, and Gremyashchi) can refer to a number of Russian or Soviet warships:

- Russian frigate Gremyashchy, a steam frigate of the Imperial Russian Navy Baltic Fleet
- Russian corvette Gremyashchy (1822) (ru), an Imperial Russian Navy corvette
- Russian gunboat Gremyashchy (ru), an Imperial Russian Navy gunboat commissioned in 1893
- Soviet destroyer Gremyashchy (1937), a Soviet Navy Gnevny-class destroyer and one of the most famous Soviet destroyers of World War II
- Soviet destroyer Gremyashchy (1959) (ru), a Soviet Navy Kanin-class destroyer
- Soviet destroyer Gremyashchy (1987) (ru), a Soviet Navy Sovremenny-class destroyer
- Russian destroyer Gremyashchy (1989) (ru), a Russian Navy Sovremenny-class destroyer, formerly Bezuderzhny
- Russian corvette Gremyashchiy (ru), a Russian Navy Gremyashchiy-class corvette commissioned in 2020
