= Soviet destroyer Gremyashchiy =

Gremyashchiy (Russian: Гремящий; lit. "thunderous"; alternate spellings Gremyashchy, Gremyaschi, and Gremyashchi) can refer to a number of Soviet warships:

- Soviet destroyer Gremyashchiy (1937), a Soviet Navy Gnevny-class destroyer and one of the most famous Soviet destroyers of World War II
- Soviet destroyer Gremyashchiy (1959) (ru), a Soviet Navy Kanin-class destroyer
- Soviet destroyer Gremyashchiy (1987) (ru), a Soviet Navy Sovremennyy-class destroyer
- Soviet destroyer Gremyashchiy (1990) (ru), a Soviet Navy Sovremennyy-class destroyer

== See also ==
- Russian ship Gremyashchy - ships of other Russian navies
