= MV SSG Edward A. Carter Jr. =

LTC John U.D. Page-class dry cargo ship

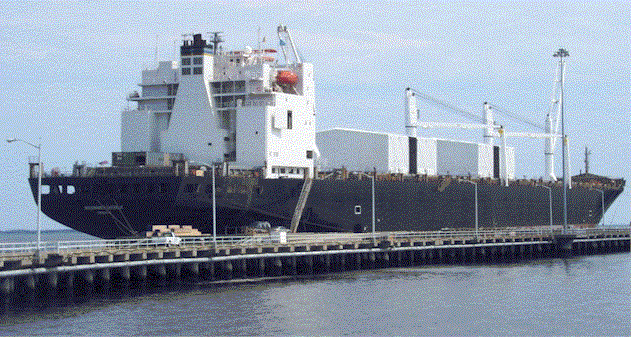
- MV SSG Edward A. Carter Jr.

History

United States
- Name: SSG Edward A. Carter Jr.
- Namesake: Edward A. Carter Jr.
- Owner: United States Lines (1985–1988); Nedlloyd (1988–1993); OOCL Hong Kong (1993–2000); Sea-Land Service (2000–2001); Maersk Line (2001–2010s)
- Builder: Daewoo Shipbuilding
- Launched: 30 December 1984
- Completed: 1985
- Commissioned: 2001
- Out of service: 2016
- Renamed: American Nebraska (1985–1986); Susan C (1986–1988); Nebraska (1988); Nedlloyd Hudson (1988–1993); OOCL Innovation (1993–2000); Sealand Oregon (2000–2001)
- Identification: IMO number: 8212673; MMSI number: 367015000; Call sign: WDDU; Hull number: AK-4544
- Fate: Scrapped 2016

General characteristics
- Class & type: LTC John U.D. Page-class cargo ship
- Displacement: 74,500 t (73,323 long tons), full
- Length: 949 ft 8 in (289.46 m)
- Beam: 105 ft 9 in (32.23 m)
- Draft: 35 ft 0 in (10.67 m)
- Propulsion: 1 × Sulzer 7-cyl. diesel engine
- Speed: 18 knots (33 km/h; 21 mph)
- Capacity: 4,614 TEU
- Complement: 21 mariners
- Aviation facilities: Helipad

MV SSG Edward A. Carter Jr. (AK-4544) was the second ship of the LTC John U.D. Page-class cargo ship built in 1985. The ship is named after Sergeant First Class Edward A. Carter Jr., an American soldier who was awarded the Medal of Honor during World War II.

== Construction and commissions ==
The ship was built in 1985 at the Daewoo Shipyard, Koje, Yeongnam. She was put into the service of United States Lines as American Nebraska, Susan C and Nebraska from 1985 until the company's bankruptcy in 1986.

Nedlloyd later acquired the ship in 1988 and put in service as Nedlloyd Hudson until 2000.

OOCL Hong Kong bought the ship and operated her as OOCL Innovation from 2000 until 2001. In which she was acquired by Sea-Land Service and commissioned for a year as Sealand Oregon.

On 1 March 2001, the ship was chartered by the Maersk Line for the Military Sealift Command and was put into the Prepositioning Program and the Maritime Prepositioning Ship Squadron 2 as MV SSG Edward A. Carter Jr. (AK-4544) on 13 June 2001.
