= Soviet destroyer Provornyy =

Provornyy (also spelled Provorny or Provorniy) is the name of the following ships of the Soviet Navy:

- Soviet destroyer Provornyy (1946), a Type 1936A destroyer acquired from Germany, scrapped in 1962
- Soviet destroyer Provornyy (1962), a Kashin-class destroyer in commission 1964–1990

== See also ==
- Russian corvette Provornyy, launched in 2019
