= Edward A. Carter Jr. =

United States Army Medal of Honor recipient (1916–1963)

Edward Allen Carter Jr.
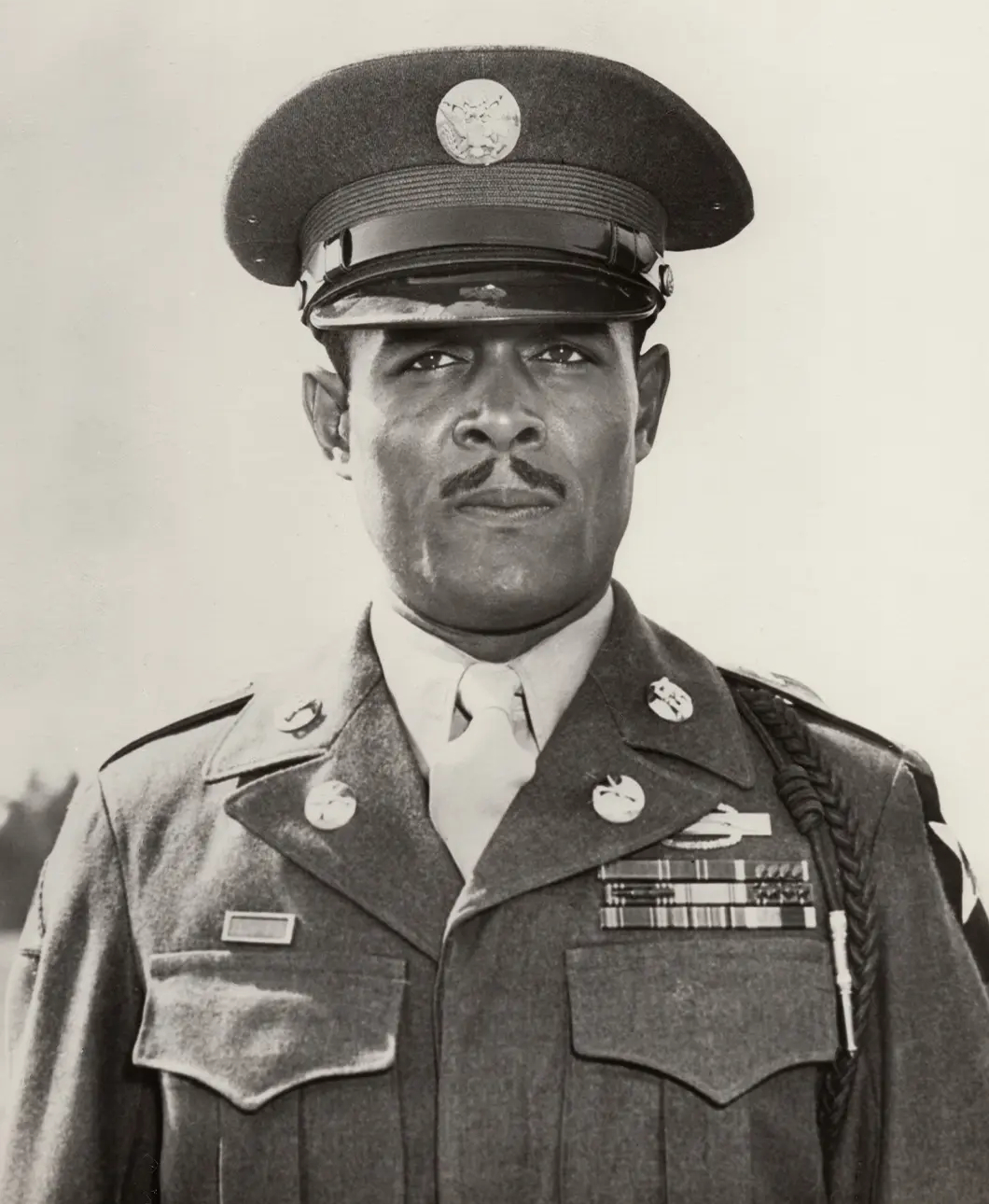
- Carter c. 1945
- Born: Edward Allen Carter Jr. May 26, 1916; Los Angeles, California, U.S.
- Died: January 30, 1963 (aged 46); Los Angeles, California, U.S.
- Burial place: Arlington National Cemetery
- Military career
- Allegiance: Republic of China; Republic of Spain; United States
- Branch: National Revolutionary Army; International Brigades; United States Army
- Service years: 1932, 1937–1938, 1941–1949
- Rank: Sergeant first class
- Units: Abraham Lincoln Brigade 12th Armored Division: 56th Armored Infantry
- Military awards: Medal of Honor; Bronze Star Medal; Purple Heart
- Conflicts: Shanghai Incident; Spanish Civil War; World War II; Western Allied invasion of Germany
- Other work: Rubber tire manufacturing worker (1949–1963)

Edward Allen Carter Jr. (May 26, 1916 – January 30, 1963) was a United States Army sergeant first class who was wounded in action during World War II. He was posthumously awarded the Medal of Honor, the nation's highest military decoration for valor, for his actions on March 23, 1945, near Speyer, Germany.

Carter and six other black Americans who served in World War II were awarded the Medal of Honor on January 12, 1997. The seven recipients are the first and only black American soldiers to be awarded the Medal of Honor for World War II.

== Early years ==
Carter was born in Los Angeles, California, in 1916. He was the son of missionary parents. His father Edward Allen Carter, Sr. was African-American. His mother, Mary Albert, was born to an English father and a Bengali mother in Kolkata, India. Carter grew up in India and then moved to Shanghai, China. He was fluent in 4 languages: English, Hindi, German and Mandarin.

== Military career ==
=== China and Spain ===
While in Shanghai in 1932, Carter ran away from home and joined the National Revolutionary Army, fighting against the invading Japanese during the Shanghai Incident. After reaching the rank of Lieutenant, he had to leave when it was discovered that he lied about his age and he was actually 15 years old. He eventually made his way to Spain and joined the Abraham Lincoln Brigade, an American volunteer unit supporting the Spanish Republicans, in their fight against the Nationalists during the Spanish Civil War.

=== World War II ===
Carter entered the U.S. Army on September 26, 1941. As a result of his previous combat experience, he stood out among the other recruits. In less than a year, he achieved the rank of staff sergeant. Carter was part of the 56th Armored Infantry Battalion of the 12th Armored Division.

Provisional platoons of African-American troops were established in the wake of the Battle of the Bulge, which took place during the winter of 1944–1945. Black support and combat-support soldiers were allowed to volunteer for combat duty, and were given brief training in small-unit tactics. Formed into provisional units, they were used to augment depleted divisions. Soldiers volunteering for this combat duty had to surrender their current rank. When the provisional companies were set up, Carter volunteered and went from staff sergeant to private.

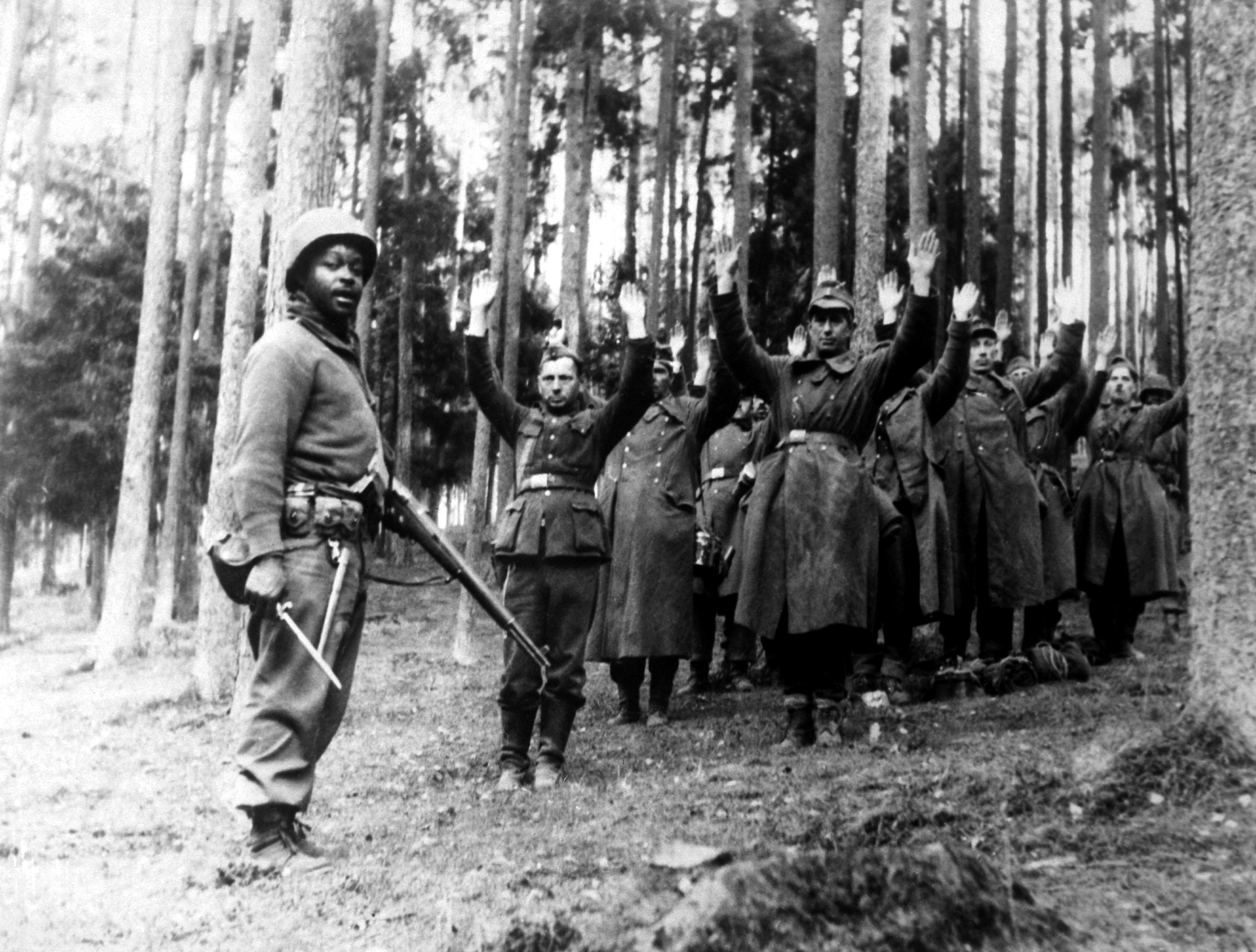
A soldier of the 12th Armored Division standing guard over a group of German POWs, April 1945

On March 23, 1945, Carter, then a 28-year-old infantry staff sergeant, was riding on a tank when it was hit by a Panzerschreck. Dismounted, Carter led three soldiers across an open field. In the process, two of the men were killed and the other seriously wounded. Carter continued on alone and was wounded five times, before being forced to take cover.

Eight German soldiers tried to capture him, but he killed six and captured the remaining two. He used the two as human shields from enemy fire as he recrossed the field. His prisoners provided valuable information on enemy troop dispositions for his unit. For this, he was awarded the Distinguished Service Cross on October 4, 1945, and later promoted to sergeant first class.

Carter was refused re-enlistment in the Army in 1949, due to allegations that he had communist contacts and allegiances, related to his affiliation with the Abraham Lincoln Brigade in Spain, and a "Welcome Home Joe" dinner. He died of lung cancer—attributed to shrapnel remaining in his neck—on January 30, 1963. Carter was buried at Los Angeles National Cemetery. He was re-interred at Arlington National Cemetery in 1997.

== Personal life ==
He married Mildred Hoover in 1940. Together they had two sons, Edward III, born March 27, 1941, and William, born 1944.

== Awards and decorations ==
Carter's awards and decorations include:

MV SSG Edward A. Carter Jr. (T-AK 4544), a Navy container ship of the Military Sealift Command, was named after Carter.

=== Medal of Honor ===
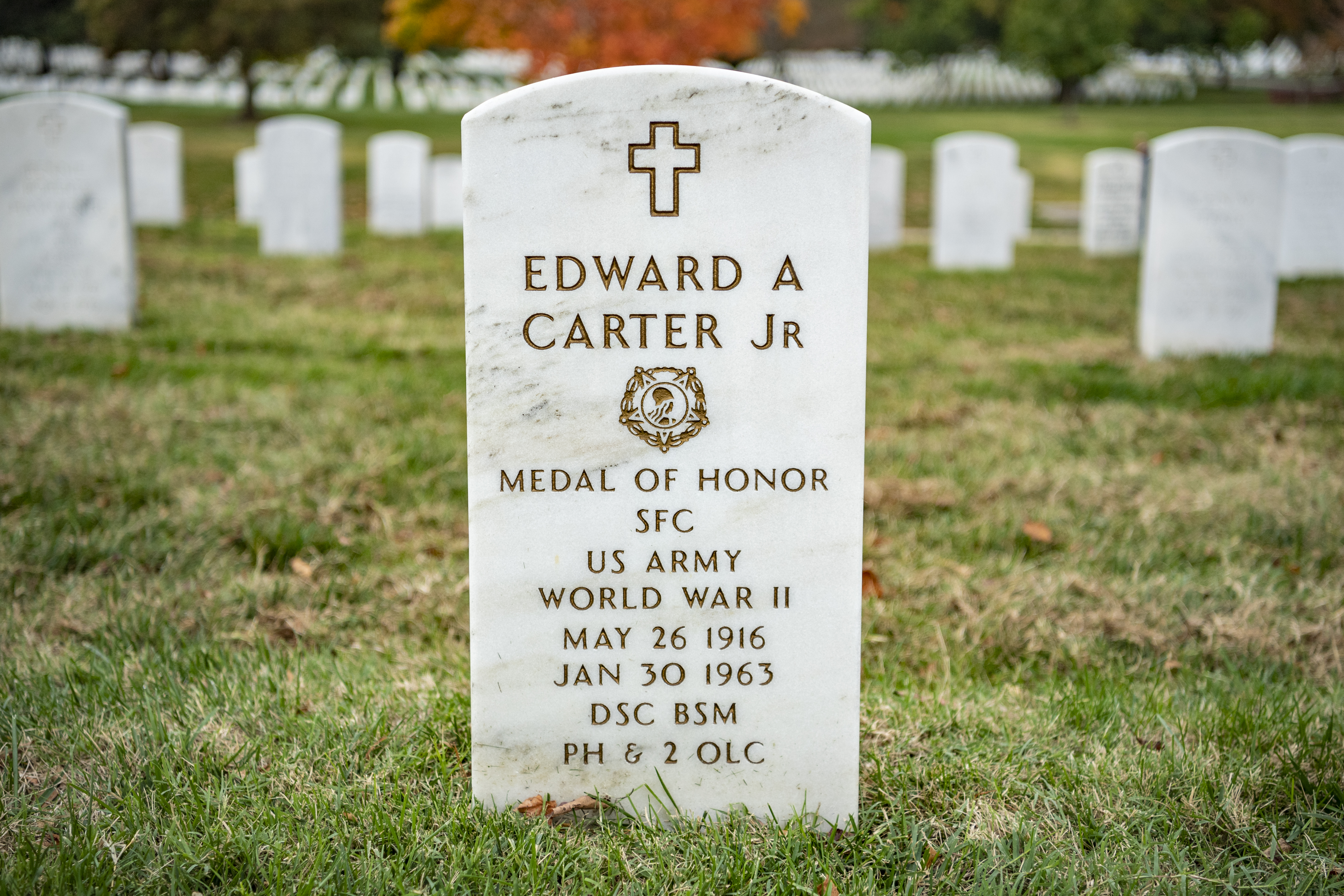
Carter's grave at Arlington

In the early 1990s, it was determined that black soldiers had been denied consideration for the Medal of Honor in World War II on grounds of their race. In 1993, the Army contracted Shaw University in Raleigh, North Carolina, to research and determine if there was racial disparity in the review process for recipients of the Medal of Honor. A study commissioned by the Army described systematic racial discrimination in the criteria for awarding decorations during World War II.

In 1996, after an exhaustive review of files, the study recommended that ten black Americans who served in World War II be awarded the Medal of Honor. In October of that year, Congress passed legislation that would allow the Medal of Honor to be passed to seven out of the ten former soldiers. The Medal of Honor was given to Carter's son, the descendants of the other five black Americans, and the only still-living recipient, Vernon Baker, on January 12, 1997. Out of the seven, six had their Distinguished Service Crosses revoked and upgraded.

==== Citation ====
The president of the United States in the name of the Congress takes pride in presenting the Medal of Honor posthumously to:

Staff Sergeant Edward A. Carter Jr., United States Army

For conspicuous gallantry and intrepidity at the risk of his own life above and beyond the call of duty in action on 23 March 1945. At approximately 0830 hours, 23 March 1945, near Speyer, Germany, the tank upon which Staff Sergeant Carter was riding received bazooka and small arms fire from the vicinity of a large warehouse to its left front. Staff Sergeant Carter and his squad took cover behind an intervening road bank. Staff Sergeant Carter volunteered to lead a three-man patrol to the warehouse where other unit members noticed the original bazooka fire. From here they were to ascertain the location and strength of the opposing position and advance approximately 150 yards across an open field. Enemy small arms fire covered this field. As the patrol left this covered position, they received intense enemy small arms fire killing one member of the patrol instantly. This caused Staff Sergeant Carter to order the other two members of the patrol to return to the covered position and cover him with rifle fire while he proceeded alone to carry out the mission. The enemy fire killed one of the two soldiers while they were returning to the covered position, and seriously wounded the remaining soldier before he reached the covered position.

An enemy machine gun burst wounded Staff Sergeant Carter three times in the left arm as he continued the advance. He continued and received another wound in his left leg that knocked him from his feet. As Staff Sergeant Carter took wound tablets and drank from his canteen, the enemy shot it from his left hand, with the bullet going through his hand. Disregarding these wounds, Staff Sergeant Carter continued the advance by crawling until he was within thirty yards of his objective. The enemy fire became so heavy that Staff Sergeant Carter took cover behind a bank and remained there for approximately two hours. Eight enemy riflemen approached Staff Sergeant Carter, apparently to take him prisoner. Staff Sergeant Carter killed six of the enemy soldiers and captured the remaining two. These two enemy soldiers later gave valuable information concerning the number and disposition of enemy troops. Staff Sergeant Carter refused evacuation until he had given full information about what he had observed and learned from the captured enemy soldiers. This information greatly facilitated the advance on Speyer. Staff Sergeant Carter’s extraordinary heroism was an inspiration to the officers and men of the 7th Army, Infantry Company Number 1 (Provisional) and exemplify the highest traditions of the military service.

== See also ==
- Vernon Baker
- John R. Fox
- Willy F. James Jr.
- Ruben Rivers
- Charles L. Thomas
- George Watson
- List of African-American Medal of Honor recipients
- List of Medal of Honor recipients for World War II
- Medal of Honor (TV series), Carter is featured in Season 1, Episode 3
