= Russian corvette Provornyy =

Gremyashchiy-class corvette of the Russian Navy

History

Russia
- Name: Provornyy; (Проворный)
- Namesake: Provornyy
- Builder: Severnaya Verf, Saint Petersburg
- Laid down: 25 July 2013
- Launched: November 2019 (initial); 18 June 2024 (post-repair)
- Commissioned: 2026?
- Home port: Vladivostok
- Status: Fitting out as of mid-2024; severe fire damage in December 2021; rebuilt and may join the fleet in 2026

General characteristics
- Class & type: Gremyashchiy-class corvette
- Displacement: 2,500 tons
- Length: 106.0 m (347.8 ft)
- Beam: 13 m (42.7 ft)
- Draught: 5 m (16.4 ft)
- Installed power: AC 380/220 V, 50 Hz, 4 × 630 kW diesel genset
- Propulsion: 2 shaft CODAD, 4 Kolomna 16D49 diesels 23,664 hp (17.6 MW)
- Speed: 27 knots (50 km/h; 31 mph)
- Range: 4,000 nmi (7,400 km; 4,600 mi) at 14 knots (26 km/h; 16 mph)
- Endurance: ?
- Complement: 100
- Sensors & processing systems: Air search radar: Multi-purpose AESA naval radar mast/system "Zaslon"; Fire control radar: 5P-10 Puma for A-190 100 mm artillery; Sonar: Zarya-M bow mounted. Vinyetka low frequency active/passive towed array
- Electronic warfare & decoys: EW Suite: TK-25-5; Countermeasures: 4 × PK-10
- Armament: 1 × 100 mm A-190 Arsenal naval gun; 1 × 8 UKSK VLS cells for Kalibr, Oniks, Medvedka or Zircon anti-ship/cruise missiles; 2 × 8 VLS cells Redut; 2 × AK-630M CIWS; 2 × Paket-NK 324 mm quad torpedo tubes for anti-torpedo/anti-submarine torpedoes; 2 × 14.5 mm MTPU pedestal machine guns
- Aviation facilities: Helipad and hangar for Kamov Ka-27 helicopter

Provornyy is a Gremyashchiy-class corvette of the Russian Navy.

== Development and design ==
Gremyashchiy-class corvettes are very large multipurpose vessels, designed to complement the Steregushchiy class already being commissioned with the Russian Navy. They have been designed to have an improved habitability for higher endurance missions, and are able to launch cruise missiles.

The class was designed with German MTU diesels for propulsion. However, because of sanctions arising from the Russo-Ukrainian war, deliveries of MTU diesels beyond the first two units were stopped, resulting in the cancellation of further units. Instead, new units of the preceding Steregushchiy class are being ordered. In May 2016, corvette Gremyashchiy got two Russian-made 16D49 diesel turbines 1DDA-12000 from Kolomna Plant in St Petersburg, replacing the previously required German MTU diesels.

Project 20385 differs from its predecessor by greater dimensions and displacement. They have a steel hull and composite superstructure, with a bulbous bow and nine watertight subdivisions. Compared with the Soobrazitelny, Boikiy, Sovershennyy and Stoikiy ships, which are fitted with Redut air defense VLS system of 12 launchers on the bow, these new ships are equipped with a UKSK VLS system comprising eight launchers for either Kalibr, Oniks or Zircon anti-ship/cruise missiles. The Redut VLS system with 16 launchers has been placed on the stern. Another difference is the lack of the aft mast above the helicopter hangar, and single integrated mainmast that no longer includes separate open shelves for artillery and navigation radars.

== Construction and career ==
Provornyy was laid down on 25 July 2013, and launched in November 2019 by Severnaya Verf in Saint Petersburg. The transfer of the corvette to the fleet had been scheduled for the end of 2022. The ship will become part of the Joint Forces Command in northeastern Russia and will be based in Kamchatka.

On 17 December 2021, Provornyy caught fire while being fitted out at Severnaya Verf, St. Petersburg. Nearly 170 firefighters were dispatched to deal with the incident, and it is reported that the fire covered almost the entire deck of the corvette. Three construction workers have been injured, with two of them being hospitalised. However, no fatalities have been reported, and there was no construction occurring at the time of the fire. Despite the fire's scale and intensity, the hull of Provornyy was not damaged. The destroyed superstructure, which will be dismantled, did not contain any equipment. Severnaya Verf has stated that they are conducting negotiations to build a new superstructure. It was subsequently reported that a rebuild of the ship might take five years.

At the Neva-2023 exhibition, the head of Severnaya Verf stated that all damaged hull sections of Provornyy have been restored, and the ship was planned to be relaunched by May 2024. The corvette was re-launched in June 2024 and had been projected to possibly join the fleet by the end of 2025. However, as of the end of 2025 further progress had not yet been reported.
