= Russian corvette Gremyashchiy =

Gremyashchiy-class corvette of the Russian Navy

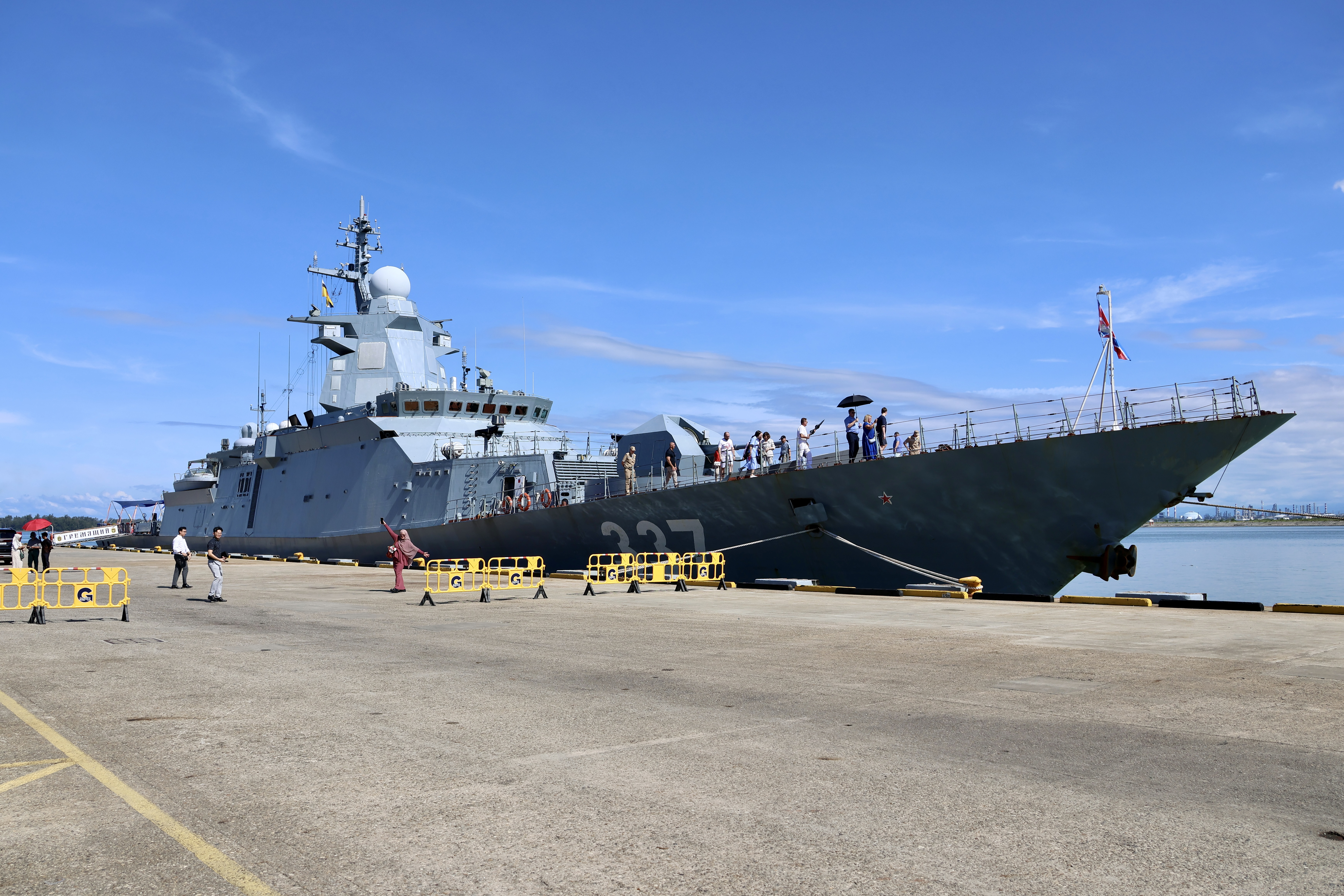
- Gremyashchiy moored at Muara Port in 2025

History

Russia
- Name: Gremyashchiy; (Гремящий)
- Namesake: Soviet destroyer Gremyashchy (1937)
- Builder: Severnaya Verf, Saint Petersburg
- Laid down: 1 February 2012
- Launched: 30 June 2017
- Commissioned: 29 December 2020
- Home port: Petropavlovsk-Kamchatsky
- Identification: Pennant number: 337
- Status: Active

General characteristics
- Class & type: Gremyashchiy-class corvette
- Displacement: 2,500 tons
- Length: 106.0 m (347.8 ft)
- Beam: 13 m (42.7 ft)
- Draught: 5 m (16.4 ft)
- Ice class: Ice2
- Installed power: AC 380/220 V, 50 Hz, 4 × 630 kW ADG-630K Diesel Generators
- Propulsion: 2 shaft CODAD, 4 Kolomna 16D49 diesels 23,664 hp (17.6 MW)
- Speed: 27 knots (50 km/h; 31 mph)
- Range: 4,000 nmi (7,400 km; 4,600 mi) at 14 knots (26 km/h; 16 mph)
- Endurance: 15 Days
- Complement: 100
- Sensors & processing systems: Air search radar: Multi-purpose AESA naval radar mast/system "Zaslon"; Sonar: Zarya-M bow mounted. Minatavr-ISPN-M towed array sonar
- Electronic warfare & decoys: EW Suite: TK-25-5; Countermeasures: 4 × PK-10
- Armament: 1 × 100 mm A-190 Arsenal naval gun; 1 × 8 cells 3S14 UKSK VLS for Kalibr, Oniks, Otvet/Answer or Zircon anti-ship/cruise missiles; 2 × 8 VLS cells Redut; 2 × AK-630M CIWS; 2 × Paket-NK 324 mm quad torpedo tubes for anti-torpedo/anti-submarine torpedoes; 2 × 14.5 mm MTPU pedestal machine guns
- Aviation facilities: Helipad and hangar for Kamov Ka-27 helicopter

Gremyashchiy is the lead ship of the Gremyashchiy-class corvettes of the Russian Navy.

== Development and design ==
Gremyashchiy-class corvettes are very large multipurpose vessels, designed to complement the Steregushchiy class already being commissioned with the Russian Navy. They have been designed to have an improved habitability for higher endurance missions, and are able to launch cruise missiles.

The class was designed with German MTU diesels for propulsion. However, because of sanctions arising from the Russo-Ukrainian war, deliveries of MTU diesels beyond the first two units were stopped, resulting in the cancellation of further units. Instead, new units of the preceding Steregushchiy class are being ordered. In May 2016, corvette Gremyashchiy got two Russian-made 16D49 diesel turbines 1DDA-12000 from Kolomna Plant in St Petersburg, replacing the previously required German MTU diesels.

Project 20385 differs from its predecessor by greater dimensions and displacement. They have a steel hull and composite superstructure, with a bulbous bow and nine watertight subdivisions. Compared with the Soobrazitelny, Boikiy, Sovershennyy and Stoikiy ships, which are fitted with Redut air defense VLS system of 12 launchers on the bow, these new ships are equipped with a UKSK VLS system comprising eight launchers for either Kalibr, Oniks or Zircon anti-ship/cruise missiles. The Redut VLS system with 16 launchers has been placed on the stern. Another difference is the lack of the aft mast above the helicopter hangar, and single integrated mainmast that no longer includes separate open shelves for artillery and navigation radars.

== Construction and career ==
Gremyashchiy was laid down on 1 February 2012, and launched on 30 June 2017 by Severnaya Verf in Saint Petersburg. She was commissioned on 29 December 2020. In August 2021, the ship began her transit from the Baltic to the Pacific Fleet. She arrived at her home port of Vladivostok in November 2021.

On the 21 to 23 June 2022, Gremyashchiy and the frigate Marshal Shaposhnikov visited the port of Manila in the Philippines.

On 25 July 2022, she arrived at the point of her permanent basing Petropavlovsk-Kamchatsky. On 20 September 2023, she launched a cruise missile during exercises. She repeated a similar launch during an exercise in 2024. The corvette was reported active as of 2026.

== Gallery ==
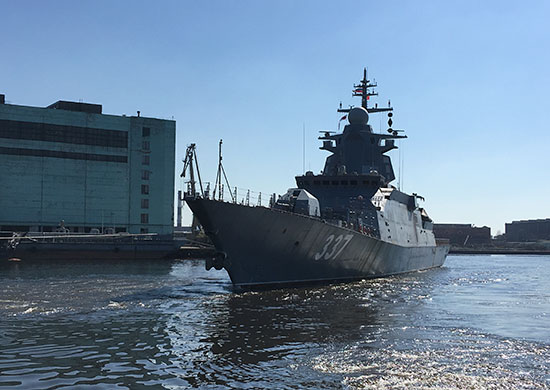
Gremyashchiy on 21 April 2019.
