= OOCL G-class container ship =

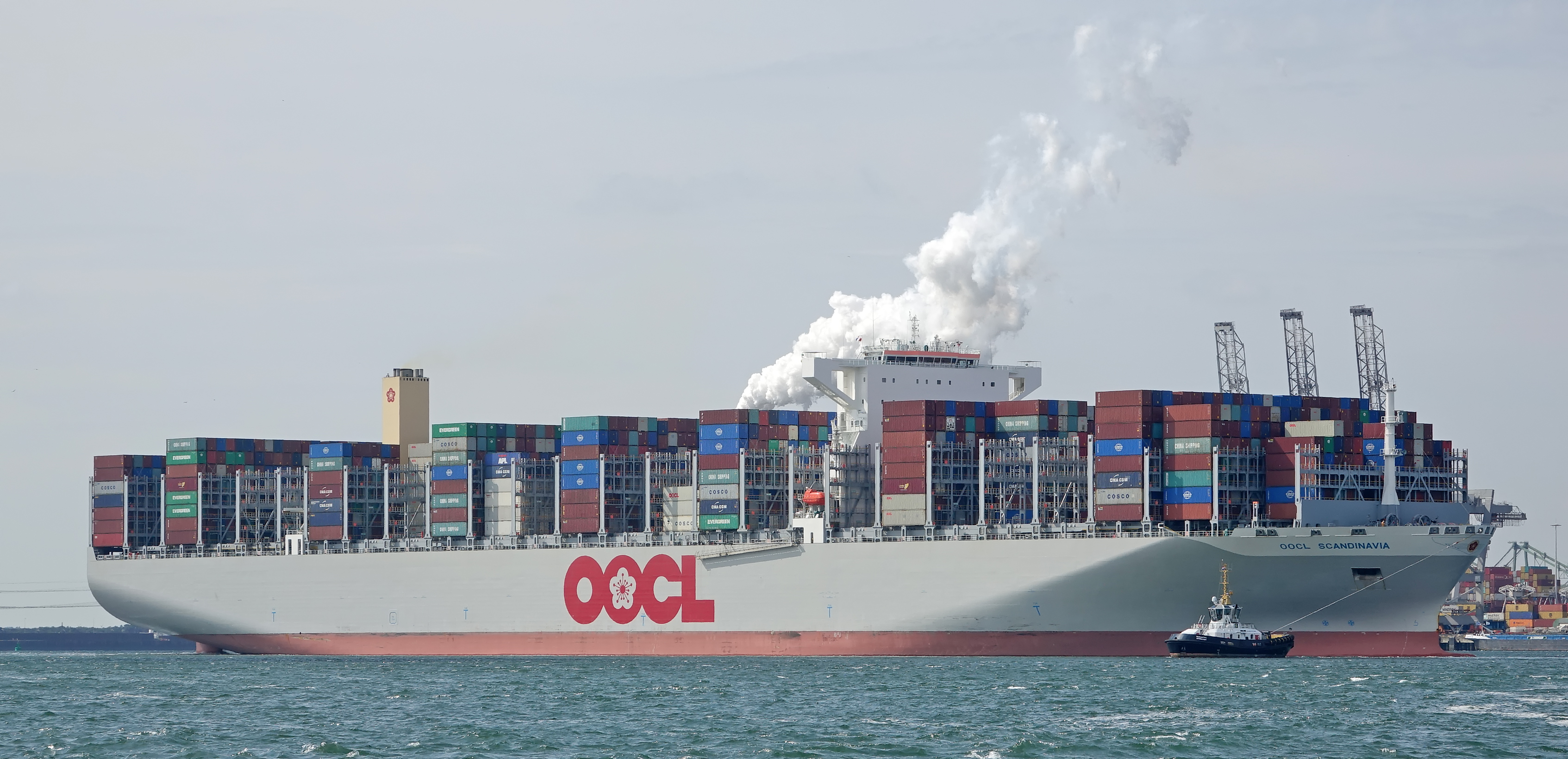
- OOCL Scandinavia in the port of Rotterdam

Class overview
- Builders: Samsung Heavy Industries
- Operators: OOCL
- In service: 2017-present
- Completed: 6
- Active: 6

General characteristics
- Type: Container ship
- Tonnage: 210,890 GT
- Length: 399.87 m (1,312 ft)
- Beam: 58.8 m (193 ft)
- Draught: 16 m (52 ft)
- Capacity: 21,413 TEU

The G class is a series of container ships built for OOCL. With a maximum theoretical capacity of 21,413 TEU they were the largest container ships in the world when they were built and the first ships with a capacity larger than 21,000 TEU. They took the title of largest container ships from Madrid Maersk (20,568 TEU). They have since been surpassed by other ships like the Gülsün class (23,756 TEU) and the Algeciras class (23,964 TEU).

The ships have 24 container bays. Containers can be placed 23 wide on deck and 21 wide below deck.

== History ==
In April 2015 Samsung Heavy Industries announced it had received an order from OOCL to build six container ships of 21,100 TEU for a total cost of 950 million USD. The first ship, the OOCL Hong Kong, was christened on 12 May 2017.

On 18 October 2017 the OOCL Japan suffered a mechanical failure while traversing the Suez Canal, causing the ship to run aground. She was quickly pulled free by tugs and was able to continue her maiden voyage to Europe.

The same thing happened again less than a year later. On 6 June 2018 the OOCL Japan again suffered a steering failure while in the Suez Canal. This time she struck the embankment causing damage to a road.

== List of ships ==
Ship	Yard number	IMO number	Delivery	Status	ref
OOCL Hong Kong	2172	9776171	18 May 2017	In service	
OOCL Germany	2173	9776183	24 Aug 2017	In service	
OOCL Japan	2174	9776195	11 Sep 2017	In service	
OOCL United Kingdom	2175	9776200	29 Sep 2017	In service	
OOCL Scandinavia	2176	9776212	28 Nov 2017	In service	
OOCL Indonesia	2177	9776224	18 Jan 2018	In service	

== See also ==
- OOCL M-class container ship
