= Himalayas-class container ship =

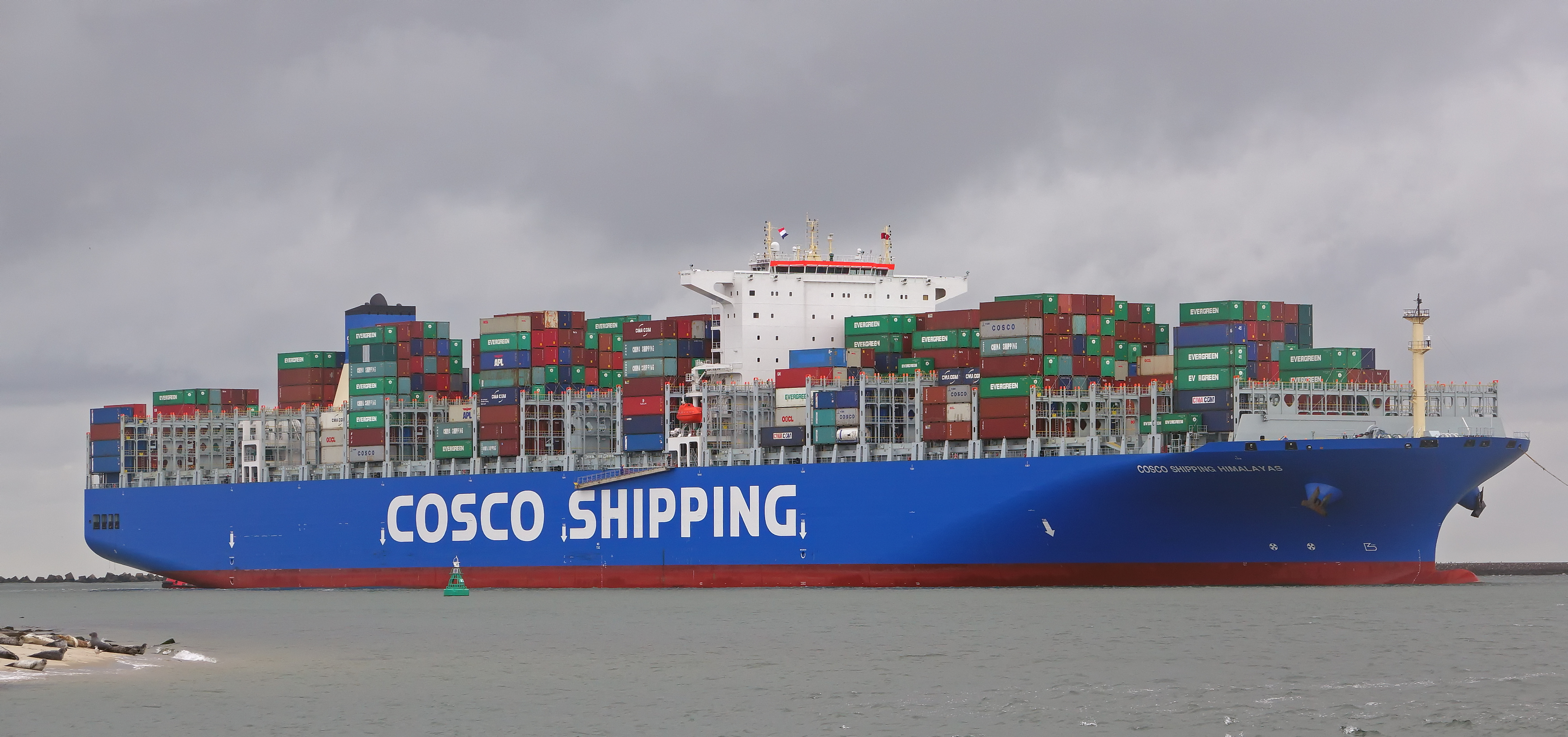
- COSCO Shipping Himalayas in the port of Rotterdam

Class overview
- Builders: Shanghai Jiangnan Changxing Shipbuilding
- Operators: COSCO SHIPPING Lines
- In service: 2017-present
- Planned: 5
- Building: 0
- Completed: 5
- Active: 5

General characteristics
- Type: Container ship
- Tonnage: 154,300 GT
- Length: 366 m (1,201 ft)
- Beam: 51.2 m (168 ft)
- Draft: 15.5 m (51 ft)
- Capacity: 14,566 TEU

The Himalayas class is a series of 5 container ships built for COSCO SHIPPING Lines. The ships have a maximum theoretical capacity of 14,566 TEU.

The ships were designed by Hudong Zhonghua and built by Shanghai Jiangnan Changxing Shipbuilding at their shipyard in Shanghai.

== List of ships ==
Ship	Yard number	IMO number	Delivery	Status	ref
COSCO Shipping Himalayas	3020	9757840	25 Jul 2017	In service	
COSCO Shipping Kilimanjaro	3021	9757852	22 Dec 2017	In service	
COSCO Shipping Alps	3022	9757864	3 Jan 2018	In service	
COSCO Shipping Denali	3023	9757876	13 Jun 2018	In service	
COSCO Shipping Andes	3024	9757888	12 Sep 2018	In service	
