= Gremyashchiy-class corvette =

Class of Russian warships

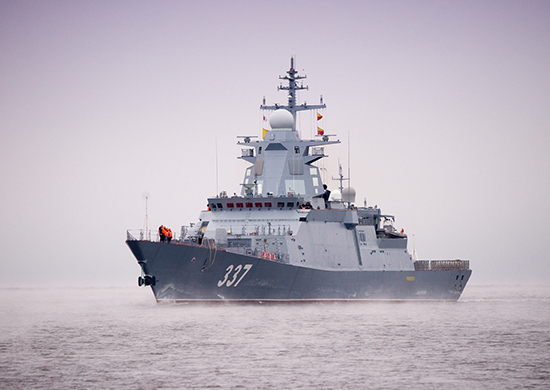
- Gremyashchiy on 13 November 2019

Class overview
- Name: Gremyashchiy class
- Builders: Severnaya Verf; Komsomolsk Shipyard
- Operators: Russian Navy
- Preceded by: Steregushchiy class
- Succeeded by: Project 20386
- Built: 2011–present
- In commission: 2020–
- Planned: 6
- Building: 4
- Completed: 2
- Active: 1

General characteristics
- Type: Guided missile corvette
- Displacement: 2,500 tons
- Length: 106.0 m (347.8 ft)
- Beam: 13 m (42.7 ft)
- Draught: 5 m (16.4 ft)
- Installed power: AC 380/220 V, 50 Hz, 4 × 630 kW diesel genset
- Propulsion: 2 shaft CODAD, 4 Kolomna 16D49 diesels 23,664 hp (17.6 MW)
- Speed: 27 knots (50 km/h; 31 mph)
- Range: 4,000 nmi (7,400 km; 4,600 mi) at 14 knots (26 km/h; 16 mph)
- Endurance: ?
- Complement: 100
- Sensors & processing systems: Air search radar: Multi-purpose AESA naval radar mast/system "Zaslon"; Fire control: MTK-201M3 electronic-optical television system for Gun system; Sonar: Zarya-M bow mounted. Vinyetka low frequency active/passive towed array; Navigation: PAL-N Navigation Radar
- Electronic warfare & decoys: EW Suite: TK-25-5; Countermeasures: 4 × PK-10
- Armament: 1 × 100 mm A-190 Arsenal naval gun; 8 (1 × 8) UKSK VLS cells for Kalibr, Oniks, Medvedka or Zircon anti-ship/cruise missiles; 16 (2 × 8) VLS cells Redut (can be quad-pack if use 9M100 variant); 2 × AK-630M CIWS; 2 × Paket-NK 324 mm quad torpedo tubes for anti-torpedo/anti-submarine torpedoes; 2 × 14.5 mm MTPU pedestal machine guns
- Aviation facilities: Helipad and hangar for Kamov Ka-27 helicopter

The Gremyashchiy class (Russian: Гремящий, lit. 'Thunderous'), Russian designation Project 20385, is an update of the Steregushchiy-class corvettes of the Russian Navy at a cost of $150 million. This follow-on project was designed by the Almaz Central Marine Design Bureau in Saint Petersburg. The first ship was laid down on 26 May 2011 and the official laying down ceremony took place on 1 February 2012. Although classified as corvettes by the Russian Navy, these ships carry sensors and weapon systems akin to frigates and, as a result, are so classified by NATO.

== History ==
Gremyashchiy-class corvettes are very large multipurpose vessels, designed to complement the Steregushchiy class already being commissioned with the Russian Navy. They have been designed to have an improved habitability for higher endurance missions, and are able to launch cruise missiles.

The class was designed with German MTU diesels for propulsion. However, because of sanctions arising from the Russo-Ukrainian war, deliveries of MTU diesels beyond the first two units were stopped, resulting in the cancellation of further units. Instead, new units of the preceding Steregushchiy class are being ordered. In May 2016, corvette Gremyashchiy received two Russian-made 1DDA-12000 diesel units from Kolomna Works, based on their 16D49 engines, replacing the previously required German MTU diesels.

The lead vessel of the class, Gremyashchiy, went on sea trials in late April 2019. On 31 October 2019, Russian President Vladimir Putin announced Gremyashchiy will be equipped with the hypersonic 3M22 Zircon anti-ship cruise missiles. In December 2019, as part of its state acceptance trials, the ship entered White Sea to test its main missile system against various types of targets.

An additional order of two corvettes was made in August 2020. Since the order for the Project 20385 vessels was made in conjunction with a larger order for additional Project 20380 ships, the new vessels could be built either at the Amur Shipyard, if destined for the Pacific Fleet, or alternatively at Severnaya Verf. As of November 2020, the allocation between shipyards had still to be decided. In December it was announced that four new corvettes of the class would be built at the Amur Shipyard for the Pacific Fleet with service entry envisaged between 2024 and 2028, though subsequently the initial dates for service entry slipped by several years.

In December 2021, Provorny suffered severe fire damage while under construction at the Severnaya Verf yard. A rebuild was reported as likely to take five years.

In June 2024, Provorny was relaunched at the Northern Shipyard in St. Petersburg.

== Design ==
Project 20385 differs from its predecessor by greater dimensions and displacement. They have a steel hull and composite superstructure, with a bulbous bow and nine watertight subdivisions. Compared with the Soobrazitelny, Boikiy, Sovershennyy and Stoikiy ships, which are fitted with Redut air defense VLS system of 12 launchers on the bow, these new ships are equipped with a UKSK VLS system comprising eight launchers for either Kalibr, Oniks or Zircon anti-ship/cruise missiles. The Redut VLS system with 16 launchers has been placed on the stern. Another difference is the lack of the aft mast above the helicopter hangar, and single integrated mainmast that no longer includes separate open shelves for artillery and navigation radars.

== Ships ==
All of the Gremyashchiy-class corvettes are destined to serve in the Pacific Fleet.

Name	Hull No.	Builders	Laid down	Launched	Commissioned	Fleet	Status
Gremyashchiy	337	Severnaya Verf, St. Petersburg	26 May 2011	30 June 2017	29 December 2020	Pacific	Active as of 2026
Provornyy		Severnaya Verf, St. Petersburg	25 July 2013	September 2019 (original launch date)	2026?	Pacific	Ftting out; severe fire damage December 2021; re-launched 18 June 2024
Buiniy		Amur Shipyard	23 August 2021		2027	Pacific	Under construction
Razumnyy		Amur Shipyard	12 June 2022		2027	Pacific	Under construction
Bystriy		Amur Shipyard	4 July 2022		2028	Pacific	Under construction
Retiviy		Amur Shipyard	9 June 2023			Pacific	Under construction

== Gallery ==
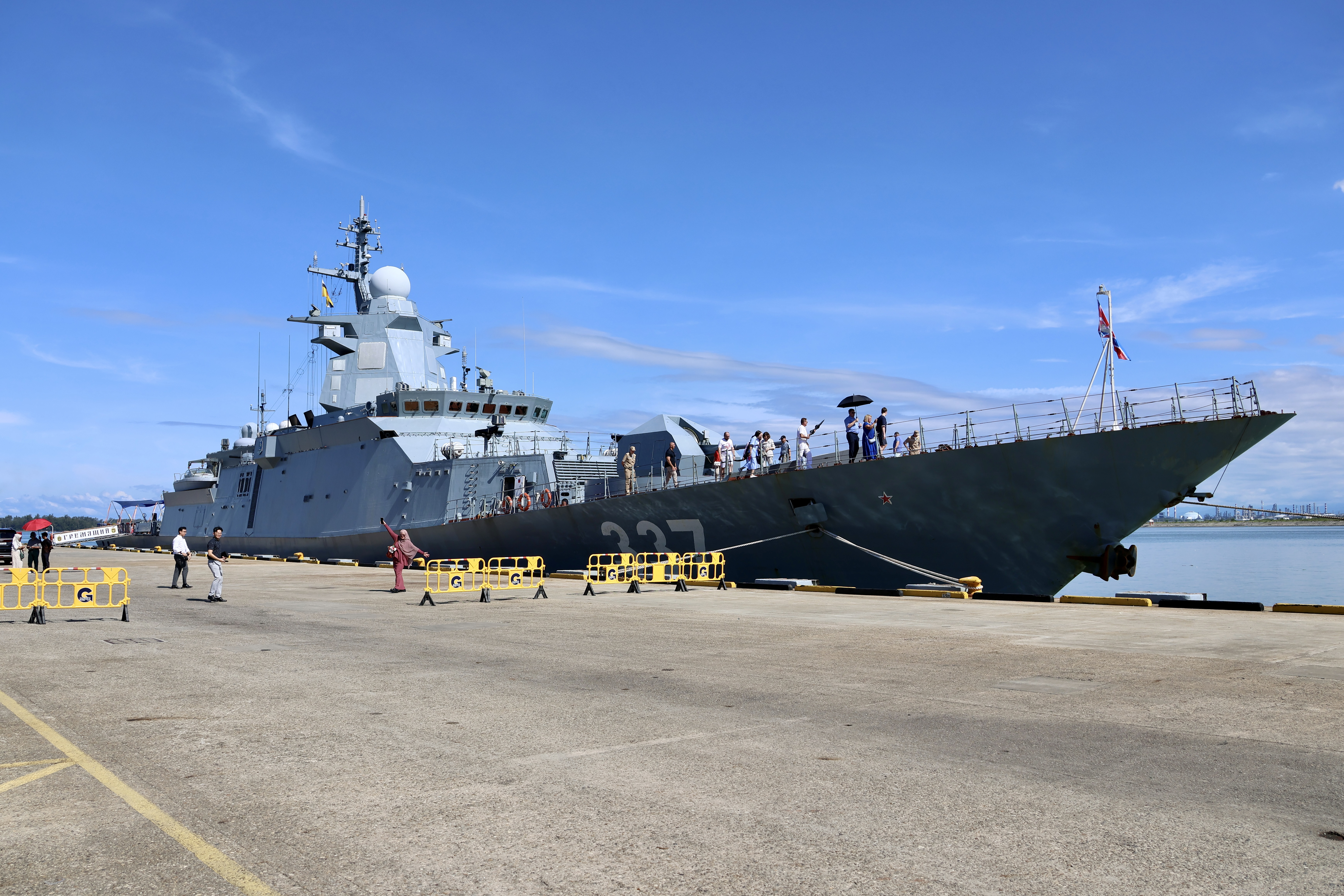
the Gremyaschiy in Muara Port in Brunei.

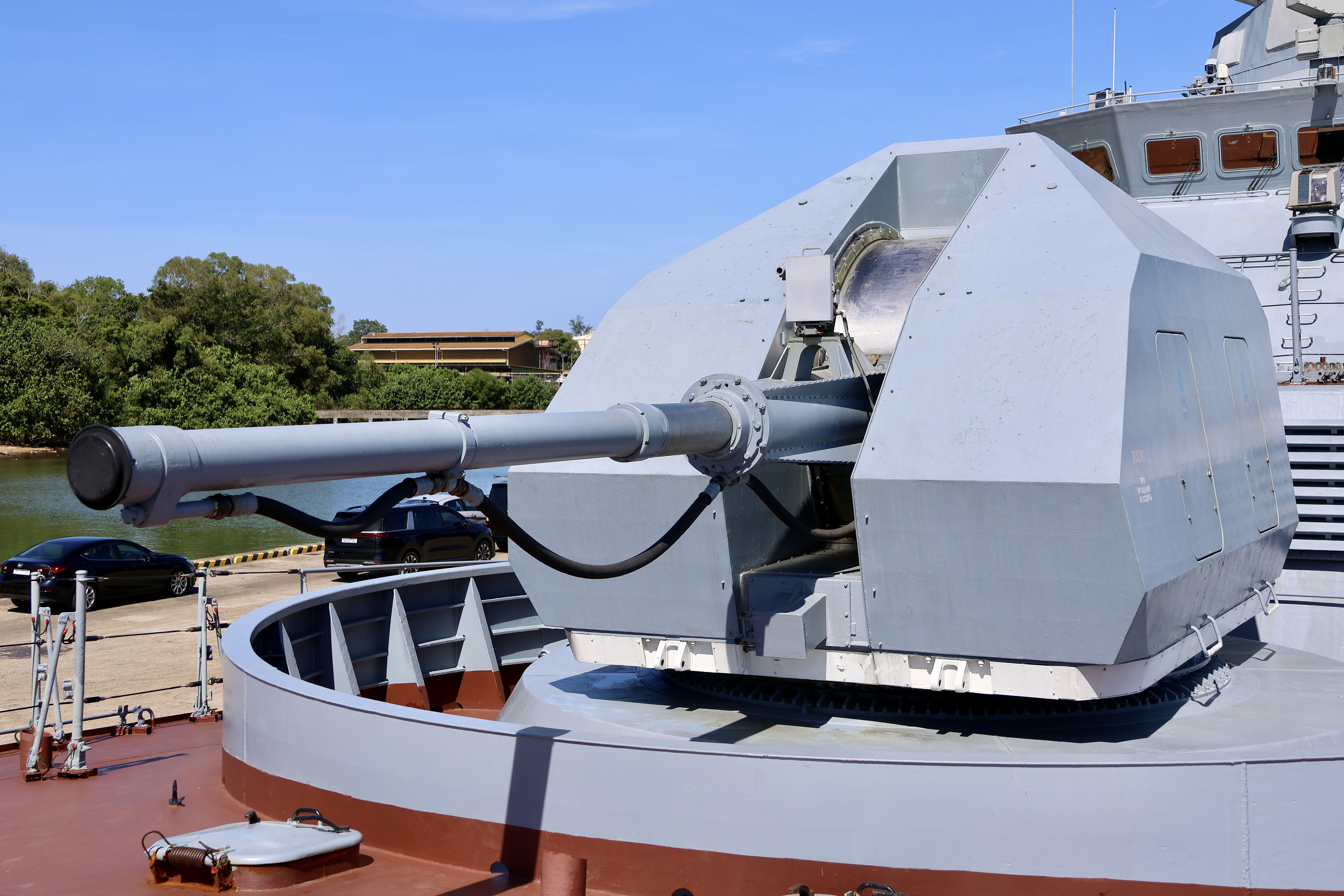
The A-190 Arsenal on the Gremyashchiy

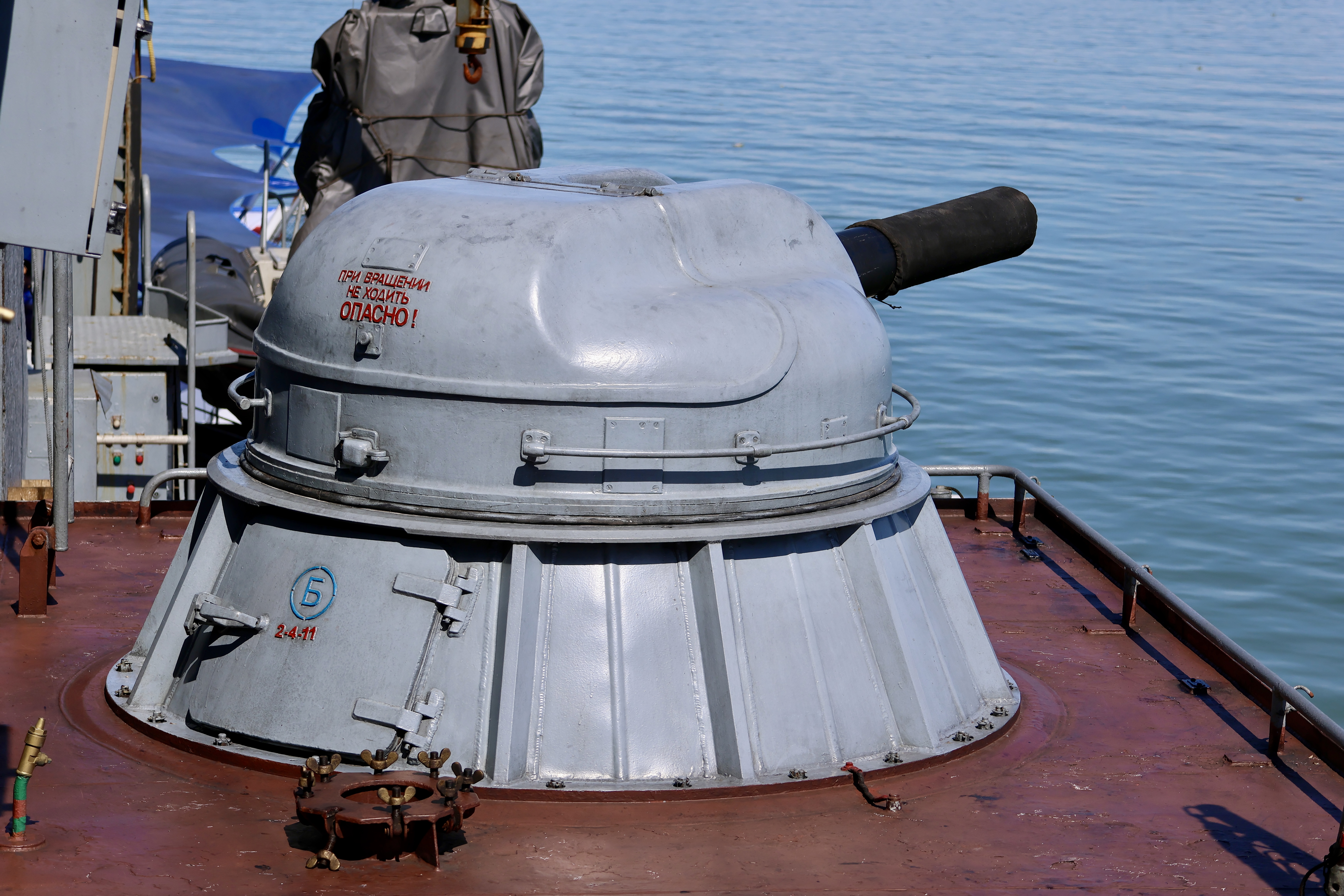
One of the AK-630s on the Gremyashchiy

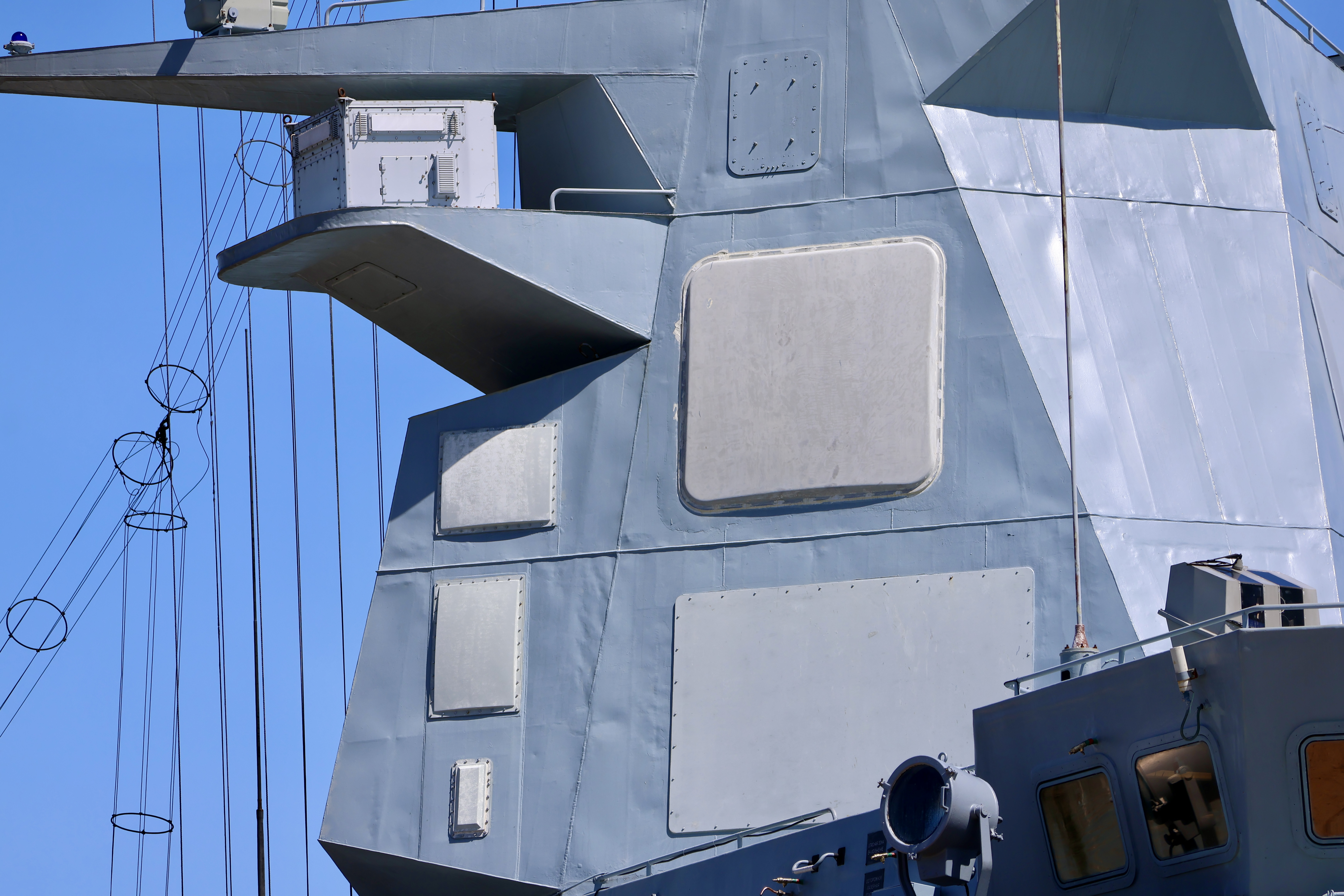
The various sensors and radars on the Gremyaschiy

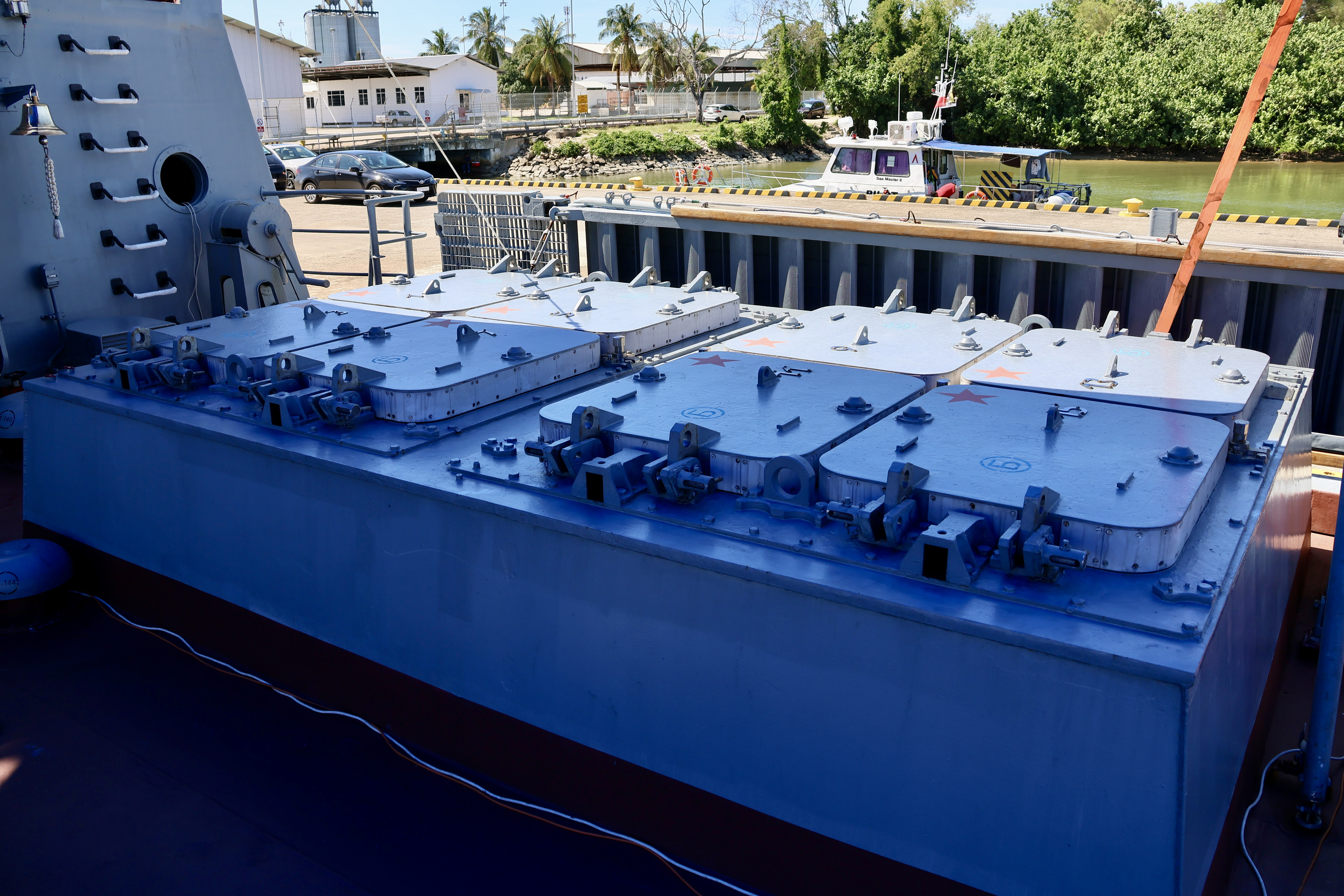
One of two Redut VLS systems on the aft of the Gremyashchiy.

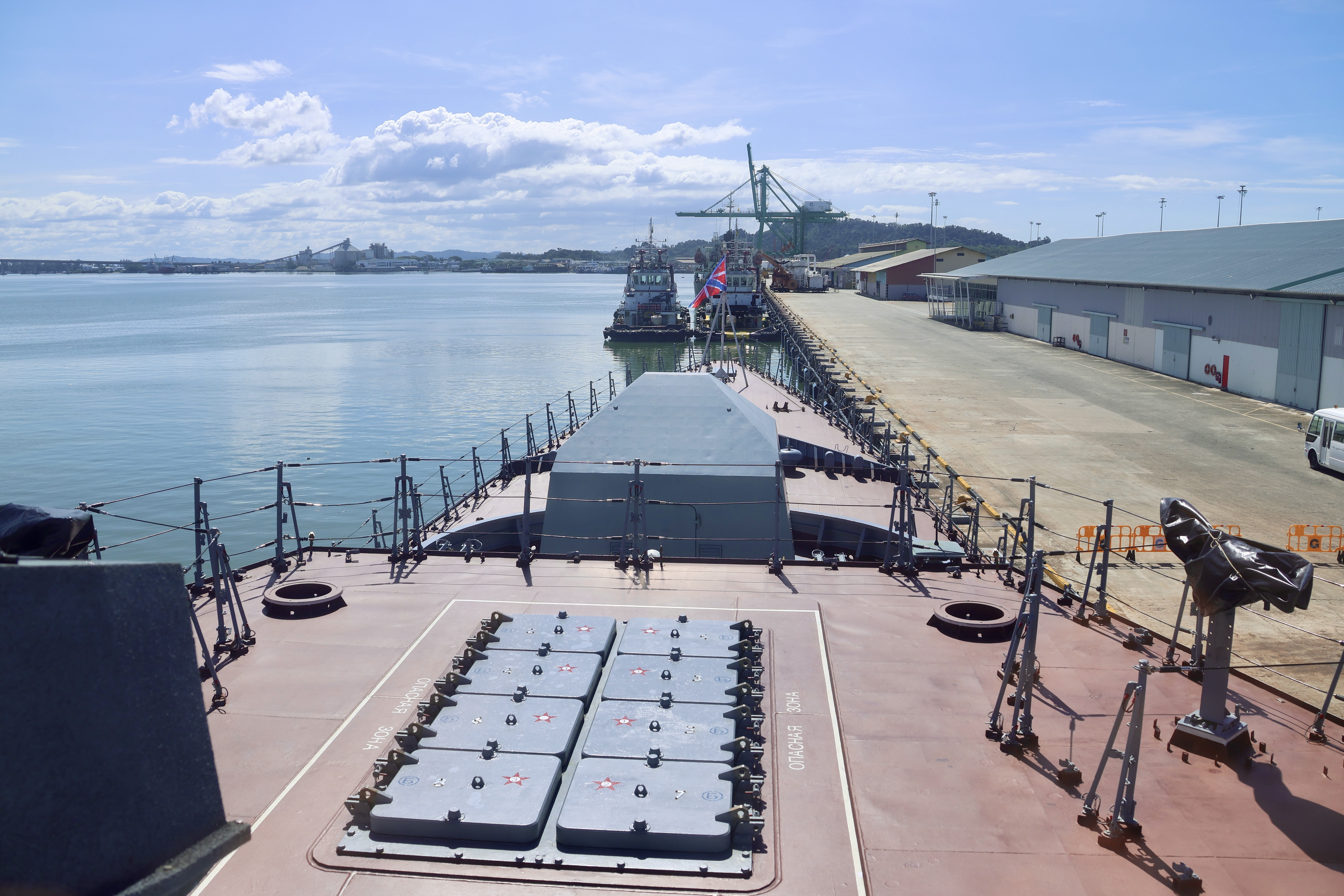
The 3S-14 (UKSK) on the Gremyashchiy.

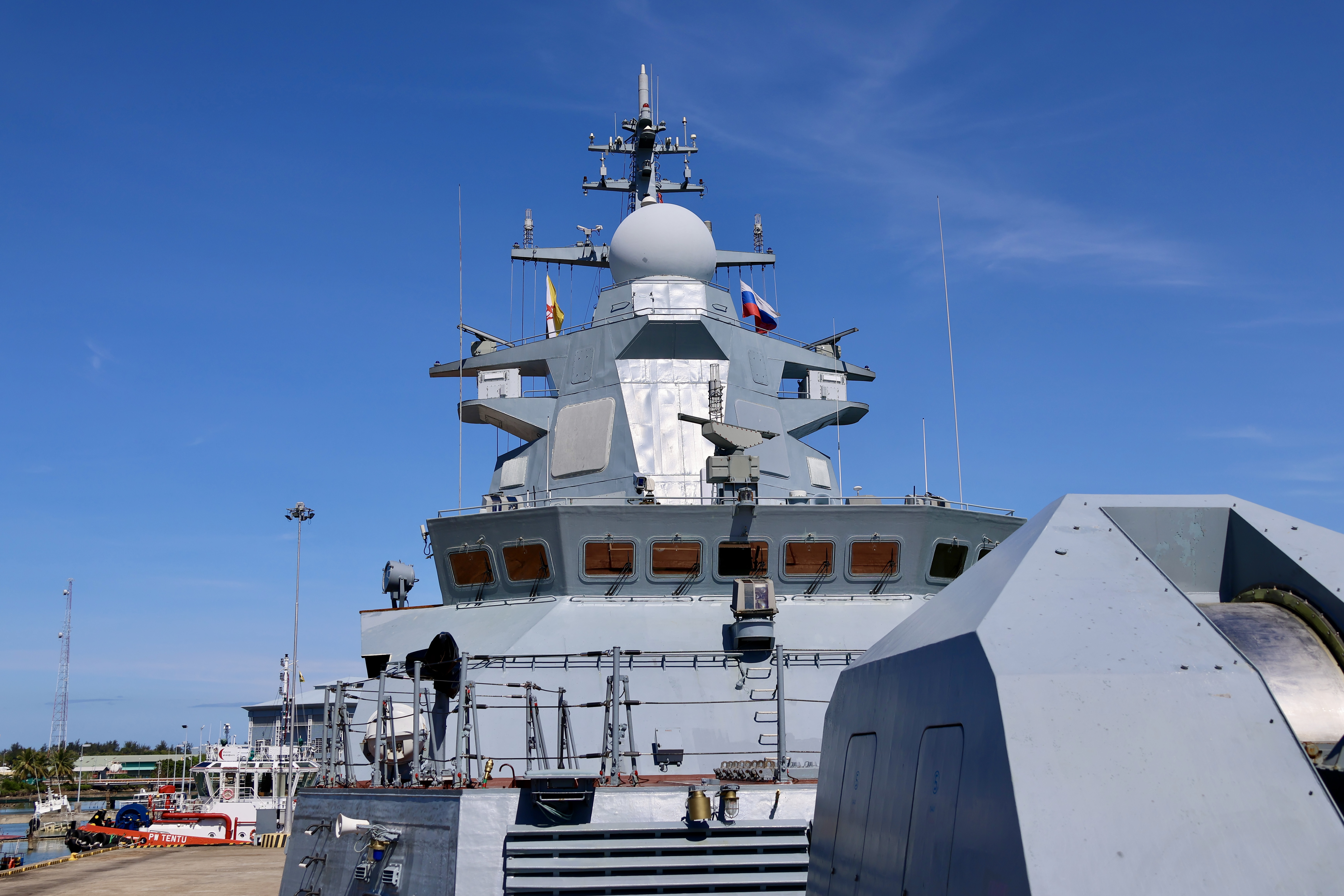
A view of the Gremyashchiy's superstructure

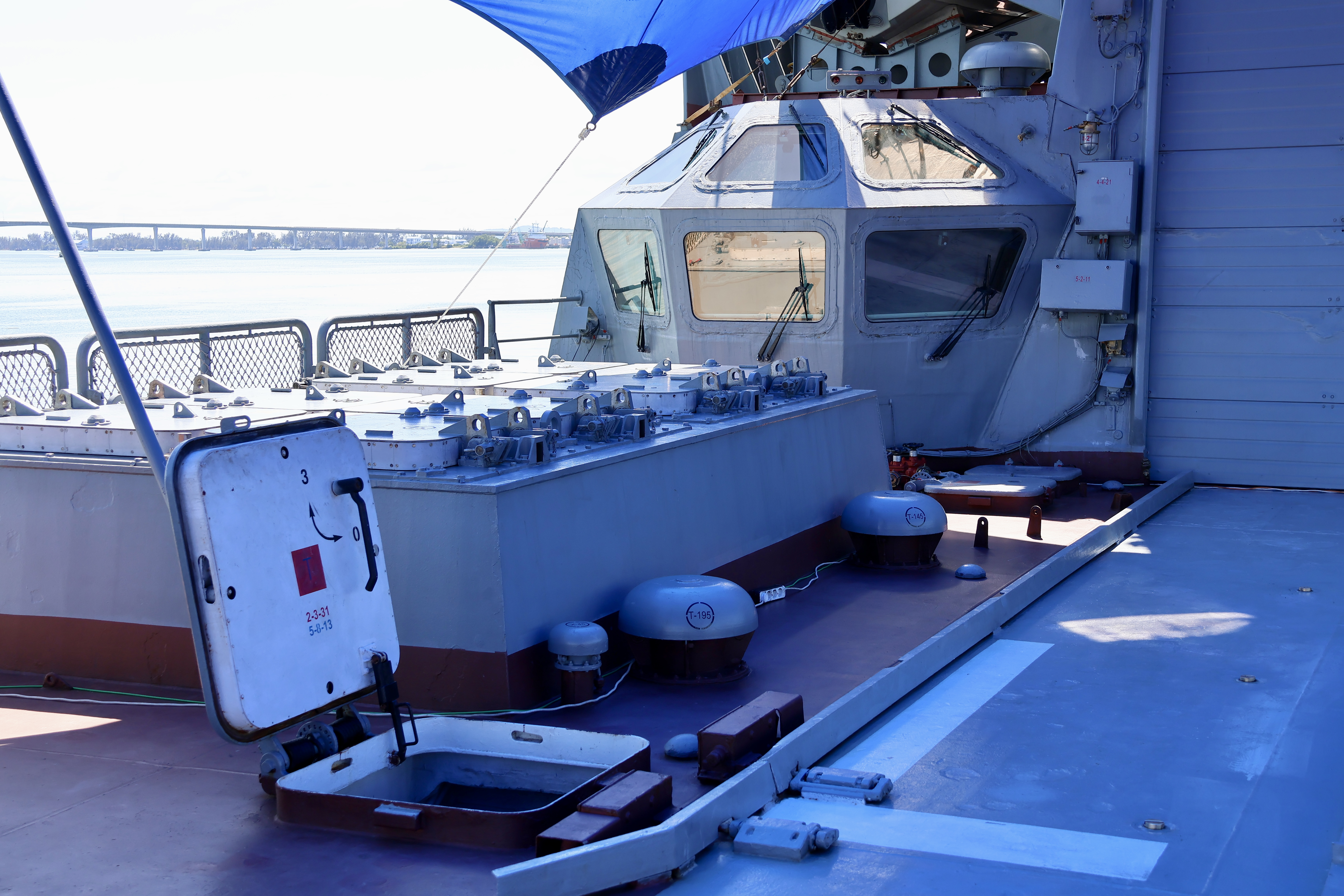
The helicopter launch/control center on the aft of the Gremyashchiy, next to the portside Redut system

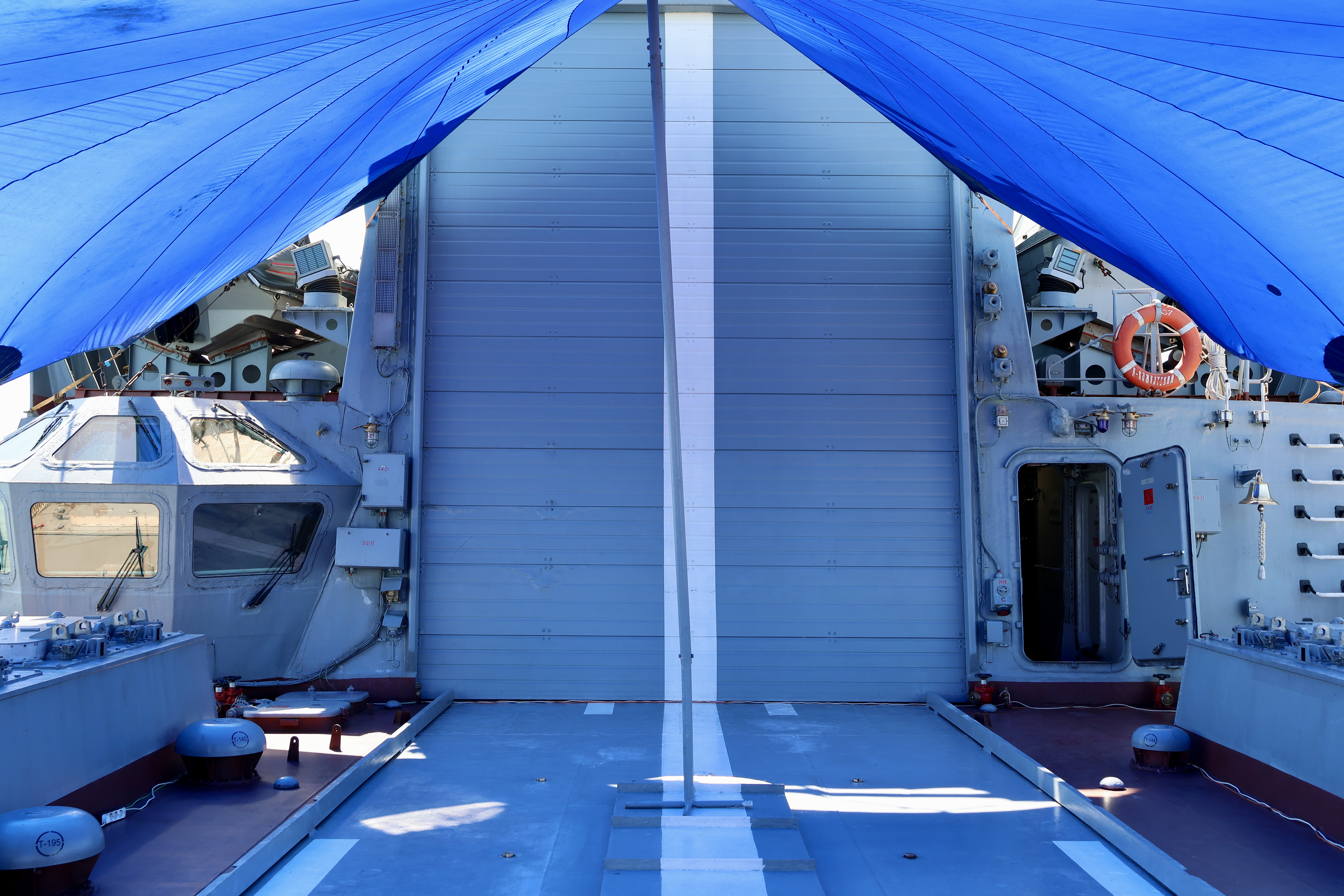
The single helicopter hangar on the Gremyashchiy's aft

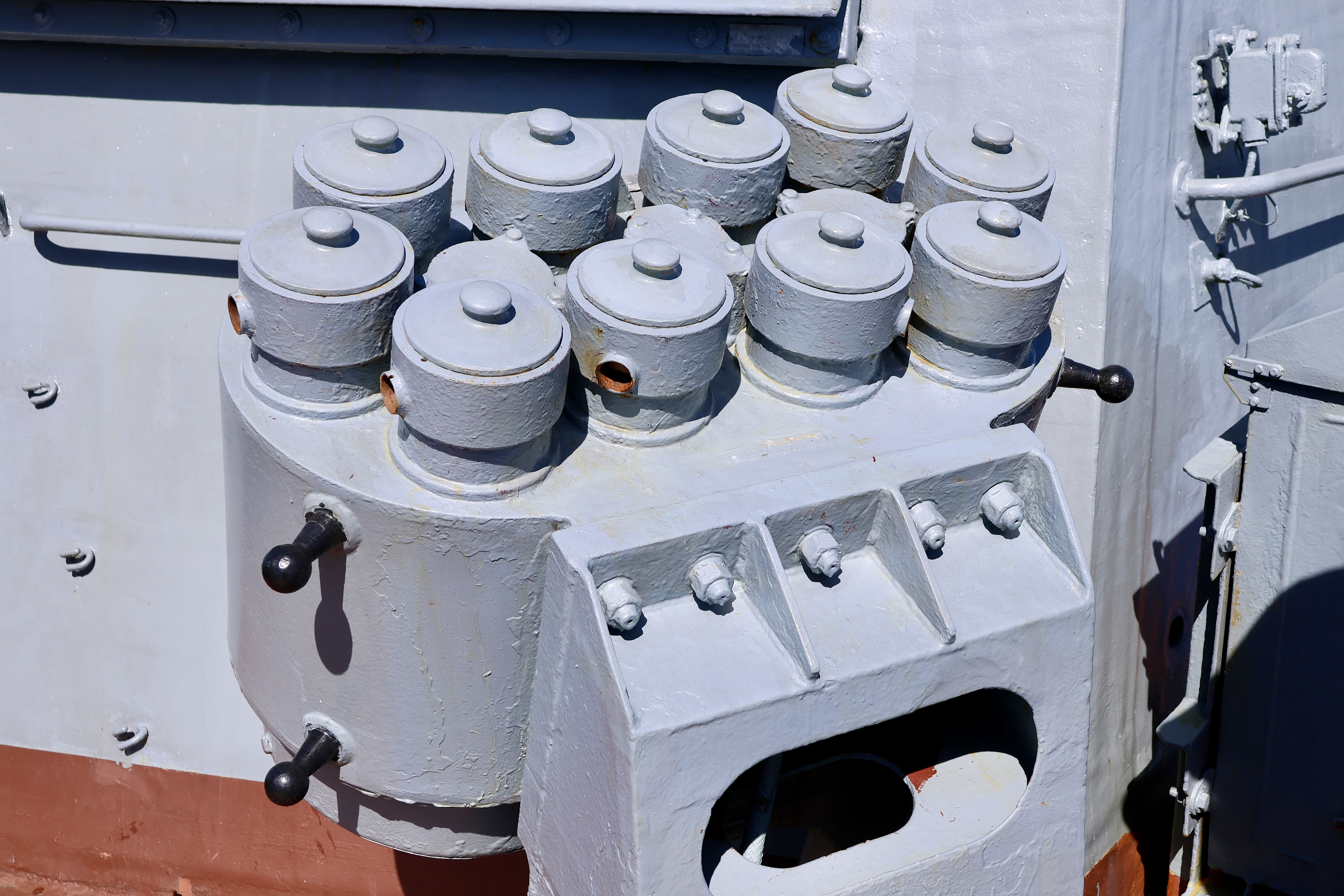
A decoy launcher on the Gremyashchiy

== See also ==
- List of ships of the Soviet Navy
- List of ships of Russia by project number
