= MV Kanuni D.S. =

Turkish cargo ship

History

Turkey
- Name: Kanuni D.S.
- Owner: Es Group Denizcilik Sanayi Ve Ticaret Anonim Şirketi
- Port of registry: Turkey
- Builder: Özata Shipyard, Yalova
- Laid down: 4 November 2016
- Launched: 9 February 2017
- Completed: 29 May 2017
- Identification: IMO number: 9819325; MMSI number: 271044666; Call sign: TCA4419

General characteristics
- Class & type: K20-class dredging ship
- Tonnage: 551 GT
- Length: 41 m (134 ft 6 in)
- Beam: 16 m (52 ft 6 in)
- Draft: 2 m (6 ft 7 in)
- Propulsion: Diesel
- Speed: 12 kn

MV Kanuni D.S. is a Turkish dredging ship that was grounded in the Dardanelles to avoid sinking in September 2019.

== Description ==
Kanuni D.S. is a K20-class dredger, used to remove sediment from the sea floor. It has a gross tonnage of 551 GT. Its length is 41 metres (135 ft), its beam is 16 metres (52 ft), and a draft of 2 metres (6 ft 7 in). Its diesel propulsion allows it a maximum speed of 12 knots.

== History ==
Kanuni D.S. was laid down on 4 November 2016 in Özata Shipyard, Yalova. It was launched on 9 February 2017 and completed for the company Es Group Denizcilik Sanayi Ve Ticaret Anonim Şirketi on 29 May 2017.

On 1 September 2019, Kanuni was anchored off the coast of Çanakkale, waiting to transit to Yalova. That evening, after the ship brought up anchor and was off the Marble Cape, it began to take on water in its front portion. Its captain called the local maritime authority, which sent the tugboat Rescue-6 to assist Kanuni. Before the tugboat arrived, the captain of Kanuni maneuvered the ship towards the shore, and managed to ground it in order to prevent its sinking. The crew spent the night on board despite the front section being completely submerged, and the ship was checked for safety by Coast Guard teams.
