= OOCL Germany =

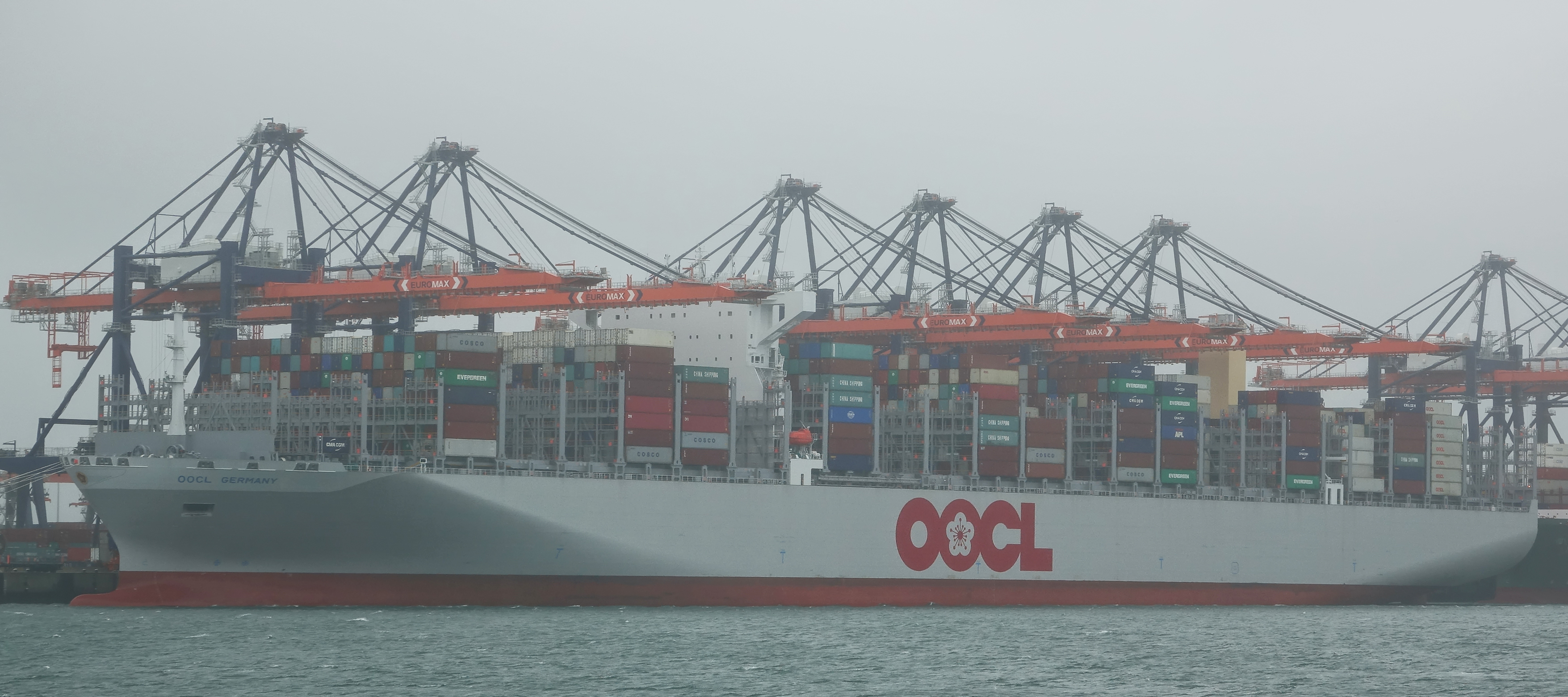
- OOCL Germany at Euromax terminals, Port of Rotterdam in 2017

History

Hong Kong
- Name: OOCL Germany
- Owner: OOCL
- Operator: OOCL
- Port of registry: Hong Kong
- Builder: Samsung Heavy Industries, Geoje
- Yard number: H2173
- Launched: 2017
- Identification: Call sign: VRQS3; IMO number: 9776183; MMSI number: 477035800
- Status: In service

General characteristics
- Class & type: G-class container ship
- Tonnage: 210,890 GT; 63,279 NT; 197,500 DWT
- Length: 400.00 m (1,312 ft 4 in)
- Beam: 59.00 m (193 ft 7 in)
- Draught: 15.00 m (49 ft 3 in)
- Depth: 32.50 m (106 ft 8 in)
- Installed power: 1 × Wärtsilä-Sulzer RTA96-C (1 × 80,080 kW)
- Propulsion: Diesel-electricTwo shafts, fixed pitch propellers
- Speed: 24 knots (44 km/h; 28 mph)
- Capacity: 21,413 TEU
- Crew: 20–30

OOCL Germany is the second G-class container ship built at the Samsung Heavy Industries shipyard in Geoje. She was completed and christened in August 2017 and entered service for OOCL's Asia-Europe trade lane.

== Construction ==
OOCL Germany has a length of 400.00 m (1,312 ft 4 in), beam of 59.00 m (193 ft 7 in), moulded depth of 32.50 m (106 ft 8 in) and draft of 15.00 m (49 ft 3 in). The ship is assessed at 197,500 tons deadweight (DWT), 210,890 gross tonnage (GT) and 63,279 net tonnage (NT). She has a capacity of 21,413 TEU.

== Engineering ==
The main engine of OOCL Germany is a Wärtsilä-Sulzer RTA96-C, which has an output power of 80,080 kW. The ship operates at a service speed of 22.5 knots (41.7 km/h; 25.9 mph), while the maximum speed exceeds 24.0 knots (44.4 km/h; 27.6 mph).
