= OOCL Hong Kong =

One of the largest container ship ever built

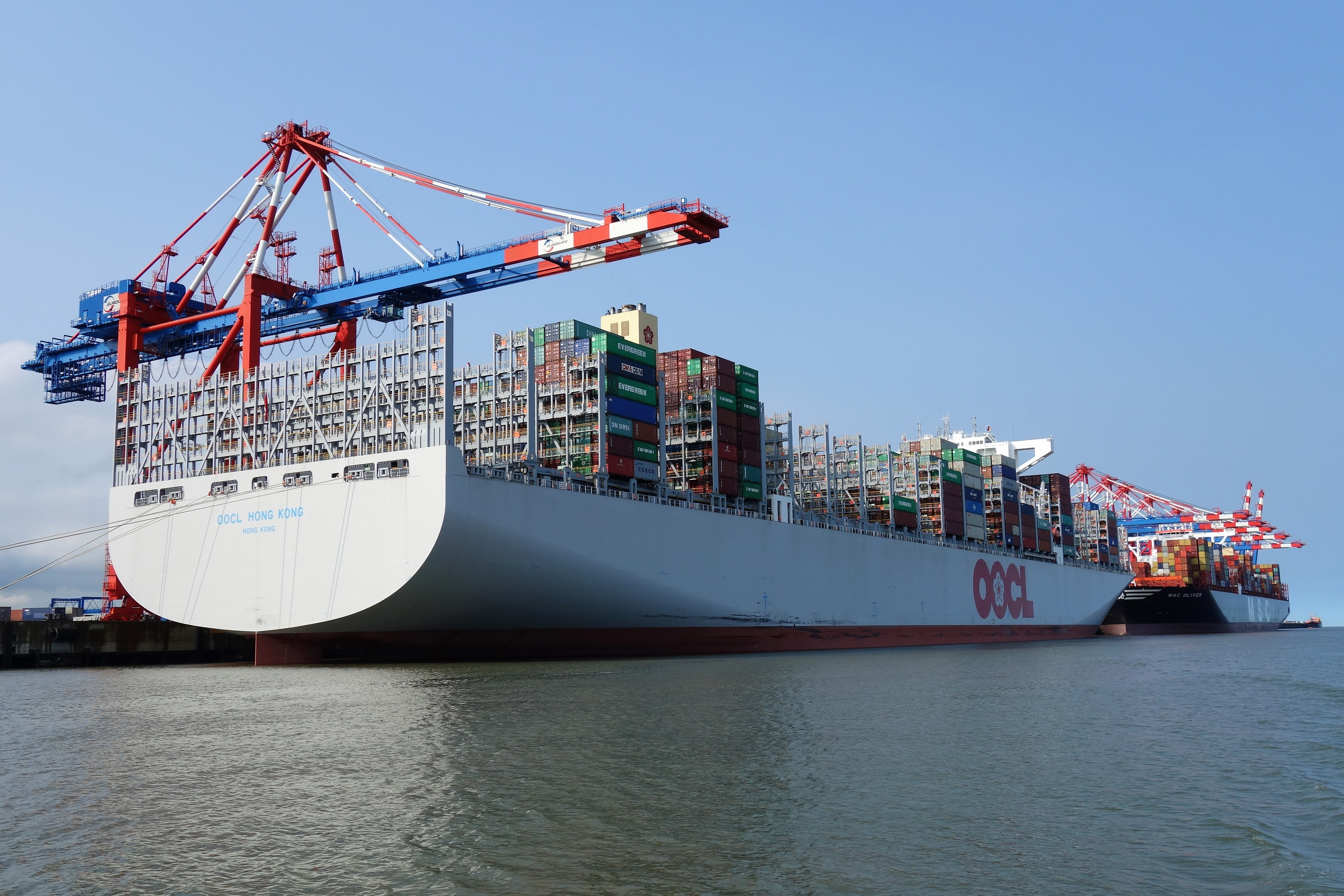
- OOCL Hong Kong at Container Terminal Wilhelmshaven (CTW) in September 2017

History

Hong Kong
- Name: OOCL Hong Kong
- Owner: OOCL
- Operator: OOCL
- Port of registry: Hong Kong
- Ordered: 31 March 2015
- Builder: Samsung Heavy Industries (Geoje, South Korea)
- Yard number: SN2172
- Laid down: 24 December 2015
- Launched: 31 December 2016
- Christened: 12 May 2017
- Acquired: May 2017
- Identification: Call sign: VRQL9; IMO number: 9776171; MMSI number: 477333500
- Status: In service
- Notes: In particulars, Draft refers to Air Draft.

General characteristics
- Class & type: G-class container ship
- Tonnage: 210,890 GT; 63,279 NT; 197,317 DWT
- Length: 399.87 m (1,311 ft 11 in)
- Beam: 58.80 m (192 ft 11 in)
- Draught: 16.00 m (52 ft 6 in)
- Depth: 32.50 m (106 ft 8 in) (deck edge to keel)
- Installed power: 1 × MAN B&W 11G95ME-C (1 × 75,570 kW)
- Propulsion: 11-cylinder 83,656 hp Diesel engine; Two shafts, fixed pitch propellers
- Speed: 22 knots (41 km/h; 25 mph)
- Capacity: 21,413 TEU

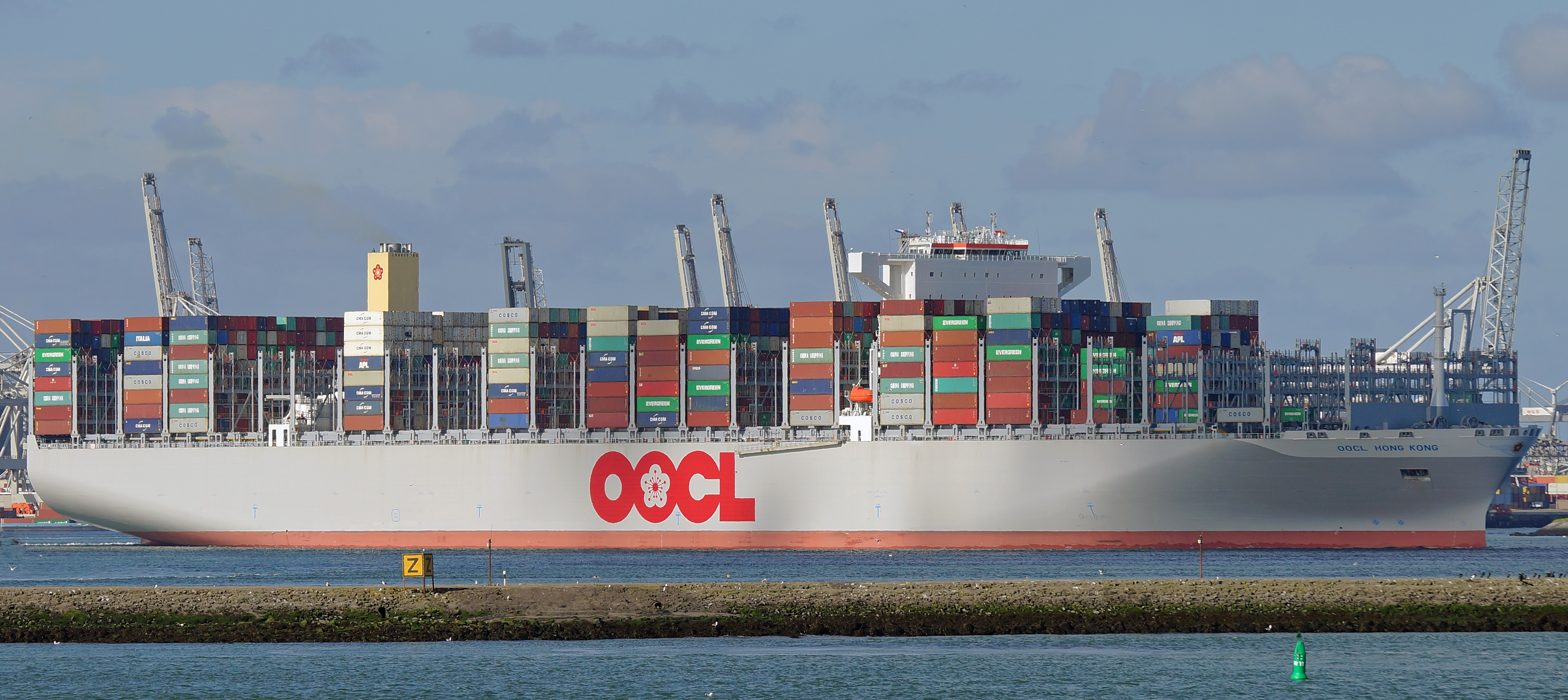
OOCL Hong Kong

OOCL Hong Kong was the largest container ship ever built at the time she (Note: Ships are often referred to as "she" due to maritime tradition and symbolism) was delivered in 2017, and the third container ship to surpass the 20,000 twenty-foot equivalent unit (TEU) threshold. She is also the first ship to surpass the 21,000 TEU mark. She is the lead ship of the G class, of which five other ships were built. She was built at the Samsung Heavy Industries, Geoje, shipyard with yard number 2172 and was christened and delivered in May 2017, only two months after the christening of the first ship to break the 20,000 TEU barrier, MOL Triumph. The six ships of the G-class were built within the same year at the same shipyard.

== Design ==
OOCL Hong Kong has a capacity of 21,413 TEUs, which are arranged in 23 rows. She also carries 14,904 cubic metres (14,904,000 L) of fuel. Machinery on deck includes ten 35-tonne tension force electrically driven, double-drum mooring winches and two combined electrically driven anchor windlasses for raising and lowering the anchor and its 142-millimetre (5.6 in) caliber chain. Power for onboard machinery is provided by four 4,300 kW generator sets and two bow thrusters.

OOCL Hong Kong is powered by an inline two-stroke, 11-cylinder MAN Diesel & Turbo (MDT) G-type 11G95ME-C9 engine, which generates 83,656 hp (62,382 kW) of power at 79 RPM. This engine allows for a top speed of 21 knots (39 km/h; 24 mph), although her cruising speed is only 14.6 knots (27.0 km/h; 16.8 mph).

== Service ==
OOCL Hong Kong and her sister ships—OOCL Japan, OOCL Germany, OOCL United Kingdom, OOCL Scandinavia, and OOCL Indonesia—serve the route from East Asia to Northern Europe calling at Shanghai, Ningbo, Xiamen, Yantian, Singapore, via Suez Canal, Felixstowe, Rotterdam and Gdańsk; returning via Wilhelmshaven, Felixstowe, via Suez Canal, Singapore, Yantian, and Shanghai in a 77-day round trip.

== See also ==
- Madrid Maersk
