= RPK-9 Medvedka =

Russian anti-submarine missile

SS-N-29
- Type: Anti-submarine missile

Service history
- Used by: Russia

Production history
- Designer: Moscow Institute of Thermal Technology

Specifications
- Mass: Whole system: 19.4 t Missile: 800 kg (1,800 lb)
- Length: 5.53 m (18.1 ft)
- Diameter: 400 mm (16 in)
- Warhead: MPT-1UE-Torpedo
- Operational range: 20 km (12 mi)

RPK-9 Medvedka ("Mole cricket", NATO Designation SS-N-29) is a Russian missile system used to engage submarines. The system consists of a launcher with eight missiles, each with the small torpedo as the warhead.

== Specifications ==
- Operational depth: 15–500 metres (49–1,640 ft)
- Total weight of system (with 8 missiles): 19.4 tonnes (19.1 long tons; 21.4 short tons)
- Total weight of system (with 4 missiles): 12 tonnes (12 long tons; 13 short tons)
- Missile weight: 800 kilograms (1,800 lb)
- Diameter: 400 millimetres (16 in)

== Operators ==
Russia

- Russian Navy
