= Soviet destroyer Gremyashchy (1959) =

Kanin-class destroyer

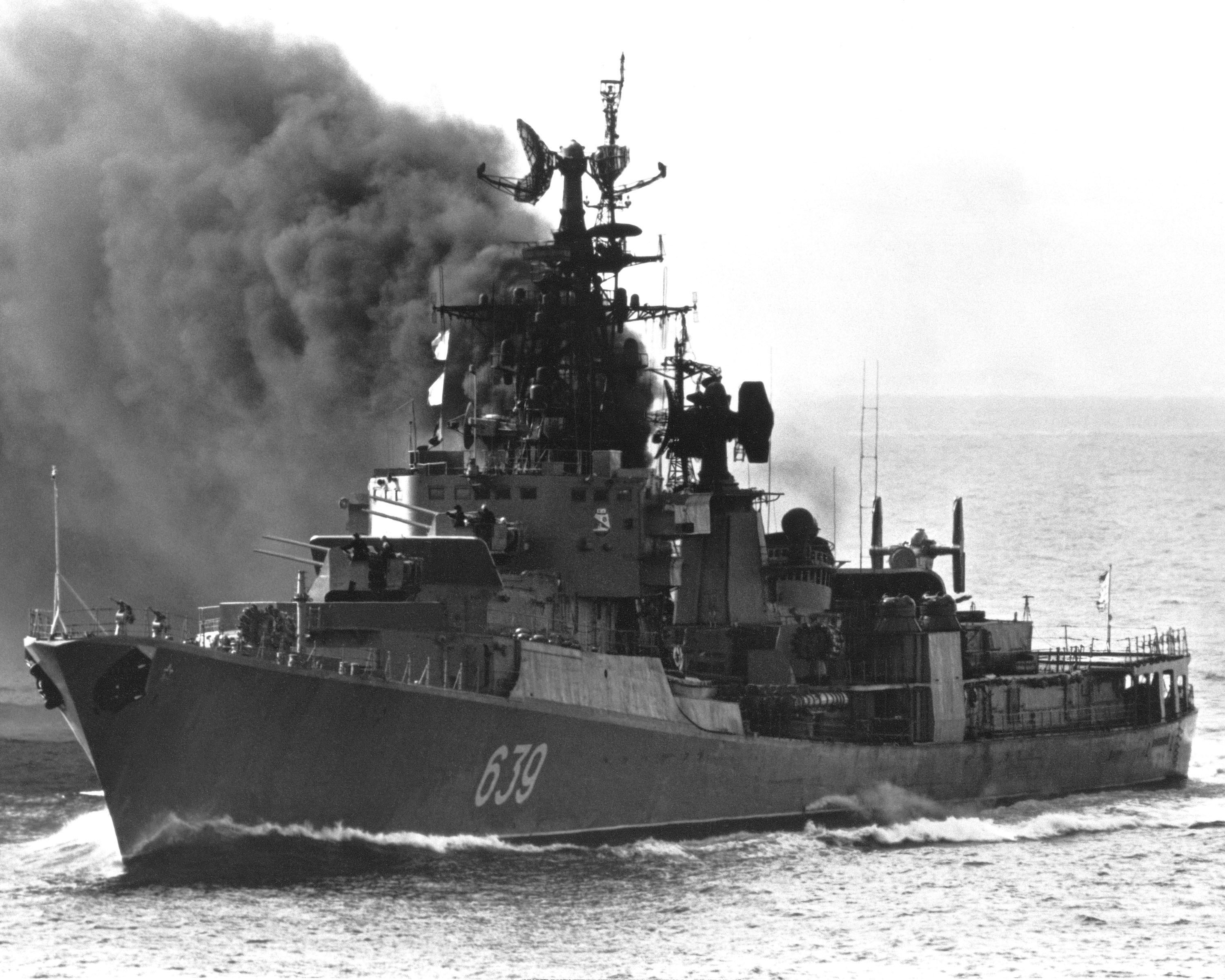
- Gremyashchy in 1983

History

Soviet Union
- Name: Gremyashchy; (Гремящий)
- Namesake: Thunderous in Russian
- Ordered: 17 December 1957
- Builder: Zhdanov Shipyard
- Laid down: 25 February 1958
- Launched: 30 April 1959
- Commissioned: 30 June 1960
- Decommissioned: 20 October 1991
- Renamed: OS-315
- Home port: Severomorsk
- Fate: Scrapped, 1994

General characteristics
- Class & type: Kanin-class destroyer
- Displacement: as built: 3,500 long tons (3,556 t) standard; 4,192 long tons (4,259 t) full load; as modernised: 3,700 long tons (3,759 t) standard; 4,500 long tons (4,572 t) full load
- Length: 126.1 m (414 ft)
- Beam: 12.7 m (42 ft)
- Draught: 4.2 m (14 ft)
- Installed power: 72,000 hp (54,000 kW)
- Propulsion: 2 × shaft geared steam turbines; 4 × boilers
- Speed: as built 34.5 knots (63.9 km/h; 39.7 mph)
- Complement: 320
- Sensors & processing systems: Radar: Angara/Head Net air-search radar; Zalp-Shch missile director; Neptun surface-search radar; Sonar: Pegas-2, replaced by Titan-2
- Armament: as built: 2 × SS-N-1 launchers (12 Missiles); 4 × quad 57 mm (2.2 in) guns; 2 × triple 533 mm (21 in) Torpedo tubes; 2 × RBU-2500 anti submarine rocket launchers; as modernised: 1 × twin SA-N-1 SAM launcher (32 Missiles); 2 × quad 57 mm (2.2 in) guns; 2 × twin 30 mm (1.2 in) AK-230 guns; 10 × 533 mm (21 in) torpedo tubes; 3 × RBU-6000 anti submarine rocket launchers
- Aviation facilities: Helipad

Gremyashchy was the lead ship of the Kanin-class destroyer of the Soviet Navy.

== Construction and career ==
The ship was built at Zhdanov Shipyard in Leningrad and was launched on 30 April 1959 and commissioned into the Northern Fleet on 30 June 1960.

In the period from 1966 to 29 January 1968 at the Zhdanov Shipyard, she was modernized according to the project 57-A, as a result of which, on 20 January 1969, she was reclassified into a large anti-submarine ship (BOD).

From 14 to 27 May 1970, she undergone a refit.

She made a visit to Cuba, in 1971 - visits to Norway and the Netherlands. In the same year, while in the war zone, she performed combat missions to provide assistance to the armed forces of Egypt.

On 7 July 1987, She was decommissioned, disarmed and reclassified into an experimental vessel (OS).

On 25 August 1988, she was renamed OS-315.

On 2 October 1991, the former Gremyashchy was excluded from the lists of the Navy ships in connection with the transfer to the OFI for dismantling and sale.

In 1994, she was sold to a private Indian firm in India.

== Gallery ==
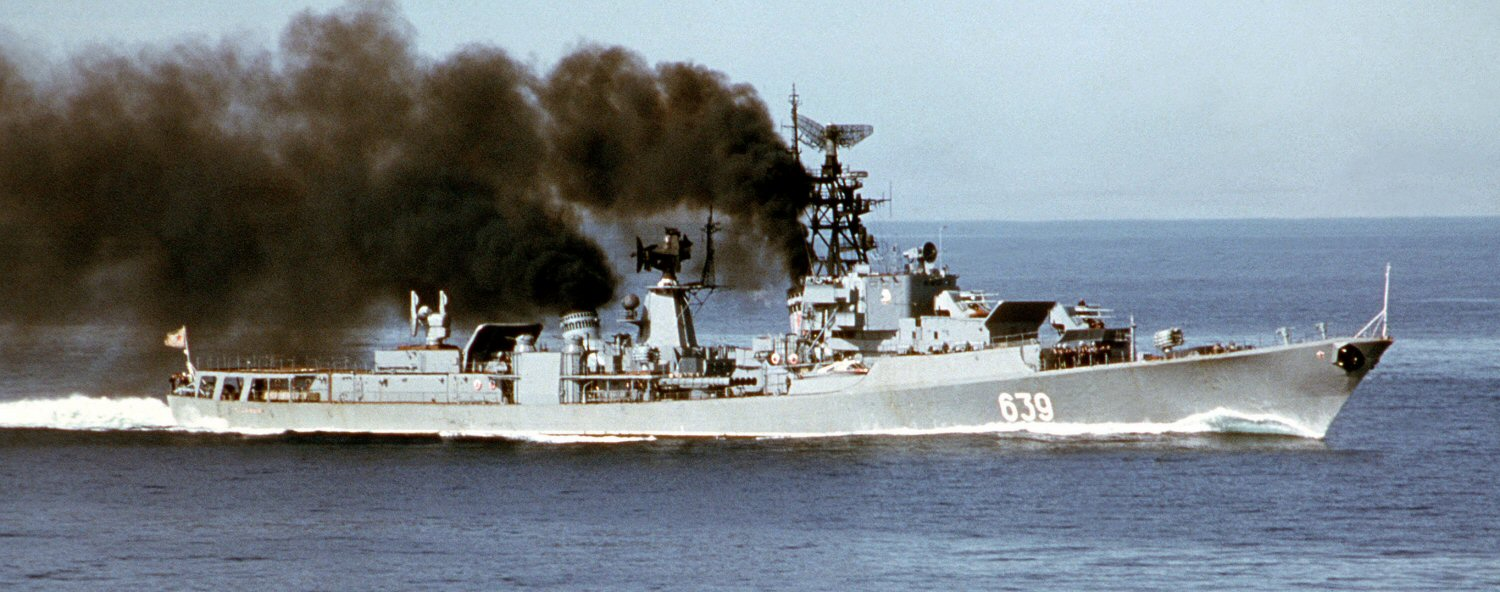
Gremyashchy on 26 October 1983

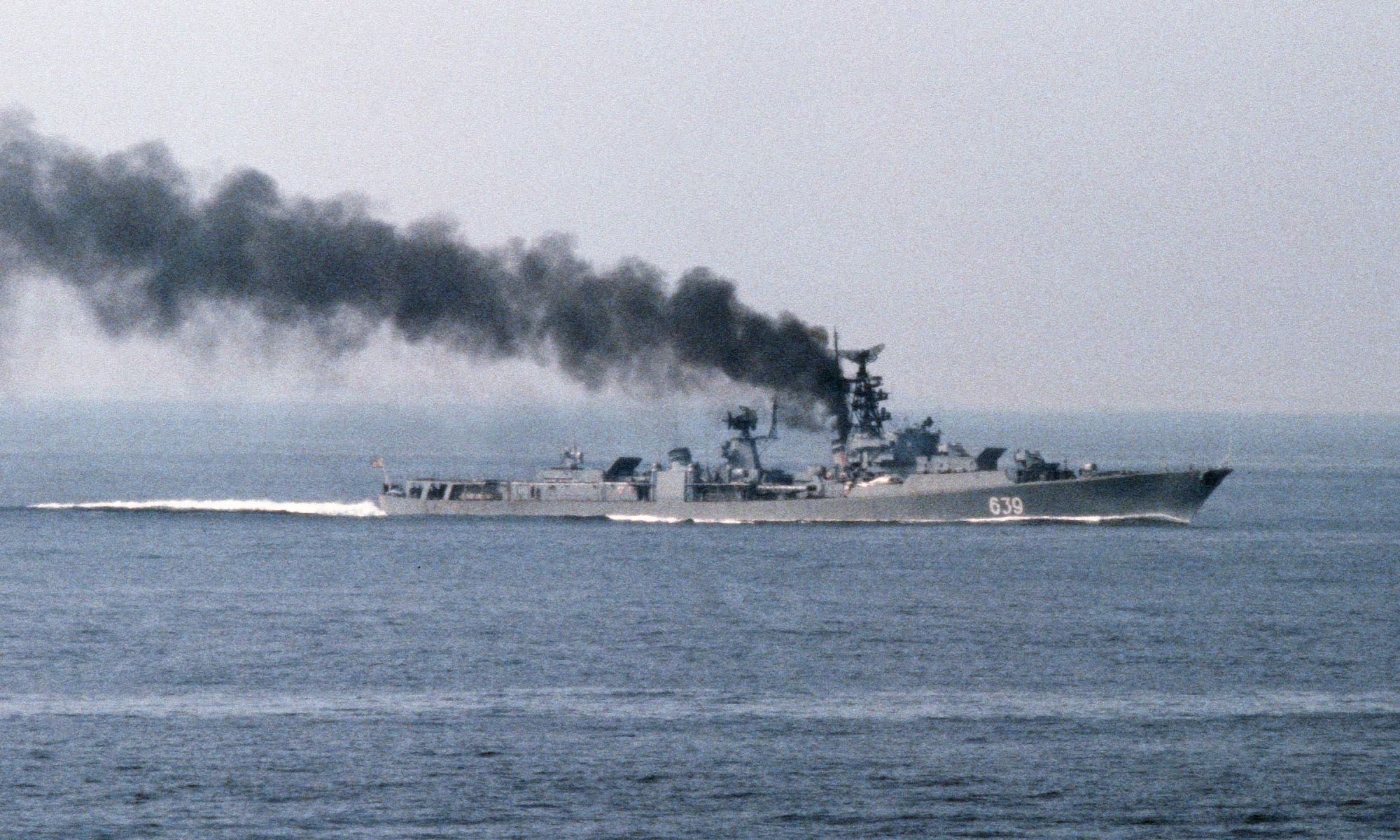

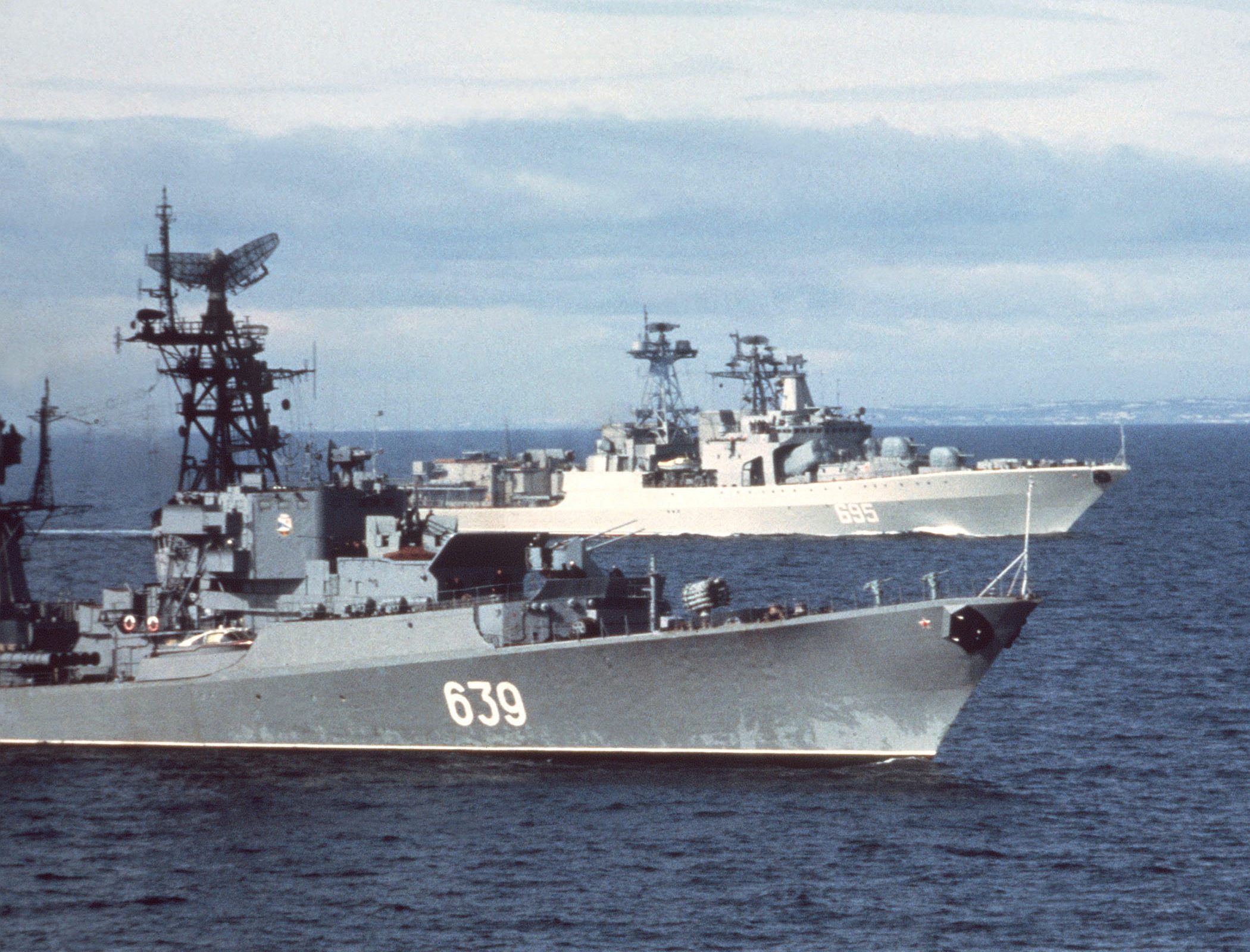

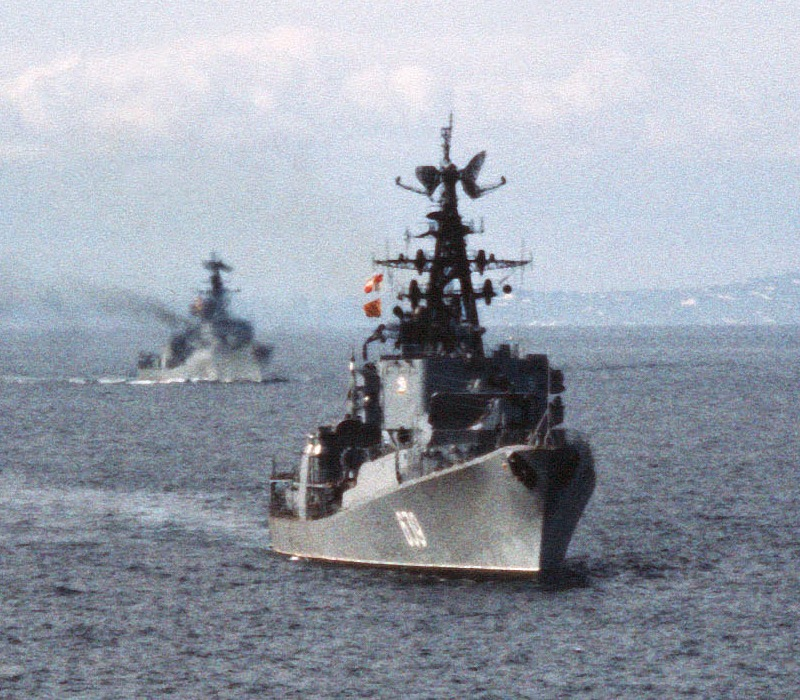
