= Wall Street Plaza =

Building in Manhattan, New York

88 Pine Street
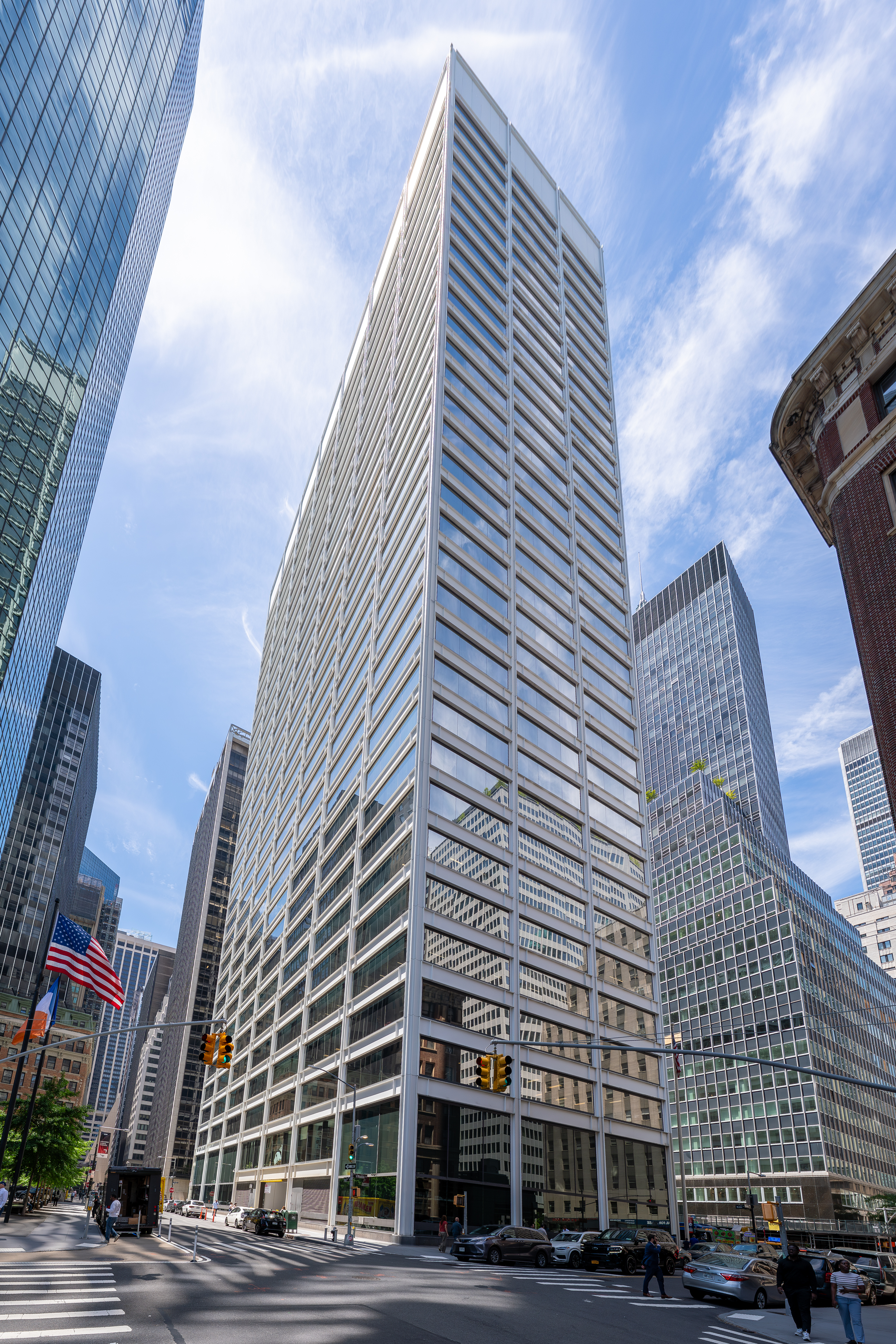
- Wall Street Plaza in 2026
- Interactive map of the 88 Pine Street area

General information
- Type: Office
- Location: New York City, New York, United States
- Coordinates: 40°42′20″N 74°00′22″W
- Construction started: 1973
- Completed: 1974
- Owner: Orient Overseas (International) Limited

Height
- Height: 417 feet

Technical details
- Floor count: 33
- Floor area: 624,000 square feet (as of 2016)

Design and construction
- Architects: James I. Freed; I. M. Pei and Partners

Wall Street Plaza, also known as 88 Pine Street, is an office building located between Pine Street, Water Street, Front Street, and Maiden Lane in the Financial District of Manhattan in New York City, New York, U.S. Despite its name, it does not adjoin Wall Street. A plaza owned by the building management but accessible to the public surrounds it and links the separated parts of Pine Street in a walkable fashion. Its lobby includes a plaque and memorabilia related to the RMS Queen Elizabeth, a former passenger liner that sank in 1972. During its early years, the building also hosted a variety of public art projects in otherwise unused space.

The building was built in 1973 for Orient Overseas (International) Limited, which has remained the owner since its construction.

== History ==
The building was designed by the firm I. M. Pei and Partners in 1973 for the Orient Overseas Association, a Hong Kong-based shipping line. The architect was James Ingo Freed. It was themed as a "light" tower, with glass and white-painted beams and columns, eschewing gray. Architecture critic Paul Goldberger remarked that for the era, the cost in building it was higher than more conventional office buildings, but it was not an extravagantly high budget either. Though the building is known as Wall Street Plaza, it does not adjoin Wall Street, instead being located at 88 Pine Street. David W. Dunlap wrote of the building's name that "Wall Street Plaza sounds more like a financial landmark than 88 Pine Street."

One early tenant of Wall Street Plaza was Banca Serfin. After I. M. Pei & Partners rebranded as Pei Cobb Freed & Partners, the firm moved into 88 Pine Street as tenants themselves in 2000. Another notable tenant – if for the wrong reasons – was telecommunications company Global Crossing, which was known to spend money rather loosely before their 2002 bankruptcy, and commissioned various changes to their rented floors at great expense.

In 2017, Orient Overseas was bought out by the conglomerate COSCO Shipping, a state-owned enterprise with its leaders hand-picked by the government of the People's Republic of China. This became relevant in a controversy two years later, in 2019. Amnesty International had been looking to lease office space at Wall Street Plaza, but the holding company pulled out of the deal at the last second, saying only that Amnesty was "not the best [potential] tenant". As owners are generally happy to lease space, this triggered speculation that pressure from the Chinese government was involved, as Amnesty has criticized human rights in China, in particular the actions of the government toward Western China's Uighur population.

== Exhibits ==
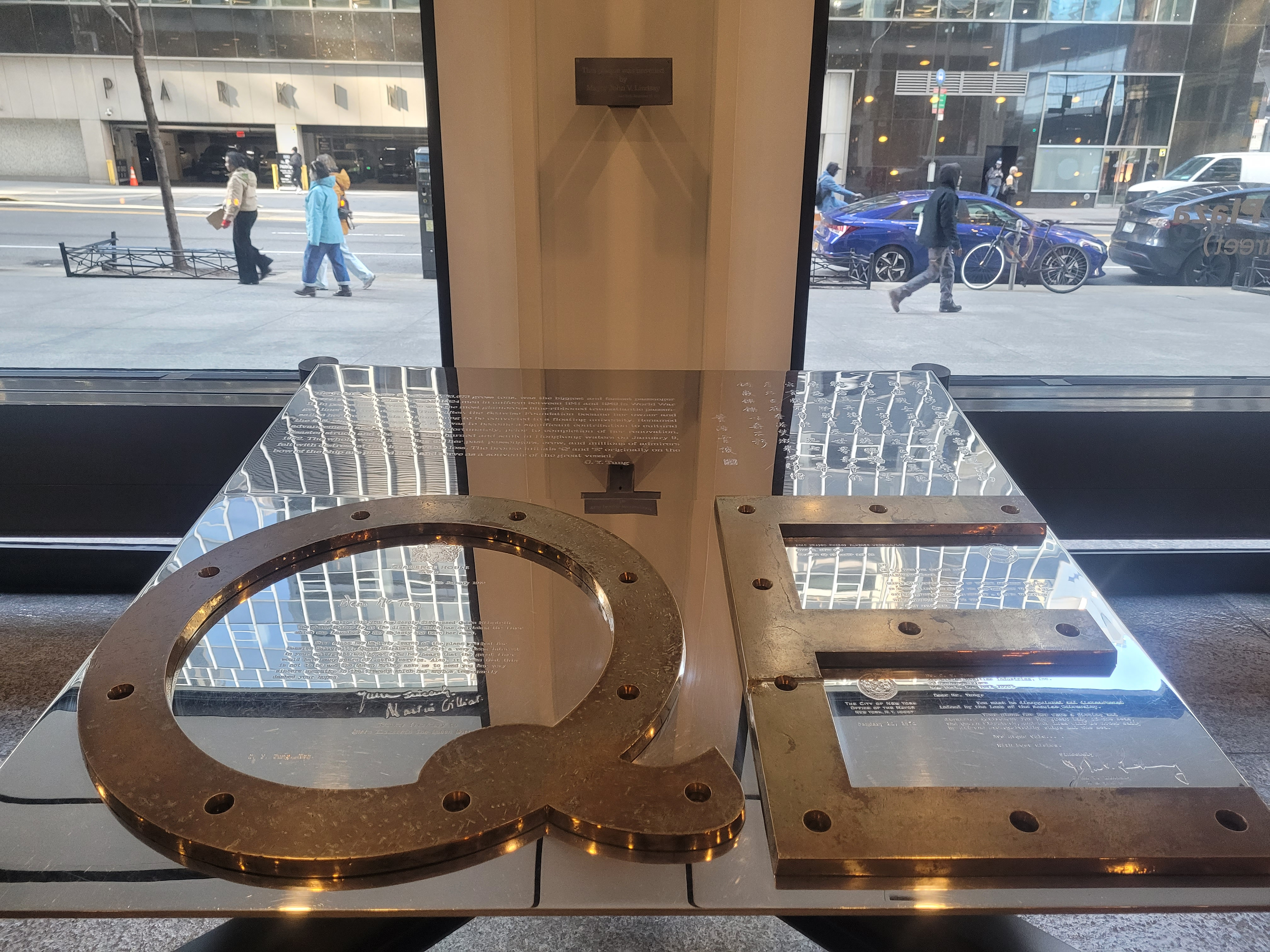
Bronze initials from the RMS Queen Elizabeth on display. The marker on the wall behind it says Mayor John Lindsay dedicated the building in December 1973.

The lobby features a plaque commemorating the ship RMS Queen Elizabeth, which sank in Hong Kong's Victoria Harbour in 1972. The bronze "Q" and "E" originally from the bow of the ship are displayed on it as a souvenir of the vessel.

Outside at the plaza is a shiny stainless steel disc and square by Taiwanese artist Yuyu Yang, maintained by the building. C. Y. Tung, the founder of Orient Overseas, personally commissioned the sculpture, which cost around $120,000 (in 1975; equivalent to $720,000 in 2025).

The nonprofit organization Creative Time ran four public art projects at 88 Pine Street during its early years, from 1974 to 1978. The exhibits used a street-level space intended to eventually be leased to a bank, while waiting for an interested party to move in. The most acclaimed and notable was the first, an exhibit created by the artist Red Grooms and his wife at the time Mimi Gross, "Ruckus Manhattan". It was a not-to-scale, participatory diorama of Manhattan, and spread over more than 10,000 square feet.

== Commentary ==
After construction finished in 1974, the American Institute of Architects (AIA) gave the building an Honor Award. The AIA Guide to New York City wrote that the building was "A white, crisp elegance of aluminum and glass" and "Water Street's classiest building". Others have also praised the building; Terrence Riley called it among the most refined examples of modern design, and Robert B. Tierney, chairman of the Landmarks Preservation Commission, nominated the building for an award in 2005 (although it did not win).

== Gallery ==
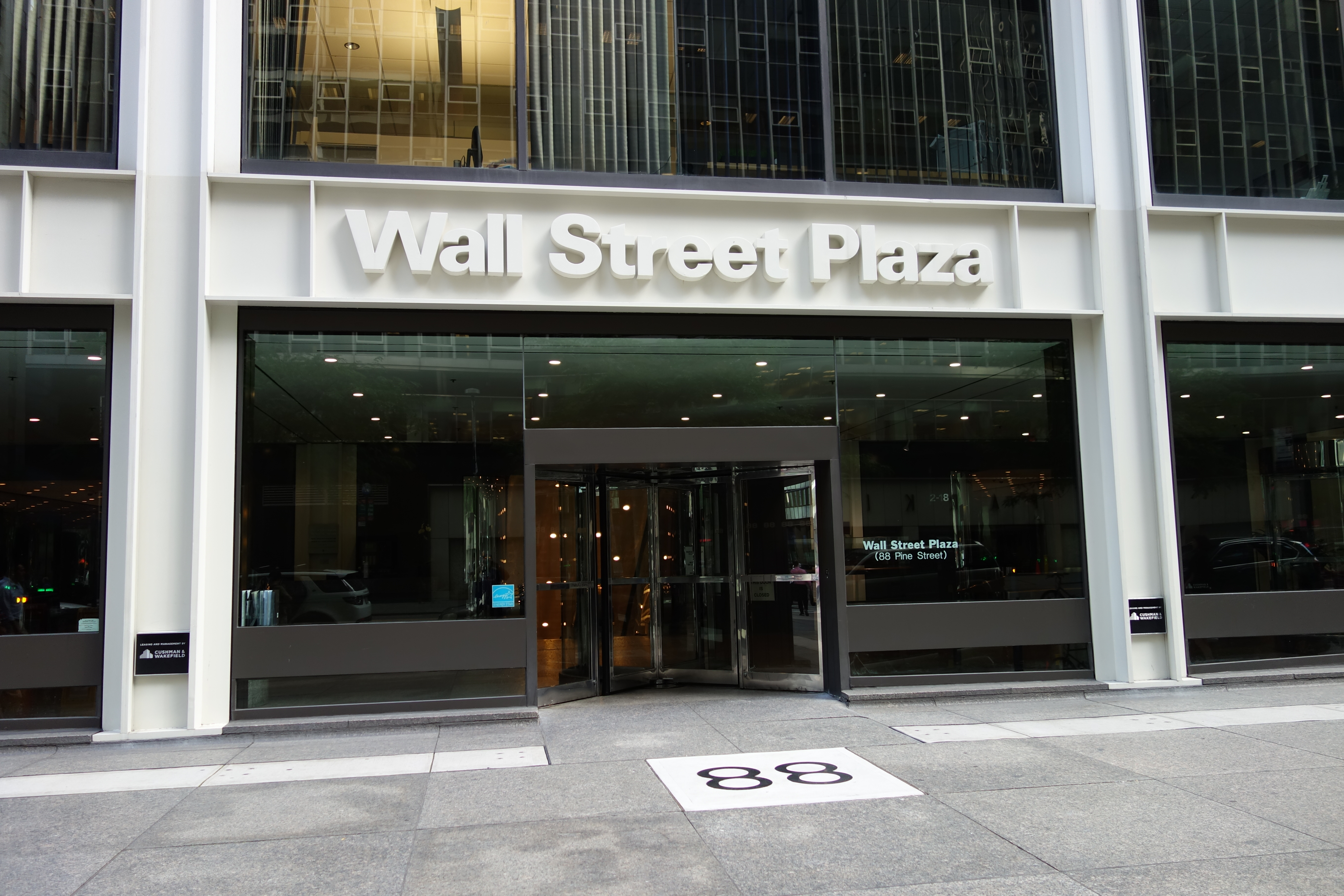
Front entrance, August 2018

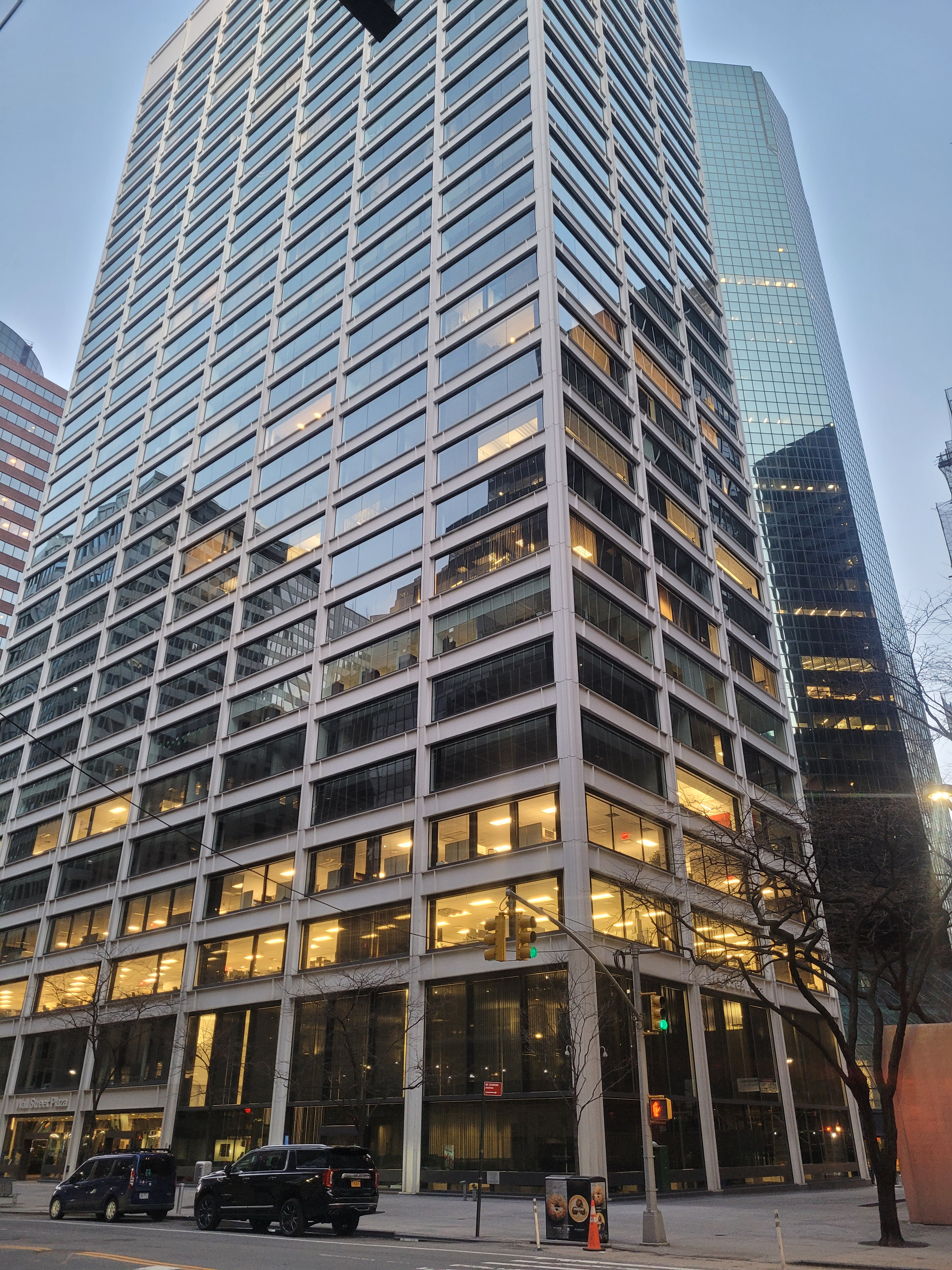
Wall Street Plaza in the early evening, from the intersection of Water and Pine St, March 2025

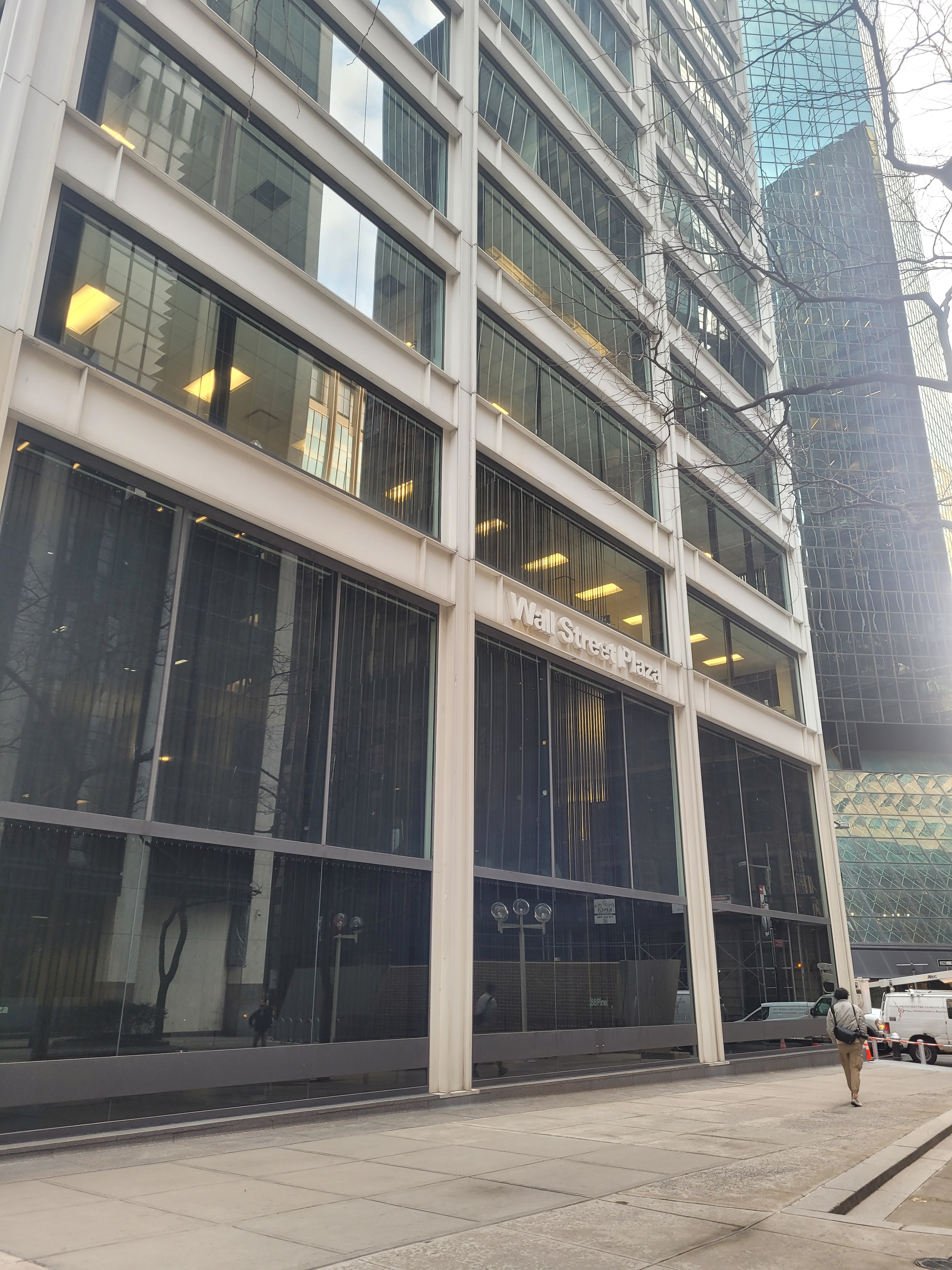
Side view of Wall Street Plaza ground floors from 88 Pine Street Plaza. Continental Center is in the far right background.

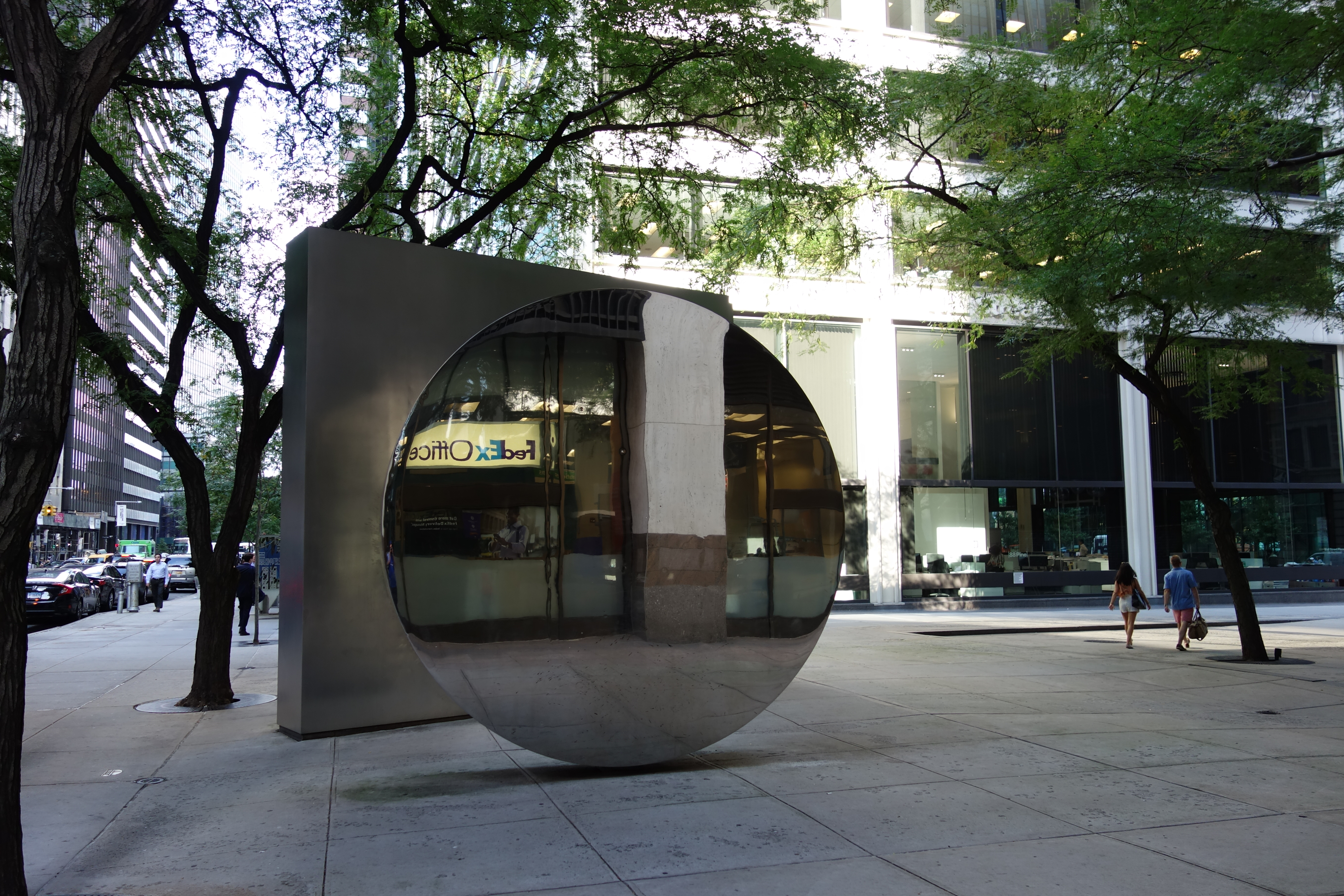
The disc and square by Yang Yuyu in the plaza outside
