= Seawise =

Seawise is a name associated with Chinese-Hong Kong shipping magnate Tung Chao-yung. It is a pun on his abbreviated name "C. Y. Tung."

- Seawise Giant, a ULCC supertanker that was the longest ship ever, salvaged by Tung's OOCL in 1970
- Seawise University, a floating university conceived of by Tung which was hosted on the RMS Queen Elizabeth
