= Orient Overseas (International) Limited =

Hong Kong, China based investment holding company

- Trade name: Orient Overseas; OOIL
- Type: Public
- Traded as: SEHK: 316
- Industry: Shipping and logistics
- Predecessor: Orient Overseas (Holdings) Limited
- Founded: 1947; 1986 (as OOIL)
- Founder: Tung Chao-yung
- Headquarters: Hong Kong, China
- Key people: Gary Jacob Yu (CEO); Lianne Chiu (COO; Kaye Alexandrine Ang, CMA (CFO)
- Owner: COSCO Shipping
- Number of employees: 10,436 (2020)
- Parent: COSCO Shipping
- Subsidiaries: Orient Overseas Line; Orient Overseas Container Line; Orient Overseas Associates

Chinese name
- Traditional Chinese: 東方海外（國際）有限公司
Transcriptions

Orient Overseas
- Traditional Chinese: 東方海外
Transcriptions

Orient Overseas (Holdings) Limited
- Traditional Chinese: 東方海外實業有限公司
Transcriptions
- Website: www.ooilgroup.com

Orient Overseas (International) Limited (OOIL) is a Hong Kong, China based investment holding company involved in international transportation and logistics, and property investment and property development. It is the parent company of Orient Overseas Container Line (OOCL), one of the world's largest container shipping companies.

== History ==
=== Orient Overseas ===
Founder of Orient Overseas, Tung Chao-yung, operated the first all-Chinese crewed ship between Hong Kong and Europe and the east coast of the United States in 1947. However, Tung Chao-yung already established his Hong Kong operation in 1937. He was the vice-president of Shipowners Association in Tianjin at that time.

Tung Chao-yung then named the company Orient Overseas Line. In 1969, the business was renamed as Orient Overseas Container Line.

The holding company of the group, Orient Overseas Container (Holdings) Limited, was incorporated on 27 February 1973. It was a listed company in Hong Kong, Far East and Kam Ngan stock exchanges since May 1973. These exchanges were merged in 1986. Jardine Matheson was a minority shareholder of the listed company.

In 1973, Orient Overseas Line purchased the passenger liner President Cleveland and renamed it Oriental President. Also in 1973, Orient Overseas commissioned the building of Wall Street Plaza (88 Pine Street), an office building in New York, as well as a nearby plaza. The building was built by I. M. Pei's company and designed by architect Jim Freed.

In 1974, Orient Overseas Container (Holdings) acquired a bulk freighter company from the Tung family's C.Y. Tung Group, for HK$43 million. In 1976, the listed company acquired additional assets from the Tung family, including two container ships and 33% shares of another container shipping company, Dart Container Service.

In 1980, Orient Overseas Container (Holdings) acquired a British shipping company, Furness, Withy & Co.

Shortly before the death of Tung Chao-yung in 1982, Tung Chee-hwa, his eldest son, succeeded to be the chairman of Orient Overseas.

In 1983, Orient Overseas Container (Holdings) Limited, was renamed to Orient Overseas (Holdings) Limited.

In February 1986, Orient Overseas (Holdings) Limited submitted a plan to the creditors for re-structuring the group of companies, including the formation of a new business unit centered on Orient Overseas Container Line Limited. In October, Crédit Commercial de France cancelled the application to the court on liquidate Orient Overseas. Orient Overseas was suspended in the Stock Exchange of Hong Kong (SEHK) due to its financial problem, which the suspension was lifted in February 1987. In the same year, Orient Overseas announced to consider to close down the oil drilling business unit. In November, the group announced to sell some subsidiaries of group, such as Kuwait Hong Kong General Insurance and others companies. The insurance and oil drilling businesses were acquired by China Merchants Group.

In May 1988, Orient Overseas acquired additional stakes in the Terminal No. 2, 4 and 6 of Kwai Tsing Container Terminals from Hongkong International Terminals Limited.

=== Orient Overseas (International) Limited ===
Orient Overseas (International) Limited (OOIL), was incorporated in Bermuda on 29 July 1986. Some time later, it became the new holding company of the group. OOIL became a listed company on 31 July 1992. OOIL's predecessor, Orient Overseas (Holdings) Limited (OOHL), ceased to become a listed company in the same year. Each OOHL's share is offered 1.08431411 shares of OOIL in exchange. Orient Overseas (Holdings) was deregistered and dissolved in 2005.

The listed company also sold the stake in Furness Withy and the Kwai Tsing Container Terminals during its restructuring. The company paid dividend again in 1994, the first time since the restructuring.

In 1996, Tung Chee-chen, Tung Chao-yung's younger son and Tung Chee-wah's younger brother, took over the chairman position of OOIL, since Tung Chee-wah's election as Chief Executive of Hong Kong.

In 2006, Orient Overseas sold four container terminals to the Ontario Teachers' Pension Plan.

In July 2017, OOIL received a US$6.3 billion take over bid from its Chinese rival, COSCO Shipping. The bid has been accepted by the Tung family, subject to shareholder and regulatory approval. The takeover was completed in 2018.

In April 2019, OOIL sold a container terminal in Long Beach to Macquarie Group for US$1.78 billion.

In May 2019, Orient Overseas Associates (the holding company in the US) backed out of a deal to lease office space at Wall Street Plaza in New York to Amnesty International. This raised speculation that interference from mainland China-headquartered COSCO Shipping was involved, as denying leases is out-of-character for building owners.
