= OOCL =

Hong Kong shipping company

Orient Overseas Container Line

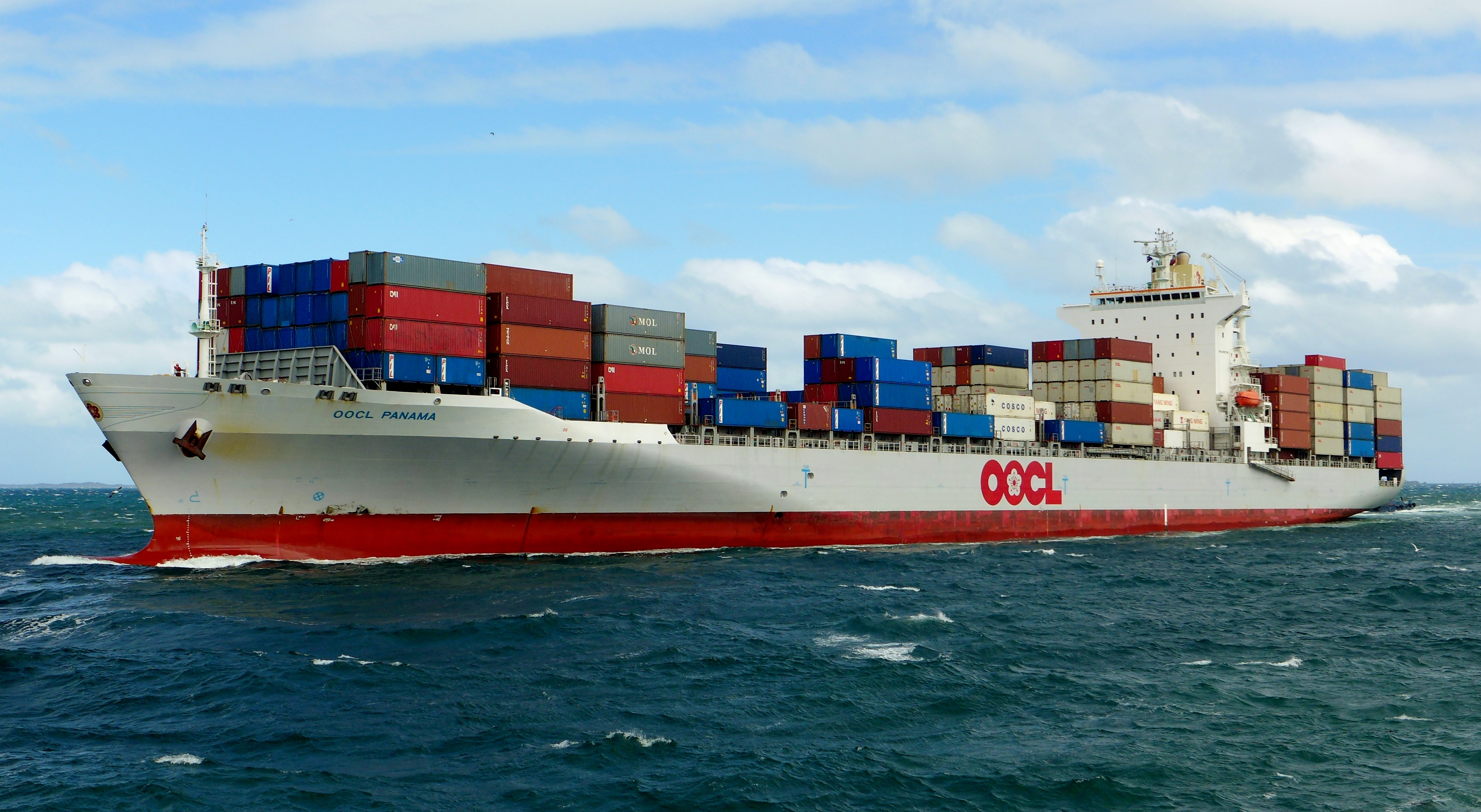
- OOCL Panama entering Fremantle Harbour in August 2015
- Type: Subsidiary
- Industry: Shipping and logistics
- Founded: 1969; 57 years ago
- Headquarters: Hong Kong, China
- Area served: Worldwide
- Key people: C. Y. Tung (founder)
- Parent: Orient Overseas (International) Limited
- Website: www.oocl.com

Orient Overseas Container Line, commonly known as OOCL, is a container shipping and logistics service company with headquarters in Hong Kong. The company is incorporated in Hong Kong as Orient Overseas Container Line Limited and separately incorporated as Orient Overseas Container Line Inc. in Liberia. The latter was also re-domiciled to the Marshall Islands.

== Overview ==
OOCL is an integrated international container transportation, logistics and terminal company with offices in 70 countries. OOCL has 59 vessels of different classes, with capacity varying from 2,992 twenty-foot equivalent units (TEU) to 21,413 TEU, including two ice-class vessels for extreme weather conditions. In 1998, OOCL became a founder member of the Grand Alliance along with Hapag-Lloyd and NYK. From 2017, has joined OCEAN Alliance along with COSCO Shipping Lines, Evergreen Marine Corporation and CMA CGM. Since 2018, the company has been acquired by COSCO Shipping Lines.

== History ==
=== Early history ===
OOCL was founded by C. Y. Tung in 1947 as the Orient Overseas Line. OOCL was the first Asian-based shipping line to transport containerized cargo across the Pacific, doing so in 1969. Consequently, the company was renamed Orient Overseas Container Line. In April 2003, OOCL took delivery of the SX-Class OOCL Shenzhen, the largest container ship ever built at the time, at 8,063 TEU. In 2006, it lost its title to the Emma Mærsk. At its peak, OOCL ran a fleet of over 150 freight ships, with a total cargo capacity exceeding 10 million tons; it was one of the world's top seven shipping lines. At one point it owned the Seawise Giant, the largest ship ever built, having bought it from the shipyard when the previous owners refused delivery.

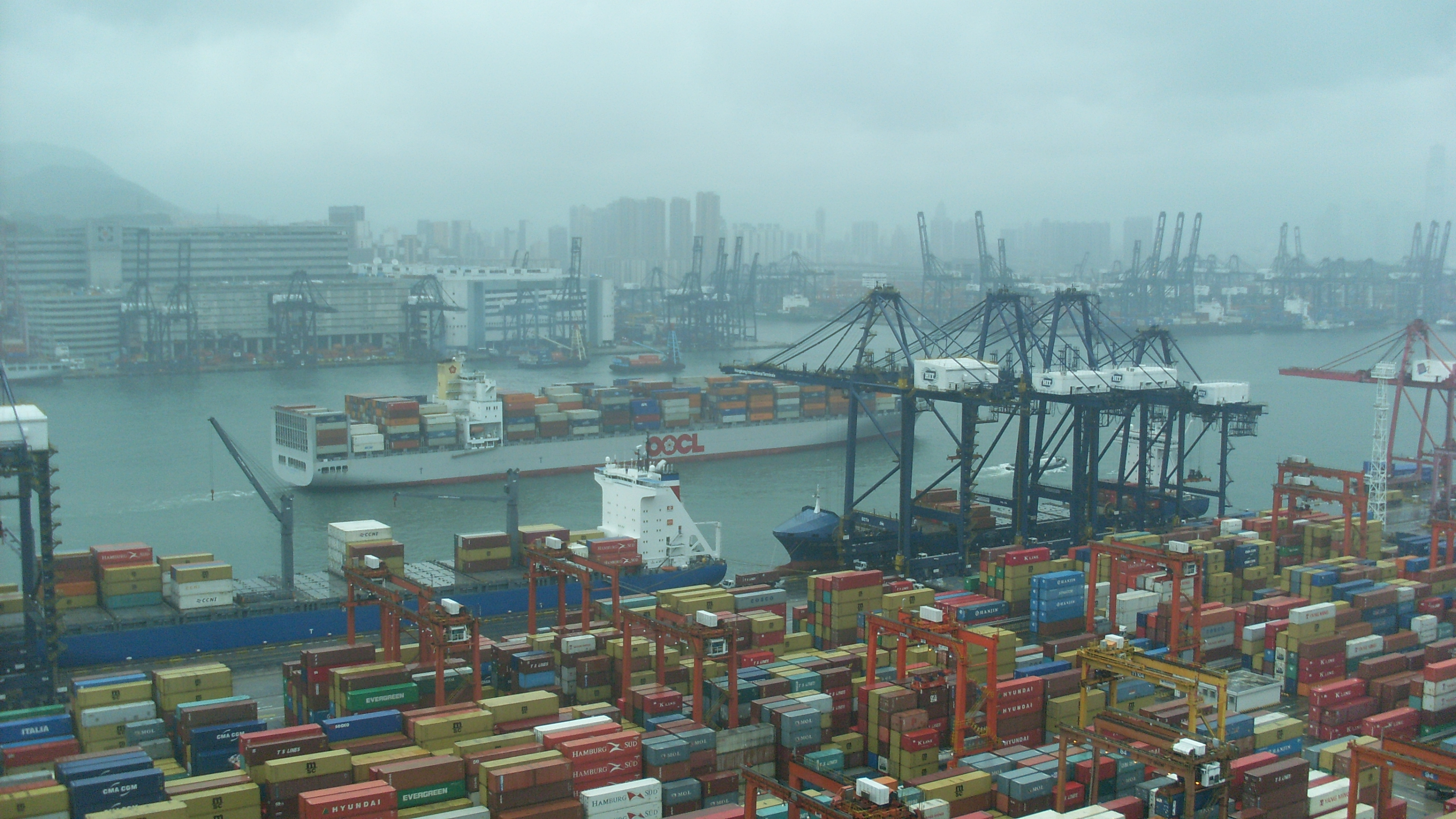
An OOCL vessel passing by CT9 (Container Terminal 9) in Hong Kong

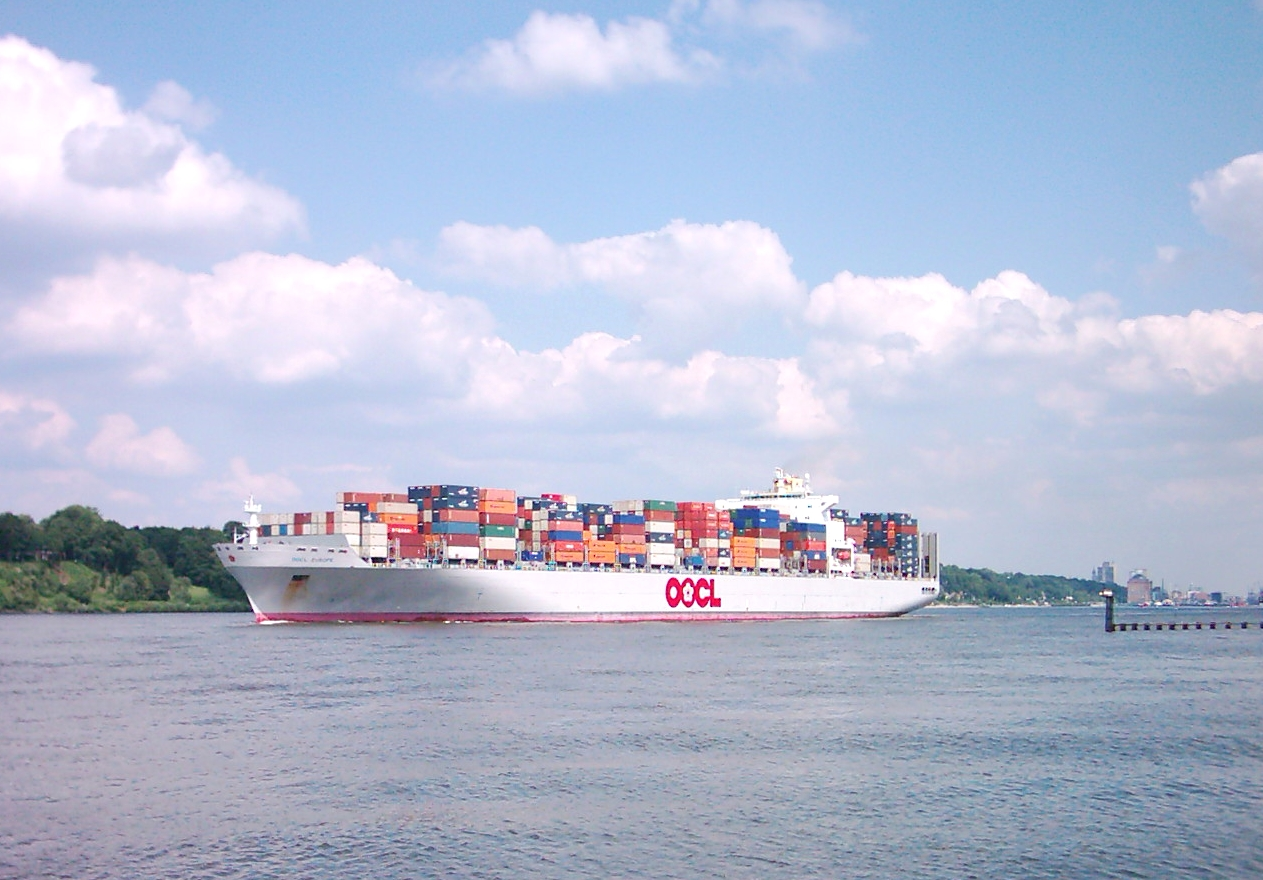
OOCL Europe on the Elbe, in Hamburg, Germany.

After C. Y. Tung's death in 1982, C.H. Tung assumed the leadership of Orient Overseas (International) Limited (OOIL), OOCL's parent company.

=== Bankruptcy and recovery ===
The company declared bankruptcy in the mid-1980s and the mainland-based Bank of China provided $50 million of the $120 million put together by Henry Fok. Another big contributor to the OOCL bailout was China Merchants, a Hong Kong arm of China's transport ministry.

In 1996, C.C. Tung took over due to C.H. Tung's election as Chief Executive of the Hong Kong Special Administrative Region.

OOCL briefly operated passenger ships acquiring the Ruahine, Rangitoto and Rangitane from the New Zealand Shipping Company that were renamed Oriental Rio, Oriental Carnival and Oriental Esmeralda to operate round the world services. The services ceased in 1976.

In September 1970, Tung purchased the ocean liner RMS Queen Elizabeth to convert it into a floating university, to be known as Seawise University, as part of the World Campus Afloat programme. On 9 January 1972, the ship caught fire during refurbishing and sank in Hong Kong's Victoria Harbour and the wreckage had to be scrapped three years later.

=== Current operations ===
In 1979, OOCL Logistics Ltd. (OLL), the OOIL Group's international freight consolidation and logistics service unit began its operation.

In recent years, OOCL has taken over a number of shipping lines. These include Furness Withy, Houlder Brothers, Manchester Liners, Shaw Savill, PSNC, Prince Line & the Alexander Shipping Company.

In 2015, OOCL ordered six G-Class container ships. The first of these, the OOCL Hong Kong, was christened on 12 May 2017. The ship became the world's first container ship to exceed 21,000 TEU mark and achieved a Guinness World Record.

In July 2017, the parent company, OOIL, received a US$6.3 billion takeover bid from COSCO Shipping. The bid was accepted subject to shareholder and regulatory approval. The takeover was completed in 2018.

On July 25, 2019, OOCL Hong Kong, the lead ship of the six G-class ships and previously the world’s largest container ship, visited Hong Kong to mark the 50th anniversary of Orient Overseas Container Line (OOCL).

In May 2023, the 24,188 TEU OOCL Spain, which is among the world's biggest container ships, made its first call at the Port of Hamburg.

In April 2026, OOCL announced a new Southeast Asia-Indian Subcontinent service. This service will be launched on April 24, 2026, and follows a port rotation of Laem Chabang, Singapore, Port Klang, Jawaharlal Nehru, Karachi, Port Klang, Singapore, and Laem Chabang.

== Operations ==
=== Area of operation ===
OOCL conducts around 78 weekly transits covering Eurasia, Africa, Oceania, and North America.

=== Container terminals ===
OOCL affiliated companies own or operate dedicated container terminals, namely Long Beach Container Terminal in California and KAOCT in Kaohsiung, Taiwan.

== Information technology ==
Beginning in 1993, the group adopted the Integrated Regional Information System (IRIS-2), specifically designed for the container shipping industry. IRIS-2 integrates the business processes of all OOCL offices, customers' shipments and financial information into one system. OOCL was a finalist for the Smithsonian Institution Award for Innovation in 1999 for its achievements with IRIS-2.

On 24 April 2018, OOCL announced an agreement with Microsoft Research Asia (MSRA) to investigate the potential of Artificial Intelligence to improve network operations and efficiencies for the shipping industry.

== Environmental considerations ==
OOCL was the first container shipping line to have achieved the Safety, Quality and Environmental (SQE) Management System certification (which consolidates the ISM-Code, ISO9001.2000 and ISO14001 requirements)

In 1992, OOCL changed the design of its refrigerated container machinery in order to eliminate the use of CFCs.

OOCL complied with the Port of Long Beach Green Flag program in 2006 and 2007. OOCL donated its rebates, totaling US$140,000, back to community projects and charities in Long Beach. From 1 January 2006, OOCL stopped using pre-1989 trucks for all port moves between Southern Californian terminals and off-dock rail ramps as part of the port's Clean Truck Program. It also complies with the Qualship 21 program, which identifies quality operation of non-US-flagged vessels.

OOCL has had a fuel saving program in place since 2001, to cut down on greenhouse gases. Initiatives to minimize fuel consumption include:

- Weather-routing systems to provide shorter routes safely
- Optimum trim (balance of cargo) and minimum ballast water
- Fuel injection and exhaust valve timing control for better efficiency
- Shaft generator and exhaust gas economizer for generating electricity
- Regular maintenance to keep the ship clean and free of marine growths such as barnacles, algae and mollusks. This maintenance includes polishing the propeller and hull, and monitoring engine performance.

OOCL conducted a Shore Power Study (in 2003) and a Sea Water Scrubber Study (in 2005) in order to identify different ways to reduce emissions, both in port and at sea.

== Community responsibility ==
The Tung OOCL Scholarship was set up in 1995 to support the continued education of young people. Currently, the Tung OOCL Scholarship comprises two programs: University Scholarship Program (China) and Employee's Children Scholarship Program. The University Scholarships have been established in six universities. They are Tsinghua University, Peking University, Fudan University, Shanghai Jiaotong University, Zhejiang University and Nanjing University. Since the establishment of the scholarship more than 2,500 undergraduate and post-graduate students have been awarded scholarships with more than US$2.3 million in funding. Every year, a selection panel is set up in each university to shortlist potential candidates, based on academic results and performance, plus active participation in extracurricular activities. Based on the same selection criteria, the Employees' Children Scholarship is awarded annually to the children of employees in all OOCL offices.

OOCL also participates in many other types of community support. One of the major and on-going projects is Project HOPE (Health Opportunities for People Everywhere). OOCL is assisting with the transportation of the latest diagnostic medical equipment and supplies from the United States (donated by global corporations) to Shanghai Children's Hospital, China.

OOCL sponsors many musicals and shows visiting the Asia-Pacific region, including Cats, Phantom of the Opera, We Will Rock You, Swan Lake on Ice, Musical Moments and Chitty Chitty Bang Bang.

== Security ==
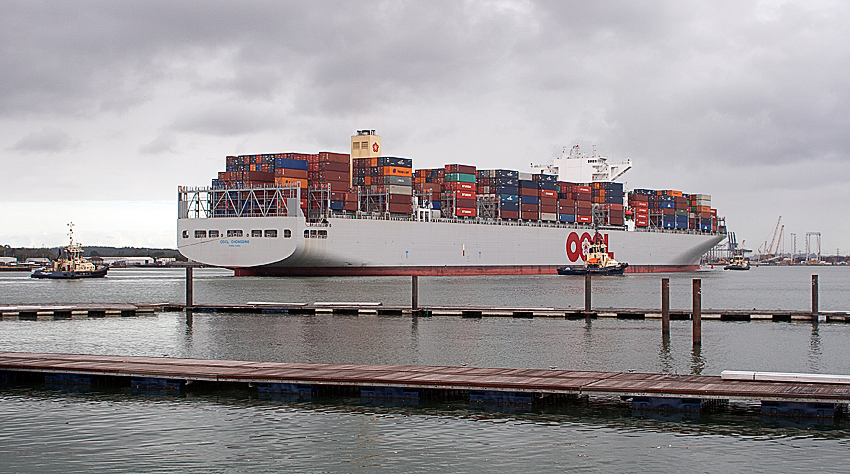
OOCL Chongqing entering Southampton shepherded by three tugs

OOCL participates in the Customs-Trade Partnership Against Terrorism program (C-TPAT).

OOCL also complies with the International Ship and Port Facility Security Code (ISPS Code). This system is based on a considerably expanded control system as stipulated in the 1974 Convention for Safety of Life at Sea (SOLAS).

The company also complies with the Container Security Initiative (CSI) and the US Customs 24-Hour Advance Cargo Manifest Declaration Rule.

== Fleet ==
Container ship classes of OOCL
Ship class	Built	Capacity (TEU)	Ships in class	Notes
S Class	1995–2000	5,344–5,770	6	
Ice Class	1998–2000	2,992–4,402	2	
SX Class	2004–2015	8,063–8,888	19	
P Class	2006–2010	4,500	18	
M Class	2013–2014	13,208	10	
G Class	2017–2018	21,413	6	OOCL Hong Kong was the world’s largest container ship when it was delivered in May 2017
TBD	2023–onwards	16,000	10	To be built at Dalian COSCO KHI Ship Engineering and Nantong COSCO KHI Ship Engineering.
TBD	2023–onwards	23,000	12	6 ships will be built at Nantong COSCO KHI Ship Engineering and 6 ships will be built at Dalian COSCO KHI Ship Engineering.
TBD	2026–2028	13,600	6	Long-term charter from Seaspan Corporation.
TBD	2027–2028	24,000	7	To be built at Nantong COSCO KHI Ship Engineering.
TBD	2028–2029	18,500	14	To be built at Dalian COSCO KHI Ship Engineering and Nantong COSCO KHI Ship Engineering.

== Accidents and incidents ==
=== RMS Queen Elizabeth Fire ===
On 9 January 1972, the RMS Queen Elizabeth caught fire during its refurbishment to be repurposed as a floating university. It ultimately sank in Hong Kong's Victoria Harbour and the wreckage had to be scrapped.

=== OOCL Finland ===
On 14 April 2011, the container ship OOCL Finland was involved in a collision in dense fog with the Russian cargo ship Tyumen-2 on the Kiel Canal near Fischerhuette, Germany. Two members of the bridge team of Tyumen-2 were killed and three were injured as a result of the collision, which damaged both vessels.

=== OOCL Durban ===
On 3 June 2021, a tower crane collapsed at Kaohsiung port, Taiwan, as a result of the container ship OOCL Durban colliding with a stationary vessel. The incident caused serious damage to the dockside gantry crane, damaging 30 to 50 containers. One dock worker sustained minor injuries, and two engineers were temporarily trapped inside the crane.

== See also ==
- Tung Chao-yung
- Tung Chee-hwa
- Seawise Giant
- RMS Queen Elizabeth
- Orient Overseas (International) Limited
- Furness Withy
- Houlder Brothers
- Shaw Savill
- Pacific Steam Navigation Company
- Manchester Liners
- Top intermodal container companies list
