= Hermine Freed =

American painter

- Hermine Freed in her work Two Faces
- Born: May 29, 1940; New York, New York
- Died: November 21, 1998 (aged 58); New York, New York
- Education: Cornell University (BA, 1961), New York University (MA, 1967)
- Known for: painting, photographer, video art
- Notable work: Art Herstory (1974)
- Spouse: James Ingo Freed

Hermine Freed (May 29, 1940 New York City–November 21, 1998 New York City), was an American painter, photographer, and video artist. She is noted for being among the first generation of artists to explore video art in the late 1960s.

== Life and work ==
Freed studied painting at Cornell University and New York University, where she taught starting from the late 1960s. In 1972 she became a professor for video art at the School of Visual Arts in New York.

She worked with colleague Andy Mann as a program editor for an NYU-sponsored series on art books for WNYC. Initially she filmed artist portraits, beginning with James Rosenquist, as well as Lee Krasner, Adolph Gottlieb, Robert Morris, Roy Lichtenstein, and Joyce Kozloff. Although WNYC did not broadcast the portrait, she was not discouraged and produced a whole series.

Apart from her documentary work she created videos that artistically negotiated female subjectivity and self-perception. In 1972 she participated in the exhibition Circuit: A Video Invitational at the Everson Museum of Art, curated by David Ross. Two Faces (1973) and Art Herstory (1974) are two of her most notable works. At the time she was an artist-in-residence at the Television Lab at WNET. In Art Herstory, Freed's technique was to add herself as a presence in various paintings selected from the male-dominated canon of eight centuries of European Art.

Freed arranged photographic fragments sourced from autobiography and various cultures, using collage to examine the notions of time, reality, and tradition, and the relationship between the historical and the contemporary. Later works included manipulated photographs of her television screen.

== Solo exhibitions ==
- 1981 Hermine Freed–Beads & Marbles - Leo Castelli Gallery, New York City, NY

== Group exhibitions ==
- 1977 Documenta 6, Kassel
- 1975 Projects: Video VI−MoMA, Museum of Modern Art, New York City, NY
- 1975 IX Paris Biennial, Paris
- 1975 Projections at the Whitney Museum
- 1975 Video Art at the Serpentine Gallery in London
- 1973 10th São Paulo Art Biennial
