= RMS Queen Elizabeth =

Ocean liner (1938–1968)

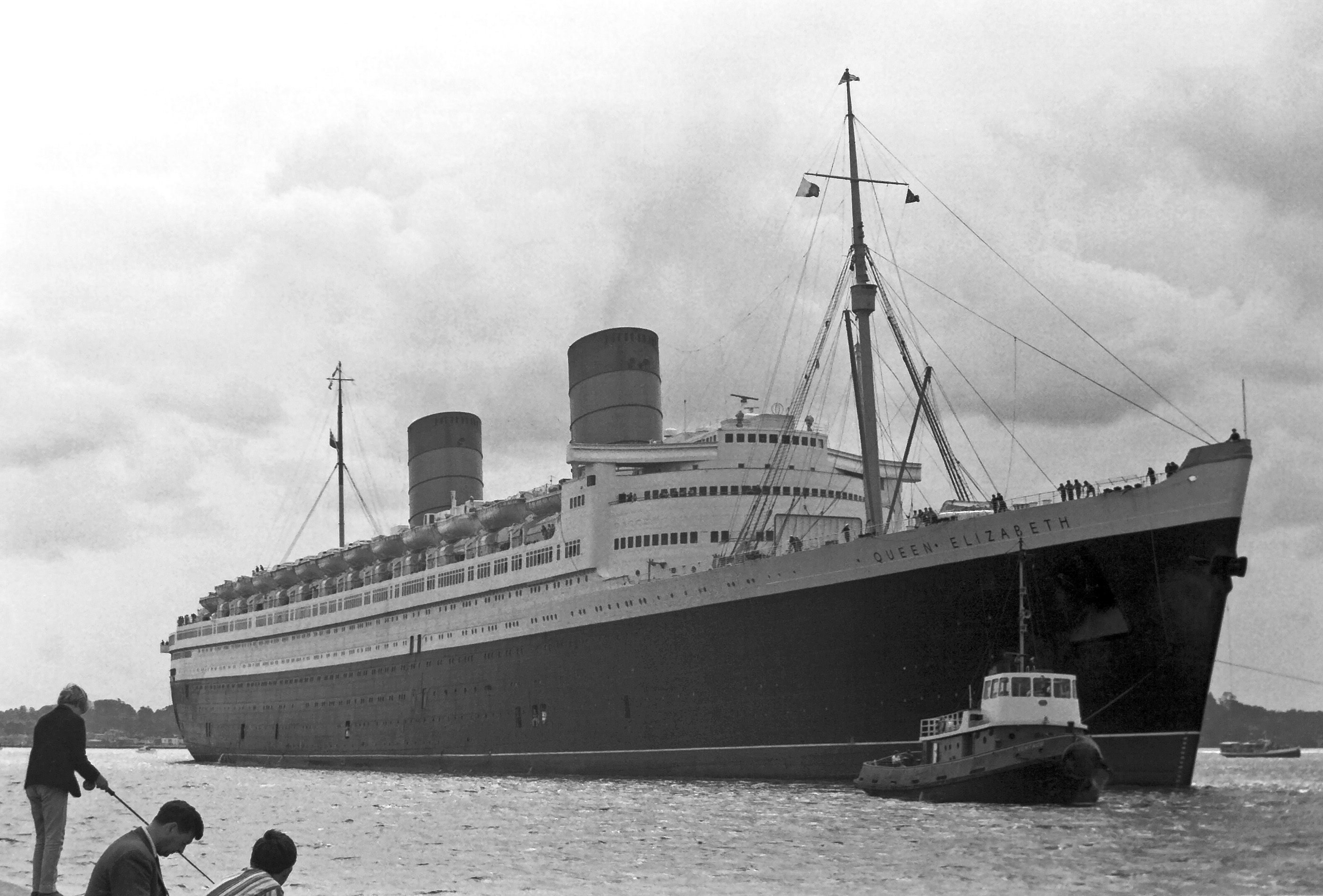
- RMS Queen Elizabeth at Southampton, England, in 1967

History

United Kingdom
- Name: 1939–1968: Queen Elizabeth; 1968–1970: Elizabeth; 1970–1972: Seawise University
- Namesake: Queen Elizabeth
- Owner: 1939–1949: Cunard White Star Line; 1949–1968: Cunard Line; 1968–1970: The Queen Corporation; 1970–1972: Orient Overseas Line
- Port of registry: Liverpool (1940–1968); Nassau (1970–1972)
- Route: Transatlantic
- Ordered: 6 October 1936
- Builder: John Brown and Company
- Yard number: 552
- Laid down: 4 December 1936
- Launched: 27 September 1938
- Completed: 2 March 1940
- Maiden voyage: 16 October 1946
- In service: 1946–1972
- Out of service: 9 January 1972
- Identification: Radio Callsign GBSS; IMO number: 5287902
- Fate: Caught fire and capsized, wreck partially dismantled between 1974–75, rest buried under land reclamation

General characteristics
- Type: Ocean liner
- Tonnage: 83,673 GRT, 41,877 NRT
- Displacement: 83,000+ tons (84331+ metric tons)
- Length: 1,031 ft (314.2 m)
- Beam: 118 ft (36.0 m)
- Height: 233 ft (71.0 m)
- Draught: 38 ft 9 in (11.8 m)
- Decks: 13
- Installed power: 12 × Yarrow boilers
- Propulsion: 4 × Parsons single-reduction geared steam turbines; 4 shafts, 200,000 shp (150 MW)
- Speed: 28.5 kn (52.8 km/h; 32.8 mph) (service)
- Capacity: 2,283 passengers
- Crew: 1,000+

RMS Queen Elizabeth was a British ocean liner operated by the Cunard Line. Along with her sister Queen Mary, she provided a weekly transatlantic service between Southampton in the United Kingdom and New York City in the United States, via Cherbourg in France.

Built by John Brown and Company at Clydebank, Scotland, as Hull 552, she was launched on 27 September 1938 and named in honour of Queen Elizabeth, the wife of King George VI. Her design was an improvement of that of Queen Mary, resulting in a vessel 12 feet (3.7 m) longer and several thousand tons greater GRT, making her the largest passenger liner ever built for a record 56 years. She entered service in March 1940 as a troopship in the Second World War, and did not make her first commercial voyage as an ocean liner until October 1946.

With the decline in popularity of the transatlantic route, both ships were replaced by the smaller, more economical Queen Elizabeth 2, which made her maiden voyage in 1969. Queen Mary was retired from service on 9 December 1967, and sold to the city of Long Beach, California. Queen Elizabeth was retired after her final crossing to New York, on 8 December 1968. She was moved to Port Everglades, Florida, and converted to a tourist attraction, which opened in February 1969. The business was unsuccessful, and closed in August 1970. Finally, the ship was sold to Hong Kong businessman Tung Chao-yung, who intended to convert her into a floating university cruise ship, Seawise University. In 1972, while she was undergoing refurbishment in Hong Kong harbour, a fire broke out aboard under unexplained circumstances, and the vessel was capsized by the water used to fight the fire. The following year, the wreck was deemed an obstruction to shipping in the area, and in 1974 and 1975 was partially scrapped on site. The remains of her hull were subsequently buried under reclaimed land used to build the Kwai Tsing Container Terminals.

== Design and construction ==
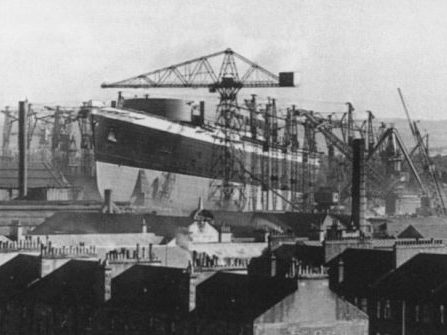
Queen Elizabeth under construction at Clydebank

On 27 May 1936, the day RMS Queen Mary sailed on her maiden voyage, Cunard's chairman, Sir Percy Bates, informed his ship designers, headed by George Paterson, that it was time to start designing the planned second ship. The official contract between Cunard and government financiers was signed on 6 October 1936.

The new ship improved upon the design of Queen Mary with sufficient changes, including a reduction in the number of boilers to twelve instead of Queen Mary's twenty-four, the designers discarded one funnel to increase deck, cargo and passenger space. The two remaining funnels were self-supporting and braced internally to give a cleaner appearance. With the forward well deck omitted, a more refined hull shape was achieved, and a sharper, raked bow was added for a third bow-anchor point. She was to be 12 ft (3.7 m) longer and 4,000 tons greater displacement than the Queen Mary. Similar improvements were done with the second Mauretania, which was a smaller fleetmate version of the Queen Mary, and later used as a model for the Queen Elizabeth.

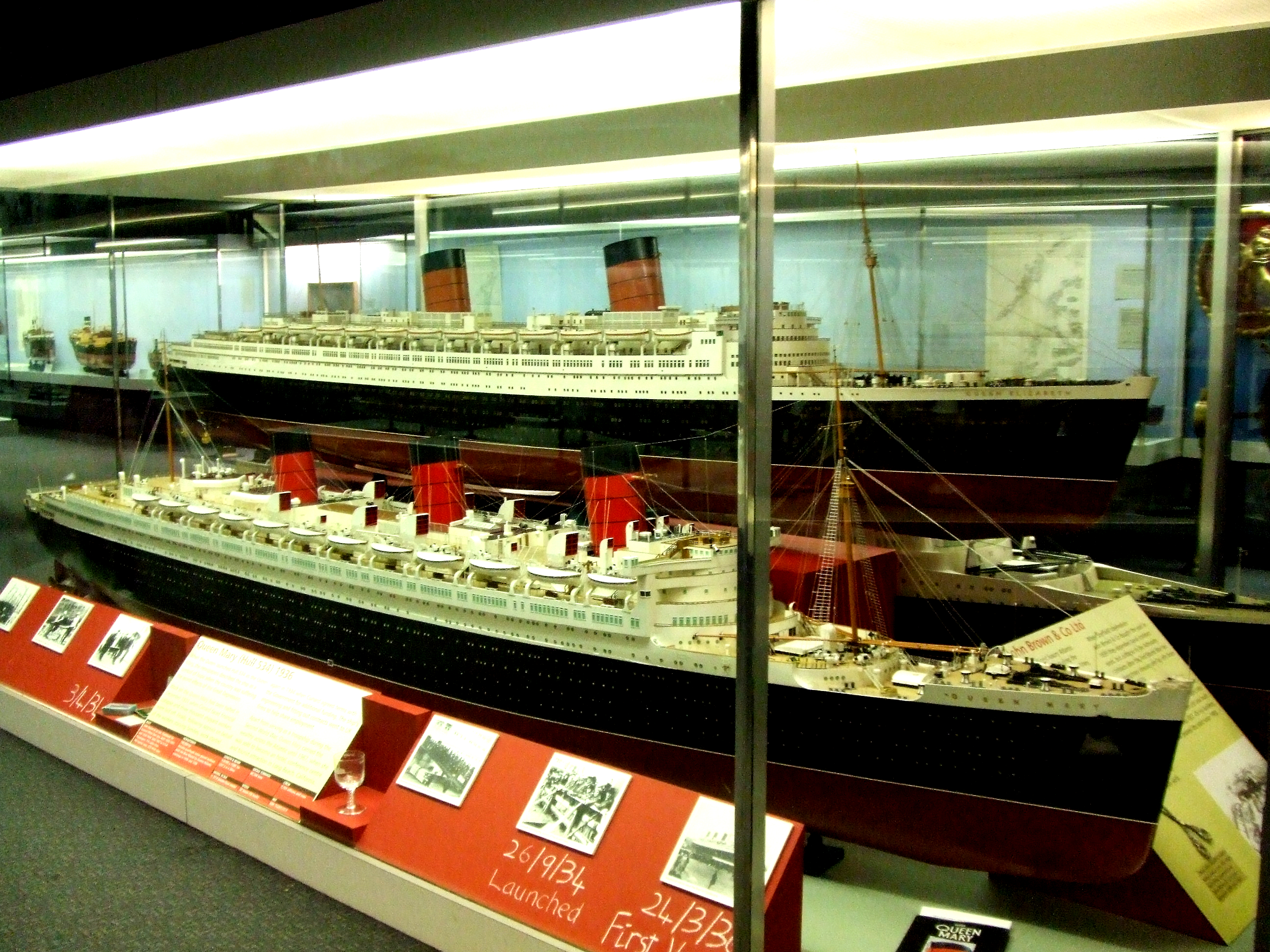
Scale models of Queen Mary (foreground) and Queen Elizabeth (background) created by John Brown & Company, on display at the Glasgow Museum of Transport

Queen Elizabeth was built on slipway four at John Brown & Company in Clydebank, Scotland, Great Britain. During the construction she was more commonly known by the shipyard number, Hull 552. The interiors were designed by a team of artists headed by the architect George Grey Wornum. The staircases, foyers and entrances were constructed by H.H. Martyn & Co. Cunard's plan was for the ship to be launched in September 1938, with fitting-out intended to be completed for her to enter service in the spring of 1940. Queen Elizabeth herself performed the launching ceremony on 27 September 1938. Supposedly, the liner started to slide into the water before the Queen could officially launch her, and acting quickly, she managed to smash a bottle of Australian red over the ship's bow just before it slid out of reach. The liner was then docked for fitting out. It was announced that on 23 August 1939 King George VI and Queen Elizabeth were to visit the ship and tour the engine room and that 24 April 1940 was to be the proposed date of her maiden voyage. Due to the outbreak of the Second World War, these two events were postponed and Cunard's plans were cancelled.

Queen Elizabeth sat at the fitting-out dock at the shipyard painted in Cunard colours until 2 November 1939, when the Ministry of Shipping issued special licences to declare her seaworthy. On 29 December the engines were tested for the first time, running from 09:00 to 16:00 with the propellers disconnected to monitor her oil and steam operating temperatures and pressures. Two months later Cunard received instructions from the government, ordering the ship to leave Clydeside as soon as possible and "to keep away from the British Isles as long as the order was in force".

== Second World War ==
At the start of the Second World War, it was decided that the Queen Elizabeth was so vital to the war effort that she must not have her movements tracked by German spies in the Clydebank area. An elaborate ruse suggested to any German observers that she would sail to Southampton to complete her fitting-out. Another factor prompting the ship's departure was the necessity to clear the fitting-out berth at the shipyard for the battleship HMS Duke of York, for final fitting-out, as only it could accommodate the King George V-class battleships.

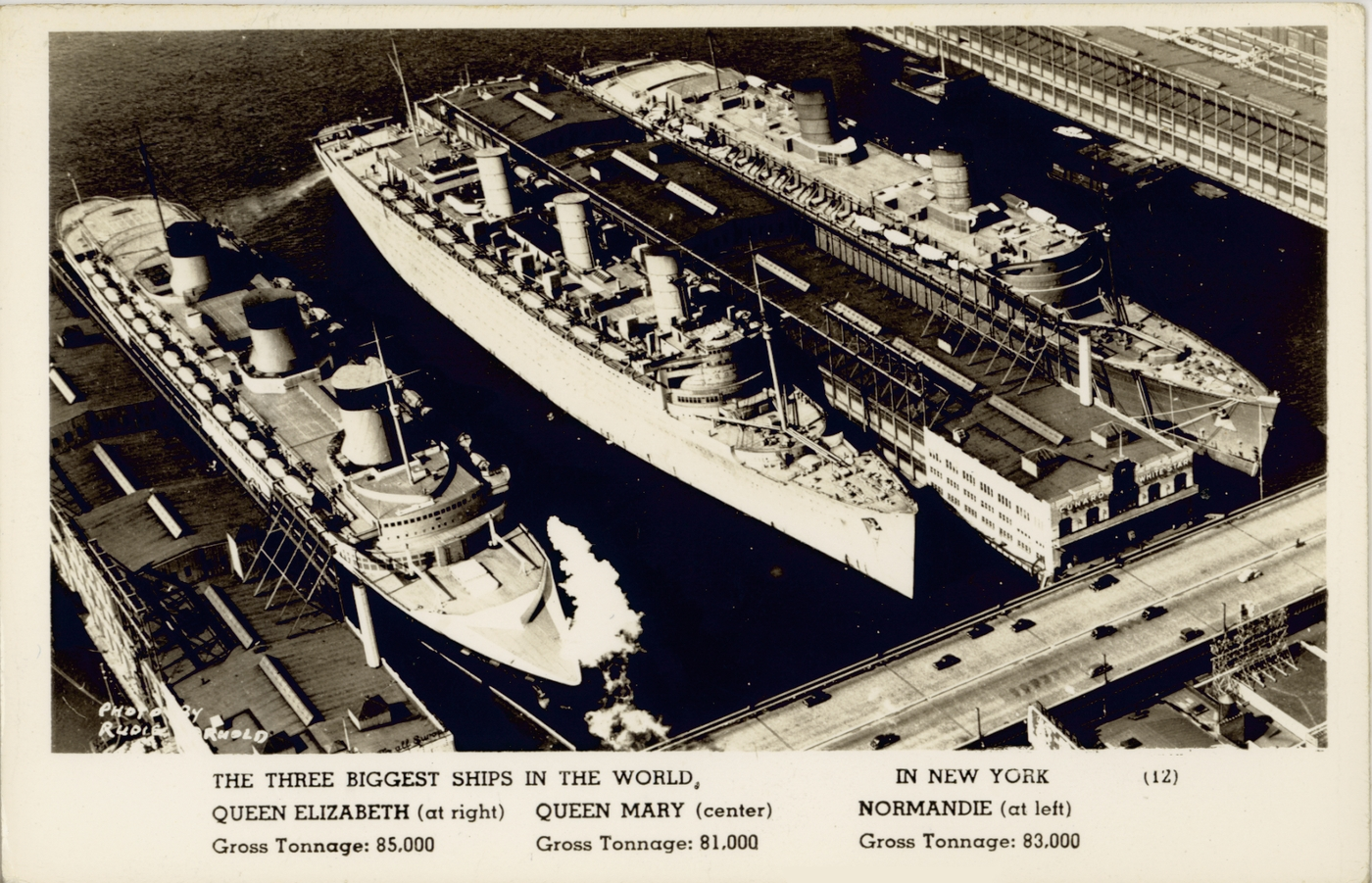
Normandie, Queen Mary and Queen Elizabeth at New York Harbor in 1940

One major factor that limited the ship's departure date was that there were only two spring tides that year high enough for Queen Elizabeth to leave the Clydebank shipyard, known also by German intelligence. A minimal crew of four hundred were assigned for the trip; most were transferred from Aquitania and told that this would be a short coastal voyage to Southampton, but to pack for six months. Parts were shipped to Southampton, and preparations were made to move the ship into the King George V Graving Dock when she arrived. The names of Brown's shipyard employees were booked to local hotels in Southampton, and Captain John Townley, who had previously commanded Aquitania on one voyage and several of Cunard's smaller vessels, was appointed as her first master.

By the beginning of March 1940, Queen Elizabeth was ready to move; the ship had been fuelled, and adjustments to her compass were made, along with some final testing of equipment. The Cunard colours were painted over with battleship grey, and on the morning of 3 March, the ship quietly left her moorings in the Clyde and proceeded out of the river, where she was met by a King's Messenger, who presented sealed orders directly to the captain.

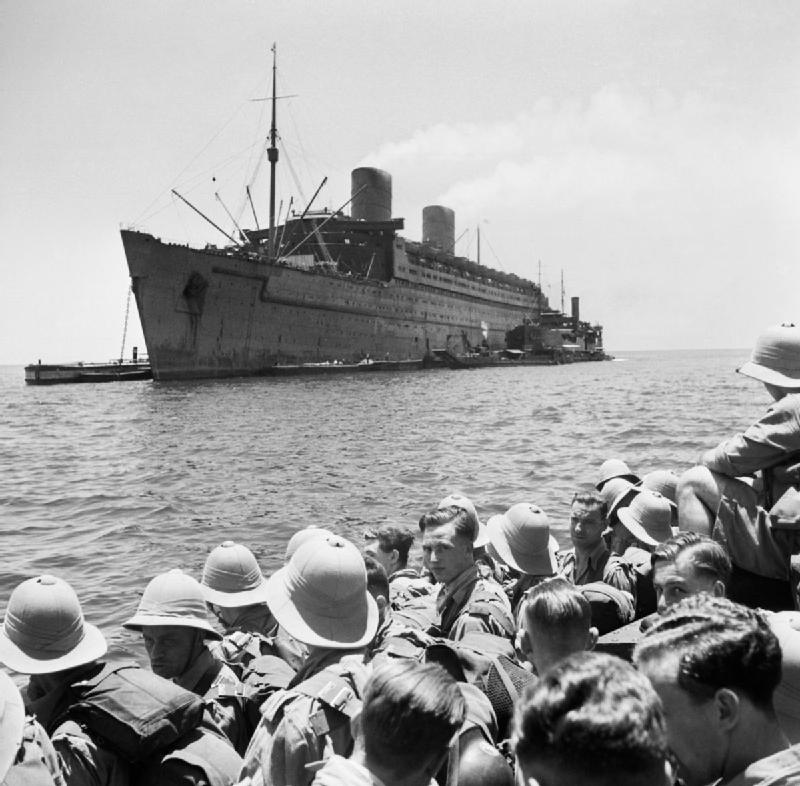
Queen Elizabeth painted in wartime grey, having just transported troops to the Middle East in 1942

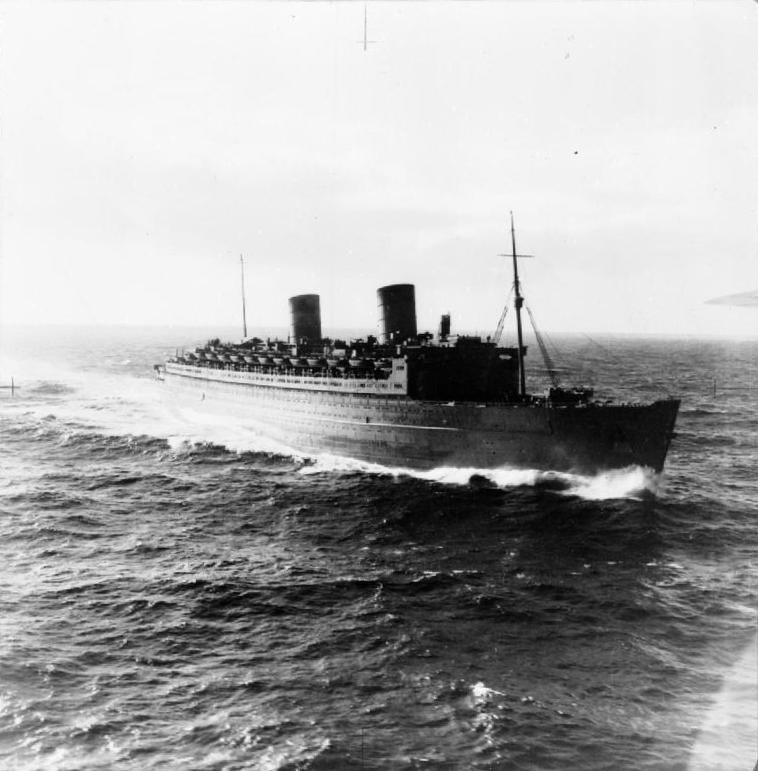
RMS Queen Elizabeth as a troopship during World War II

They were to take the ship directly to New York, in the neutral United States, not to stop or even slow to drop off the Southampton harbour pilot who had embarked on at Clydebank, and to maintain strict radio silence. Later that day, when she was due to arrive at Southampton, the city was bombed by the Luftwaffe.

Queen Elizabeth zigzagged across the Atlantic to elude German U-boats and took six days to reach New York at an average speed of 26 kn (48 km/h). There she found herself moored alongside both Queen Mary and the French Line's Normandie, the only time the world's three largest ocean liners were ever berthed together. The three ships remained together for two weeks before Queen Mary departed for Sydney, Australia. Captain Townley received two telegrams on his arrival in New York, one from his wife, and the other from Her Majesty Queen Elizabeth thanking him for the vessel's safe delivery. The ship was then secured so that no one could board her without prior permission, including port officials.

Queen Elizabeth left the port of New York on 13 November 1940, for Singapore to receive her troopship conversion. After two stops to refuel and replenish her stores in Trinidad and Cape Town, she arrived in Singapore's naval docks, where she was fitted with anti-aircraft guns, and her hull repainted grey.

Queen Elizabeth left Singapore on 11 February 1941, and on 23 February 1942, secretly arrived in Esquimalt, British Columbia, Canada. She underwent refit work in drydock adding accommodation and armaments, and three hundred naval ratings quickly painted the hull. In mid-March, carrying 8,000 American soldiers, Queen Elizabeth began a 6,700-nautical-mile (7,700 mi; 12,400 km) voyage from San Francisco to Sydney, Australia. She then carried Australian troops to theatres of operation in Asia and Africa. After 1942, the two Queens were relocated to the North Atlantic for the transportation of American troops to Europe. Their high speeds allowed them to outrun hazards, principally German U-boats, usually allowing them to travel outside a convoy and without escort. Nevertheless, Queen Elizabeth was the target of U-704, which fired four torpedoes at her on 9 November 1942. The commander, Horst Wilhelm Kessler, heard a detonation and Nazi radio propaganda claimed she was sunk. In reality, one of the torpedoes detonated prematurely and the ship was unharmed.

During her war service, Queen Elizabeth carried more than 750,000 troops, and sailed some 430,000 nautical miles (490,000 mi; 800,000 km).

== As a liner ==
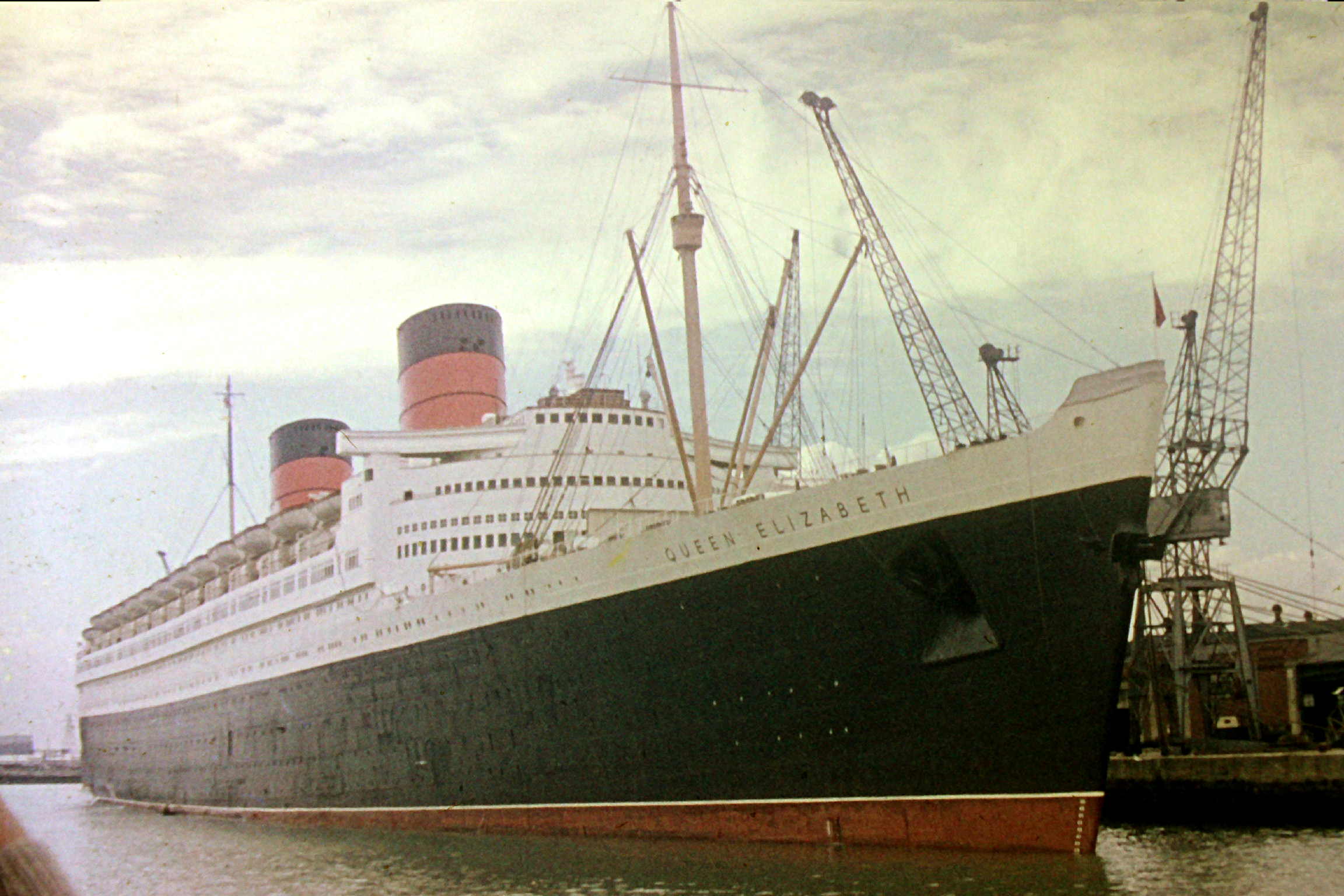
RMS Queen Elizabeth at Southampton, England, in 1960

Following the end of the Second World War, Queen Elizabeth was refitted and furnished as an ocean liner, while her running mate Queen Mary remained in her wartime role and grey appearance except for her funnels, which were repainted in the company's colours. For another year, her sibling did military service, returning troops and G.I. brides to the United States while Queen Elizabeth was overhauled at the Firth of Clyde Drydock, in Greenock, by the John Brown Shipyard.

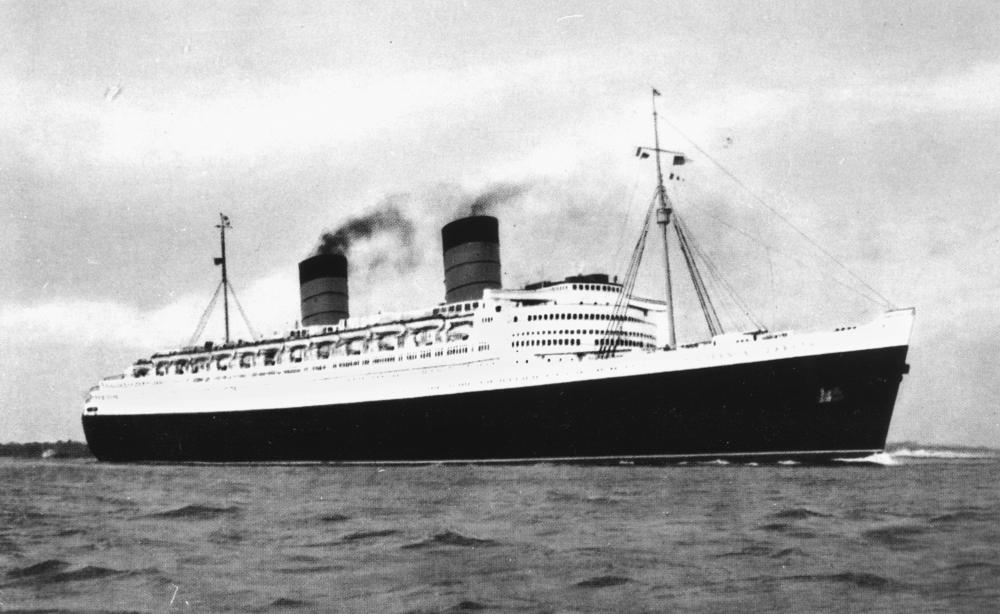
RMS Queen Elizabeth

Six years of war service had never permitted the formal sea trials to take place, so they were now finally undertaken. Under the command of Commodore Sir James Bisset, the ship travelled to the Isle of Arran to carry them out. On board was the ship's namesake, Queen Elizabeth, and her two daughters, Princesses Elizabeth and Margaret. During the trials, Queen Elizabeth took the wheel for a brief time, and the two young princesses recorded the two measured runs with stopwatches that they had been given for the occasion. Bisset was under strict instructions from Sir Percy Bates, who was also aboard the trials, that all that was required from the ship was two measured runs of no more than 30 knots and that she was not permitted to attempt to attain a higher speed record than Queen Mary. Queen Elizabeth's engines were capable of driving her to speeds of over 32 knots. After her trials Queen Elizabeth finally entered passenger service, allowing Cunard White Star to launch the long-planned two-ship weekly service to New York. Despite specifications similar to those of Queen Mary, Queen Elizabeth never held the Blue Riband, for Cunard White Star chairman Sir Percy Bates asked that the two ships not to compete against each other.

The ship ran aground on a sandbank off Southampton on 14 April 1947, and was re-floated the following day.

In 1955, during an annual overhaul at Southampton, England, Queen Elizabeth was fitted with underwater fin stabilisers to smooth the ride in rough seas. Two retractable fins were fitted on each side of the hull, allowing fuel savings in smooth seas and during docking. On 29 July 1959, she was in a collision with the American freighter American Hunter in foggy conditions in New York Harbor and was holed above the waterline.

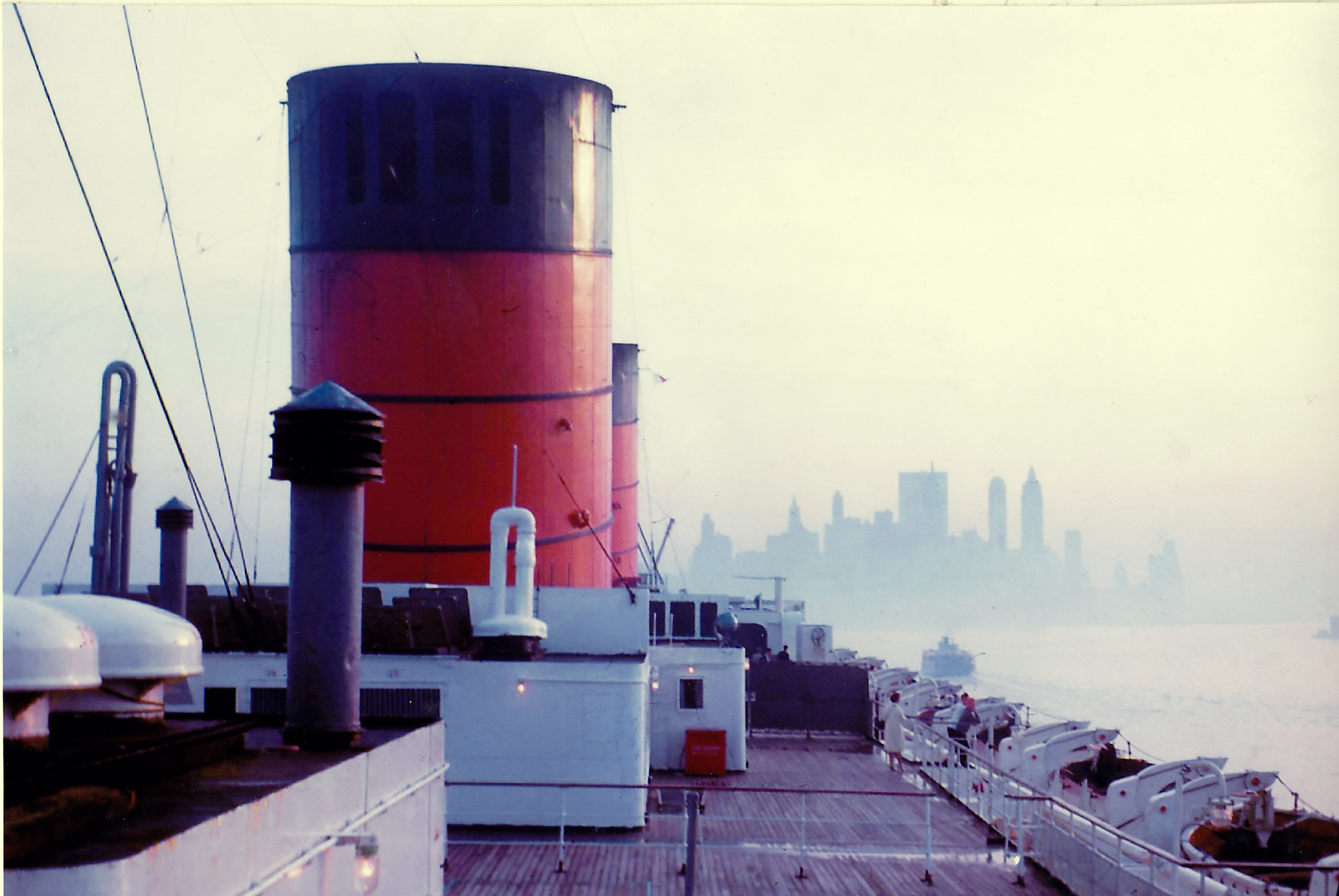
In New York Harbor approaching Manhattan, 1965

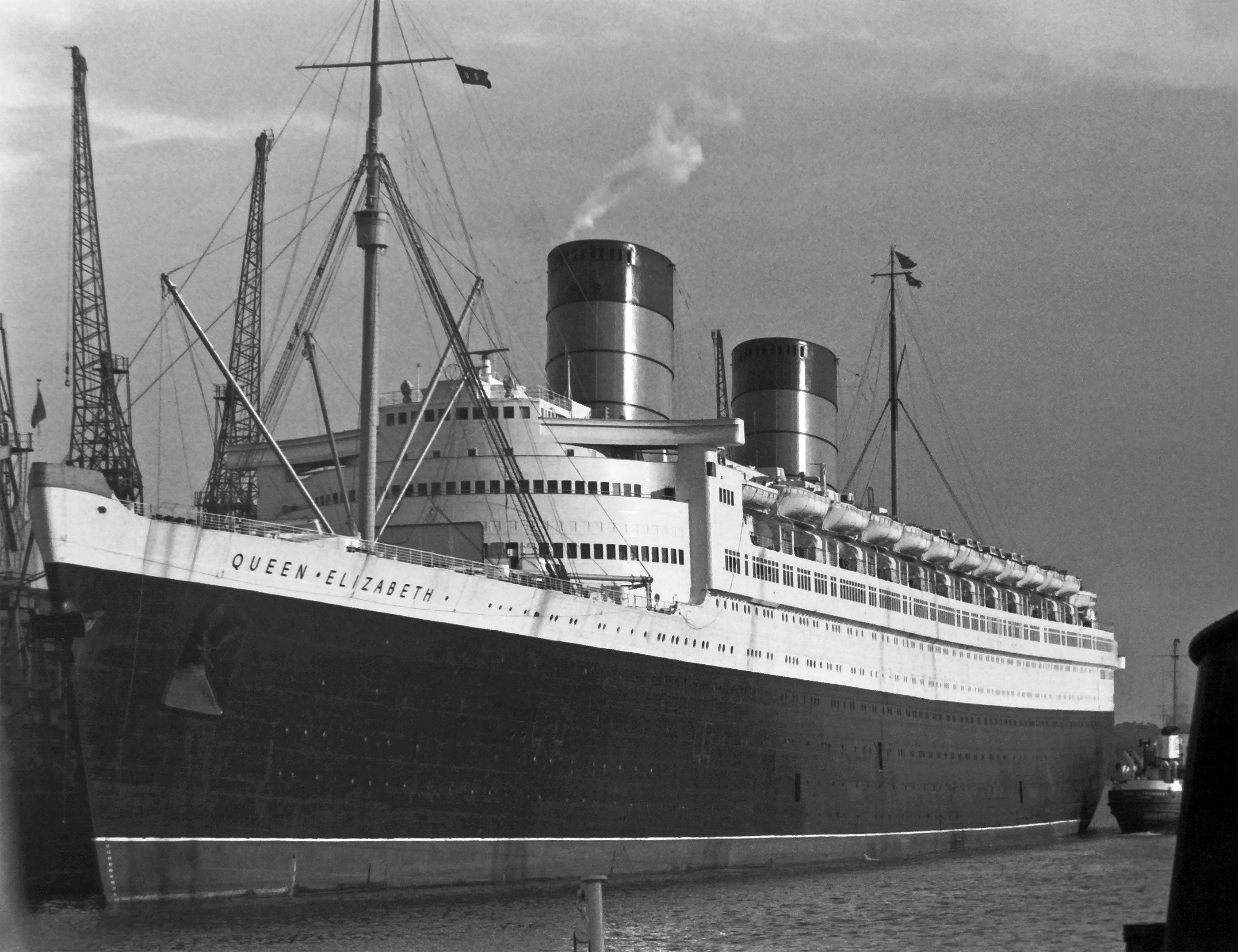
RMS Queen Elizabeth at Southampton in 1967

Together with Queen Mary and in competition with the American liners SS United States and SS America, Queen Elizabeth dominated the transatlantic passenger trade until their fortunes began to decline with the advent of the faster and more economical jet airliner in the late 1950s. As passenger numbers declined, the liners became uneconomic to operate in the face of rising fuel and labour costs. For a short time the Queen Elizabeth, then under the command of Commodore Geoffrey Trippleton Marr, attempted a dual role of alternating her usual transatlantic route with cruising between New York and Nassau, Bahamas. For this new tropical excursion the ship received a major refit in 1965, with a new Lido deck added to her aft section, enhanced air conditioning, and an outdoor swimming pool. With these improvements, Cunard intended to keep the ship in operation until at least the mid-1970s. However, the strategy did not prove successful, owing to the ship's deep draught, which prevented her from entering various island ports, and high fuel costs. She was also too wide for transiting the Panama Canal, limiting travel to the Pacific.

Cunard retired Queen Mary in 1967 and Queen Elizabeth upon her final Atlantic crossing to New York on 5 November 1968. The two liners were replaced with the new, smaller, more economical Queen Elizabeth 2.

== Final years ==
In late 1968, Queen Elizabeth was sold to the Elizabeth Corporation, with 15% of the company controlled by a group of Philadelphia businessmen and 85% retained by Cunard. The new company intended to operate the ship as a hotel and tourist attraction in Port Everglades, Florida, similar to the planned use of Queen Mary in Long Beach, California. Elizabeth, as she was now called, arrived in Port Everglades on 8 December 1968 and opened to tourists in February 1969, well before Queen Mary, which opened two years later, in 1971. The vessel was sold to Queen Ltd of Port Everglades on 19 July 1969. However, Queen Elizabeth's retirement in Florida was not to last. The climate of southern Florida was much harder on the ship than the climate of southern California was on Queen Mary. There was some talk of permanently flooding the bilge and allowing Queen Elizabeth to rest on the bed of the Intracoastal Waterway in Ft. Lauderdale harbour (Port Everglades) and remain open, but the ship was forced to close in August 1970, after losing money and being declared a fire hazard. The vessel was sold at auction in 1970 to Hong Kong tycoon Tung Chao Yung.

Tung, the head of the Orient Overseas Line, intended to convert the vessel into a university for the World Campus Afloat program (later reformed and renamed Semester at Sea). Following the tradition of the Orient Overseas Line, the ship was renamed Seawise University.

The ship was under Hong Kong ownership, and sailed for Hong Kong on 10 February 1971. This was ill-advised, as the ship's engines and boilers were in poor condition after several years of neglect. The retired Commodore Marr and a former chief engineer of the ship were hired by Tung as advisors for the journey to Hong Kong. Marr recommended that Seawise University be towed to the New Territories, but Tung and his crew were convinced that they could get there using just the aft engines and boilers. The planned several-week trip turned into months as the crew battled with boiler problems and a fire. An unplanned lengthy mid-voyage stopover allowed the new owners to fly spare parts out to the ship and carry out repairs before resuming course, arriving in Hong Kong Harbour in July 1971.

But, with the £5 million conversion nearing completion, the vessel caught fire on 9 January 1972. These fires were set deliberately, as several blazes broke out simultaneously throughout the ship and a later court of inquiry handed down a cause of arson by person or persons unknown. The fact that Tung had acquired the vessel for $3.5 million, and had insured it for $8 million, led some to speculate that the inferno was part of a fraud to collect on the insurance claim. Others speculated that the fires were the result of a conflict between Tung, a Chinese Nationalist, and Communist-dominated ship construction unions.

The ship rolled on its side from the water sprayed on her by fireboats, then settled on the bottom of Victoria Harbour. The vessel was finally declared a shipping hazard and dismantled for scrap between December 1974 and 1975. Portions of the hull that were not salvaged, as well as the keel, boilers and engines, remained at the bottom of the harbour, and the area was marked as "Foul" on local sea charts, warning ships not to try to anchor there. It is estimated that around 40–50% of the wreck was still on the seabed. In the late 1990s, the last remains of the wreck were buried during land reclamation for the construction of Container Terminal 9. The position of the wreck is 22°19′43″N 114°06′44″E.

After the fire, Tung had one of the liner's anchors and the metal letters "Q" and "E" from the name on the bow placed in front of the office building at Del Amo Fashion Center in Torrance, California, which had been intended as the headquarters of the Seawise University venture; they later went on display with commemorative plaques in the lobby of Wall Street Plaza (88 Pine Street), New York City. Two of the ship's fire warning system brass plaques were recovered by a dredger, and were displayed at The Aberdeen Boat Club in Hong Kong in an exhibit about the ship. The charred remnants of her last ensign were cut from the flagpole and framed in 1972, and still adorn the wall of the officers' mess of marine police HQ in Hong Kong. Parker Pen Company produced a special edition of 5,000 pens made from material recovered from the wreck, each in a presentation box; today these are highly collectible.

Following the demise of Queen Elizabeth, the largest passenger ship in active service became the 66,343 GRT SS France, which was longer but with less tonnage than the Cunard liner. Queen Elizabeth held the record of largest passenger ship ever built until the 101,353 GT Carnival Destiny (later Carnival Sunshine) was launched in 1996. To date, Queen Elizabeth still holds the record as the largest passenger ship for the longest period of time: 56 years.

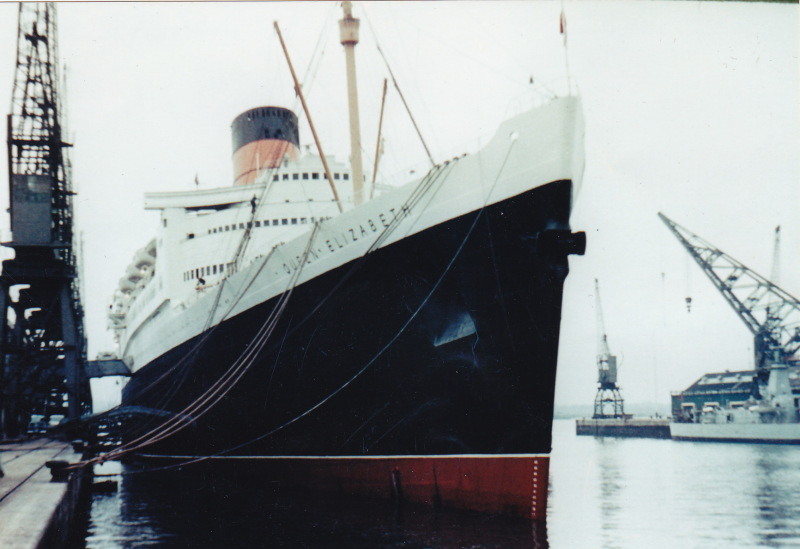
RMS Queen Elizabeth at Southampton in 1968

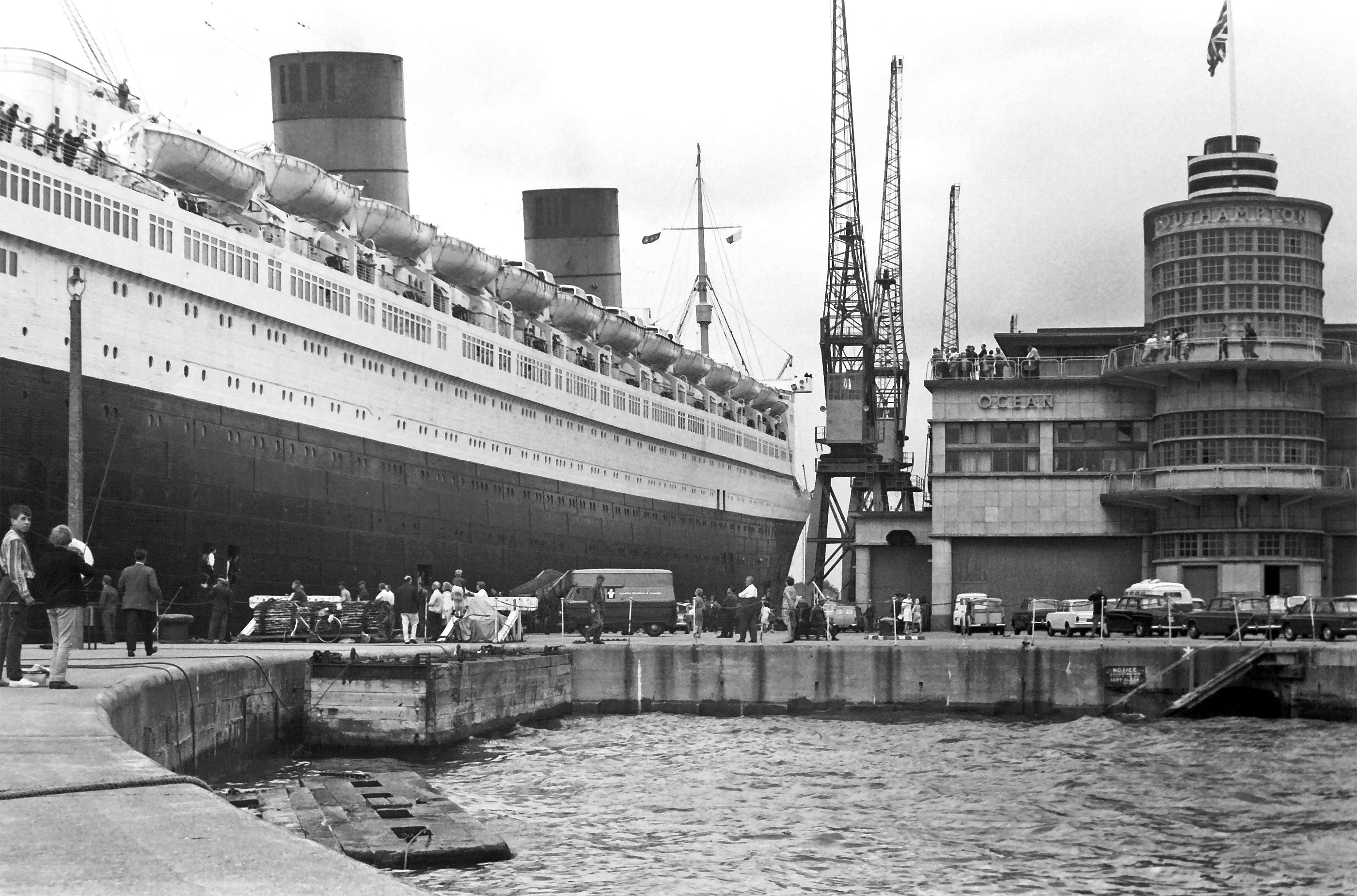
Queen Elizabeth docked at Southampton in 1967

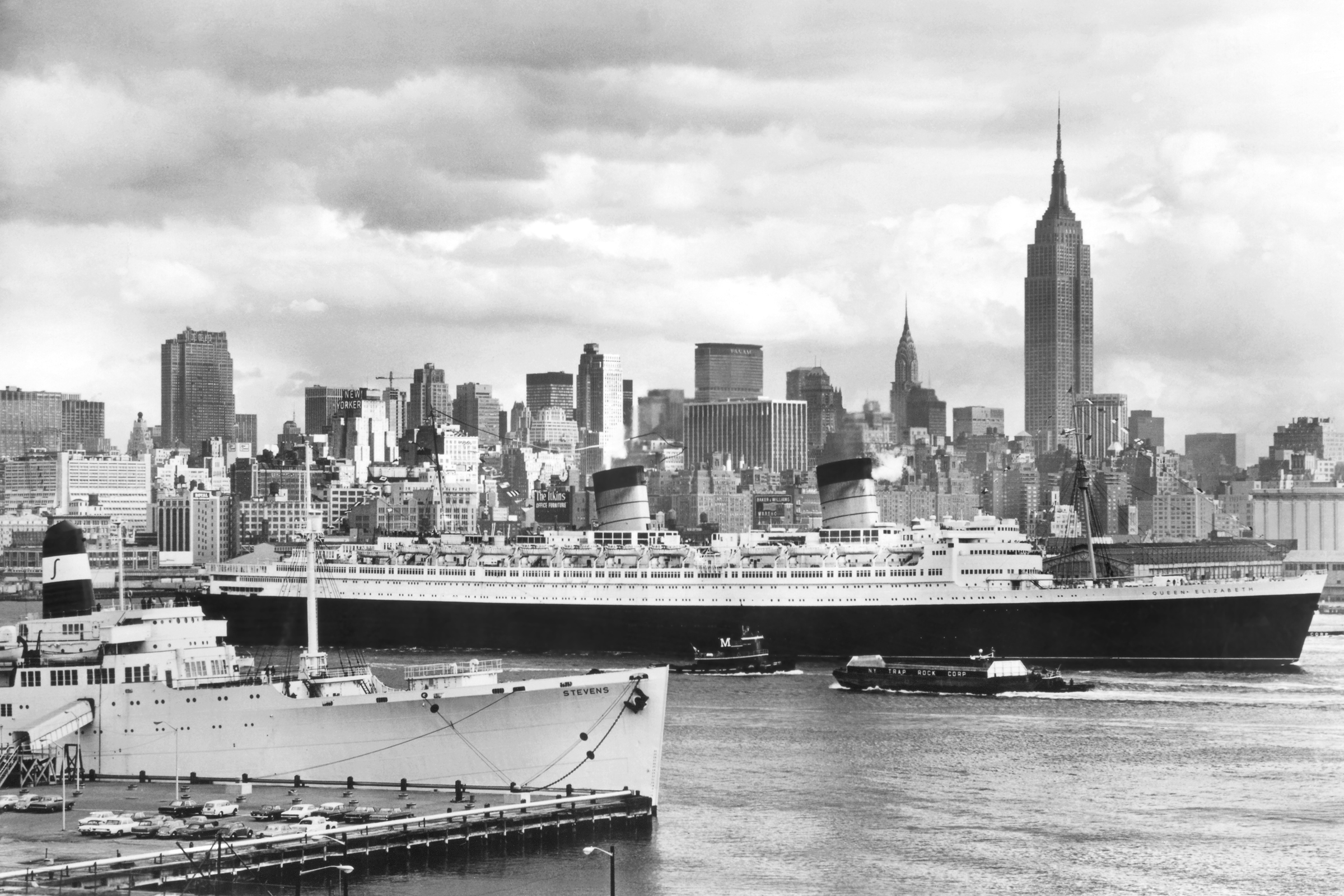
Queen Elizabeth leaving New York during her last voyage, 1968

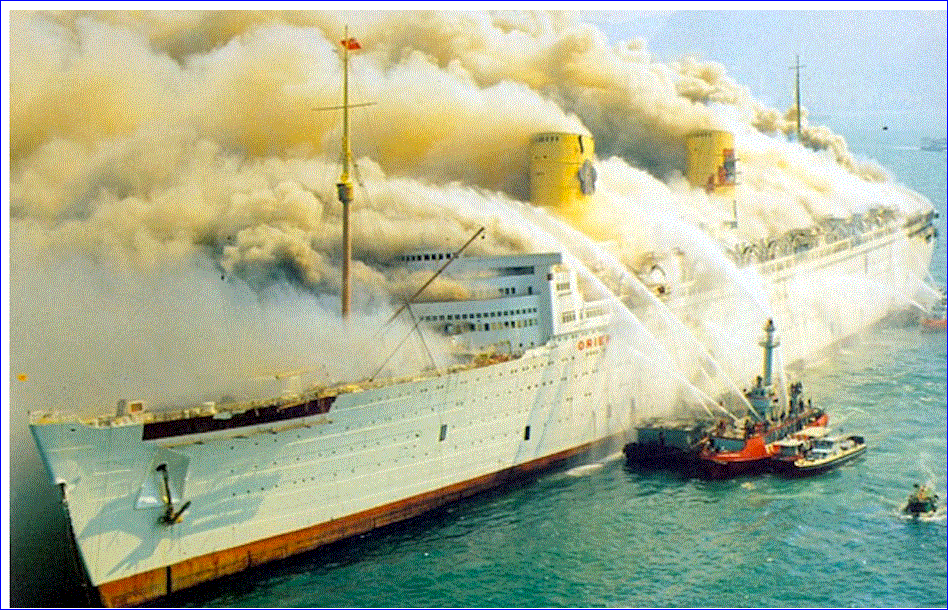
Seawise University on fire

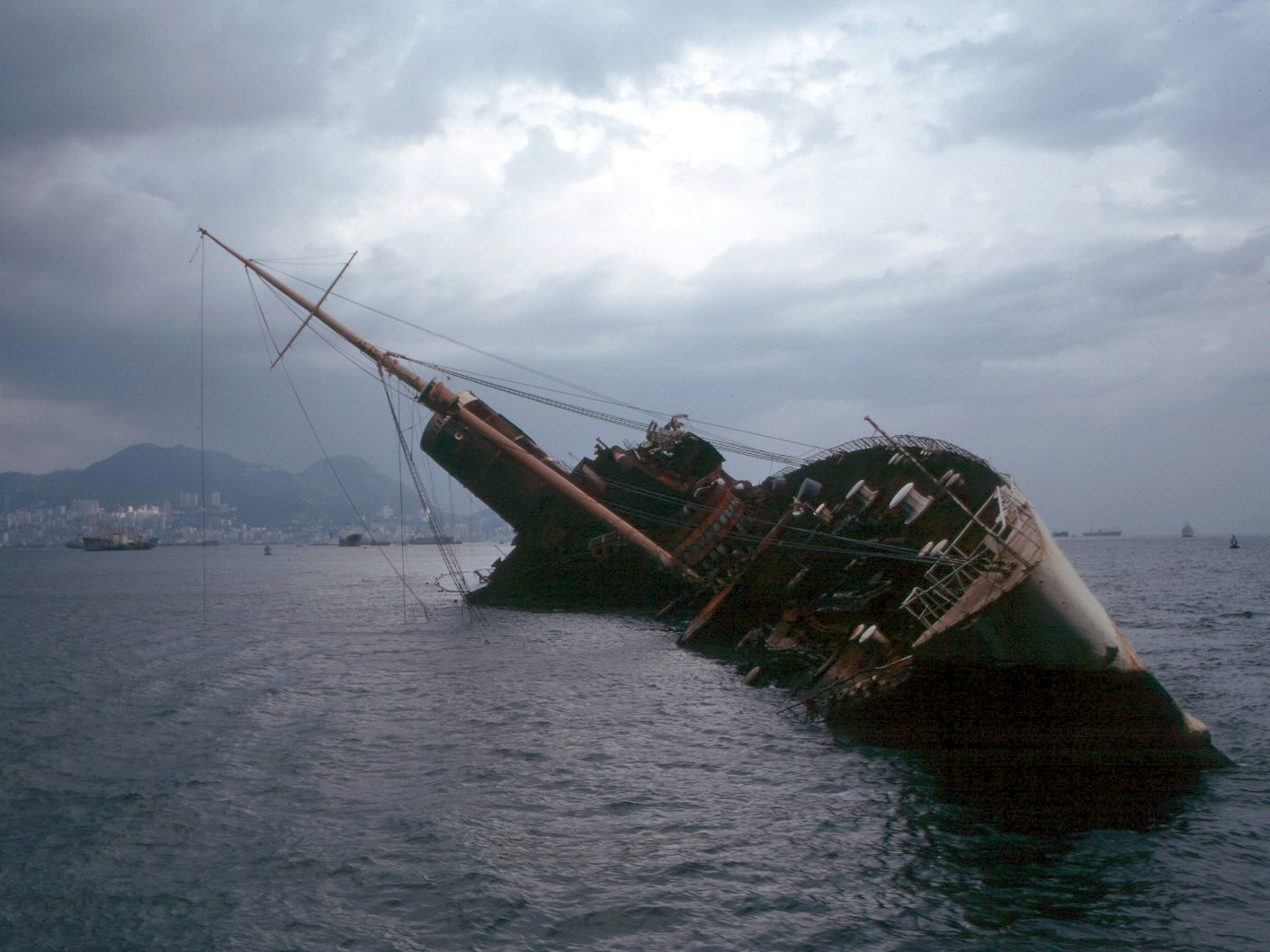
1972: The wreck of Seawise University, ex-Queen Elizabeth, in Victoria Harbour, Hong Kong

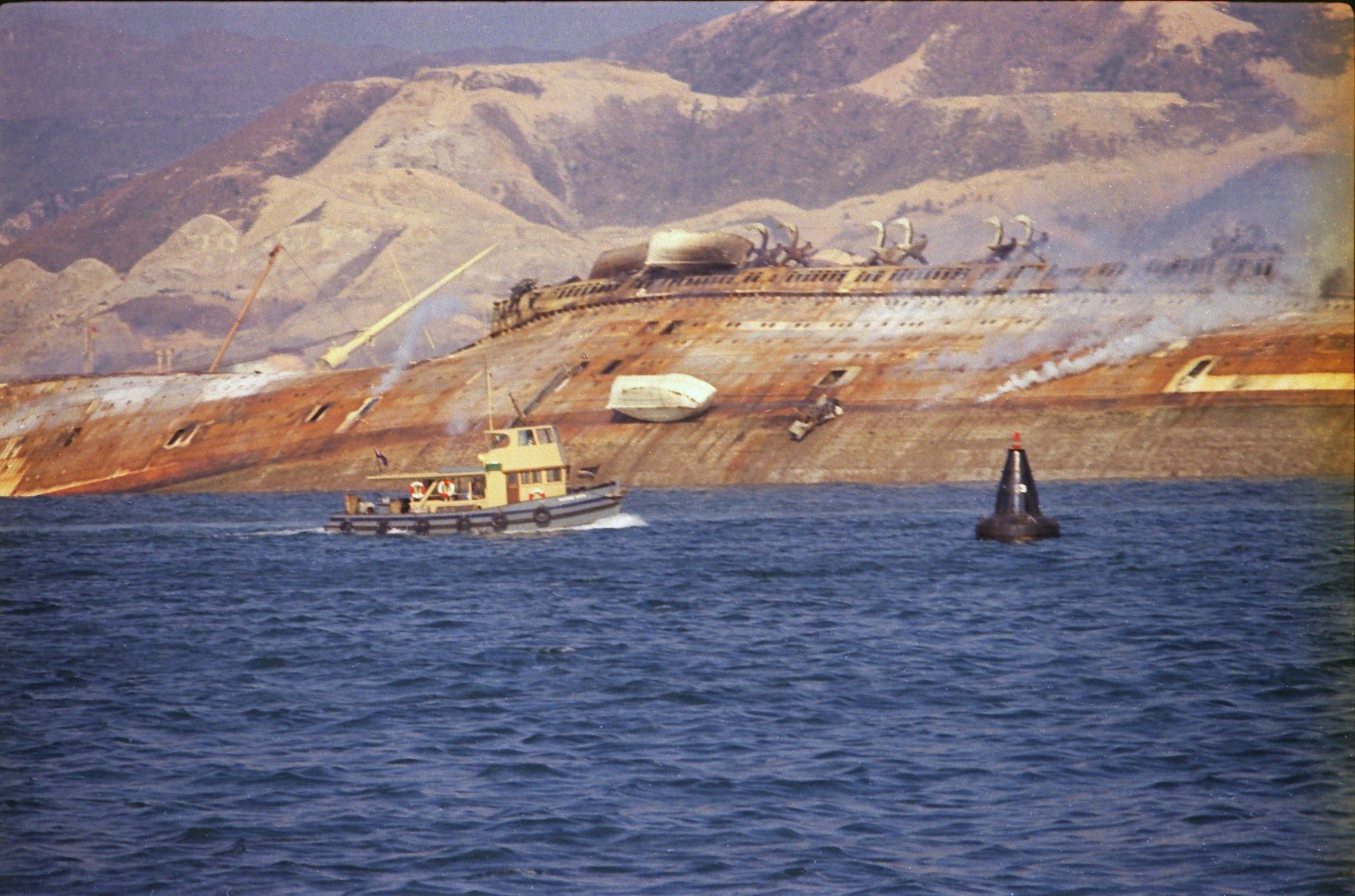
The wreck of Seawise University after the fire

== In fiction ==
In 1959, the ship made an appearance in the British satirical comedy film The Mouse That Roared, starring Peter Sellers and Jean Seberg. While a troupe of invading men from "Grand Fenwick", a fictional European micro-nation, cross the Atlantic to 'war' with the United States, they meet and pass the far larger Queen Elizabeth, and learn that the port of New York is closed due to an air raid drill.

Ian Fleming set the climax to his 1956 James Bond novel Diamonds Are Forever on Queen Elizabeth. The 1971 film version starring Connery used the P&O liner SS Canberra for the sequence.

The wreck was featured in the 1974 James Bond film The Man with the Golden Gun, as a covert headquarters for MI6.
