= Yang Yuyu =

Taiwanese sculptor

Yang Yuyu was born Yang Ying-feng (Chinese: 楊英風, January 17, 1926 – October 21, 1997) in Yilan, also known by his nickname Yu-yu (呦呦), was a Taiwanese sculptor. He was renowned for his late-period modernist abstract composite forms, stainless steel material, and Chinese aesthetics.

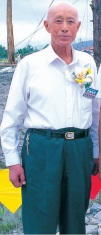
Yang Yuyu

== Life ==
Yang Yuyu was born into a prominent family in Yilan, Taiwan. As the eldest son, he was affectionately known as "Yu-yu". His parents were engaged in business in Beiping (now Beijing) for an extended period. After graduating from elementary school in 1940, he went to Beiping to study and often spent his spare time sketching. He received instruction from Kuo Po-chuan, Asai Takeshi (淺井 武), and Samukawa Norimi (寒川 典美).

In 1944, Yang went to the Architecture Department at Tokyo University of the Arts (formerly Tokyo Fine Arts School), where he studied sculpture under Fumio Asakura and Isoya Yoshida. During this period, he developed an interest in environmental art, particularly in landscape design. Later, he applied for a leave of absence due to physical discomfort. He returned to Beiping in 1946 and enrolled in the Department of Fine Arts at Fu Jen Catholic University. The following year, he married his cousin Li Ding (李定) and taught art at the Lanyang Girls' High School (蘭陽女中) before becoming a botanical illustrator for the National Taiwan University in Taipei. In 1948, he enrolled in the Art Department at National Taiwan Normal University, marking his third university education. He was a student of Chang Dai-chien and Pu Xinyu.

=== Creative journey ===
In 1951, Yang Yuyu dropped out of the Department of Fine Arts at National Taiwan Normal University and began working as an art editor for "Feng Nian Magazine (豐年雜誌)". Over his 11-year career as an editor, he created numerous local woodblock prints and cartoons. In 1953, his sculpture "Sudden Rain (驟雨)" won the "Taiyang Award (台陽賞)" at the 16th Taiyang Art Exhibition (台陽美術展覽會). In 1956, his Buddhist sculpture "Elevated Beyond Measure (仰之彌高)" was exhibited at the international exhibition "São Paulo Art Biennial". In 1960, he held his first solo exhibition at National Museum of History.

In 1961, Yang resigned as art editor and began to focus on sculpture. In 1962, he and Xiu Zelan designed the Taichung Teachers' Association Building (臺中教師會館, now the Internship Hotel of The Affiliated Taichung Senior Agricultural Vocational High School of National Chung Hsing University, 中興大學附屬台中高農的附設實習旅館). During this time, he was also quite active in the Fifth Moon Group, leading young painters onto the international stage. He received a silver award at the Hong Kong International Painting Salon Exhibition that year. The following year (1963), he began to work with stainless steel and spent three years living in Italy, organizing many exhibitions that introduced Chinese modern art to Europe. Upon his return to Taiwan in 1966, Yang began creating his stone landscape sculpture series in Hualien and received the "Golden Medal Award (金爵獎)" from the Art Society of Republic of China (中華民國畫協會). In the 1970s, designed many modern sculptures for hotels, theme parks, and large buildings.

=== Mature years ===
On March 14, 1970, Yang Yuyu created "Advent of the Phoenix (鳳凰來儀)", a work measuring 7 meters high and 9 meters wide, which was exhibited at the Chinese (Republic of China) Pavilion designed by I.M. Pei at the World Expo in Osaka, Japan. A smaller replica of the artwork was placed in front of the Taipei Fubon Bank building on Zhongshan North Road, Section 2 in Taipei.

In 1973, Yang created "QE Gate", also known as "East-West Gate", which was placed on Wall Street in Manhattan, New York City, showcasing a philosophical aesthetic inspired by the Eastern concept of emptiness.

In 1975, Yang used bamboo and rattan to create sculptures and props for the Cloud Gate Dance Theatre's production of Legend of the White Snake. However, the sculpture backdrop "Snake Nest" and the original bamboo curtain were destroyed in a fire at the Cloud Gate rehearsal studio in Bali in 2008. In 2010, the Cloud Gate Dance Theatre recreated the "Snake Nest" and bamboo curtain based on the original designs.

During the 1980s, Yang actively promoted academic research in Taiwan's architectural and landscape design fields, while creating many designs and sculptures for commercial buildings and landscapes. He also designed trophies for many awards, including the trophy for the "National Quality Award (國家品質獎)" in 1989. That same year, his work "Little Flying Phoenix (小鳳翔)" was acquired by the Taipei Fine Arts Museum.

In the 1990s, Yang received the Second World Peace Culture and Art Award and participated in various international exhibitions, including his solo exhibition at National Museum of Singapore in 1991, the "Miami Art Expo" and the 2nd "International Contemporary Art Fair (NICAF)" in Yokohama, Japan in 1993, and the "International Contemporary Art Fair (FIAC)" in Paris, France. On October 21, 1997, after completing a solo exhibition at the Hakone Open-Air Museum in Japan, Yang died at the age of 72 in Fayuan Temple (法源寺) in Hsinchu due to sepsis caused by pulmonary edema and renal failure.

== Major works ==
National Chiao Tung University (NCTU) campus is home to 13 works by Yang Yuyu. Additionally, the library within NCTU houses "Advent of the Phoenix", bringing the total number of his works on campus to 14. However, only "Enlightenment" is an original work, with the others being replicas.

In the year 2000, the Yuyu Yang Art Education Foundation and NCTU jointly established the "Yuyu Yang Art Research Center," which led to the gradual appearance of other works by the artist in the university's Guangfu campus (光復校區). While these are marked as original, it is said that they are in fact reproductions.

There are 13 works by Yang Yuyu at Fu Jen Catholic University (FJCU). Most of these work were donated to the university's collection after the conclusion of exhibitions held by the Vatican. Among them, "Justice (正氣)", "Bright Moon (明月)", and "Global Village (地球村)" are original works, and were donated to FJCU in accordance with Yang Yuyu 's wishes in 2003.

Yang Yuyu 's sculptural works can also be found on the campuses of National Taiwan University of Science and Technology and Asia University in Taiwan.

== Books ==
The "Yang Yuyu Complete Collection (楊英風全集)" is a 30-volume set edited by the Yang Yuyu Art Research Center of National Chiao Tung University and the Yang Yuyu Art Education Foundation. The collection was published by the Artist Publishing House (藝術家出版社) and was released on October 27, 2011.
