= James Ingo Freed =

American architect

James I. Freed
- Born: James Ingo Freed; June 23, 1930; Essen, Germany
- Died: December 15, 2005 (aged 75); New York City, US
- Education: Illinois Institute of Technology
- Occupation: Architect
- Spouse: Hermine Freed
- Buildings: Jacob K. Javits Convention Center, San Francisco Main Public Library, United States Air Force Memorial, Capella Tower
- Projects: Ronald Reagan Building and International Trade Center, United States Holocaust Memorial Museum

James Ingo Freed (June 23, 1930 – December 15, 2005) was an American architect born in Essen, Germany. After coming to the United States at age nine with his sister Betty, followed later by their parents, he studied at the Illinois Institute of Technology, where he graduated with a degree in architecture.

In the late 1970s, he was a member of the Chicago Seven and dean for three years of the School of Architecture at his alma mater. He worked for most of his career based in New York, and went beyond the Internationalist and modernist styles. In partnership with I.M. Pei, in their firm known as Pei Cobb Freed & Partners, he worked on major United States public buildings and museums.

== Early life and education ==
James Ingo Freed was born in 1930 in Essen, Germany to a German-Jewish family. The family left Germany in 1939, when Freed was nine years old, to escape the regime of Nazi Germany. They immigrated to the United States and settled in Chicago. He graduated from Hyde Park High School.

In 1953, Freed received a bachelor's degree in architecture from the Illinois Institute of Technology.

== Career ==
Freed first worked in Chicago and New York City, including with Ludwig Mies van der Rohe, a prominent modernist architect.

In 1956, he began working with I.M. Pei in New York at the firm eventually known as Pei Cobb Freed & Partners.

In the late 1970s, Freed was a member of the Chicago Seven, a group which emerged in opposition to the doctrinal application of modernism, as represented particularly in Chicago by the followers of Mies van der Rohe.

From 1975 to 1978, Freed was dean of the School of Architecture at the Illinois Institute of Technology, whose campus had been designed by van der Rohe. He also taught at Cooper Union, Cornell University, the Rhode Island School of Design, Columbia University, and Yale University.

Freed's major works include the Jacob K. Javits Convention Center in New York City, the San Francisco Main Public Library, and the United States Air Force Memorial in Arlington, Virginia next to the Pentagon, which was still under construction at the time of his death. His bright white-and-glass design of 88 Pine Street (Wall Street Plaza) won an award. He designed several major buildings in Washington, D.C.: the Ronald Reagan Building and International Trade Center and the United States Holocaust Memorial Museum. He worked with I.M. Pei on the design of the Kips Bay Plaza project in New York City. In 1988, he was elected into the National Academy of Design as an Associate member, and became a full Academician in 1994.

In 1995, Freed was awarded the National Medal of Arts.

He died on December 15, 2005, of Parkinson's disease, at age 75 in his home in Manhattan, in New York City.

== Gallery ==
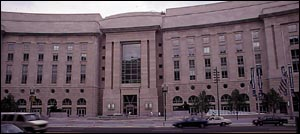
Ronald Reagan Building, Washington, D.C.

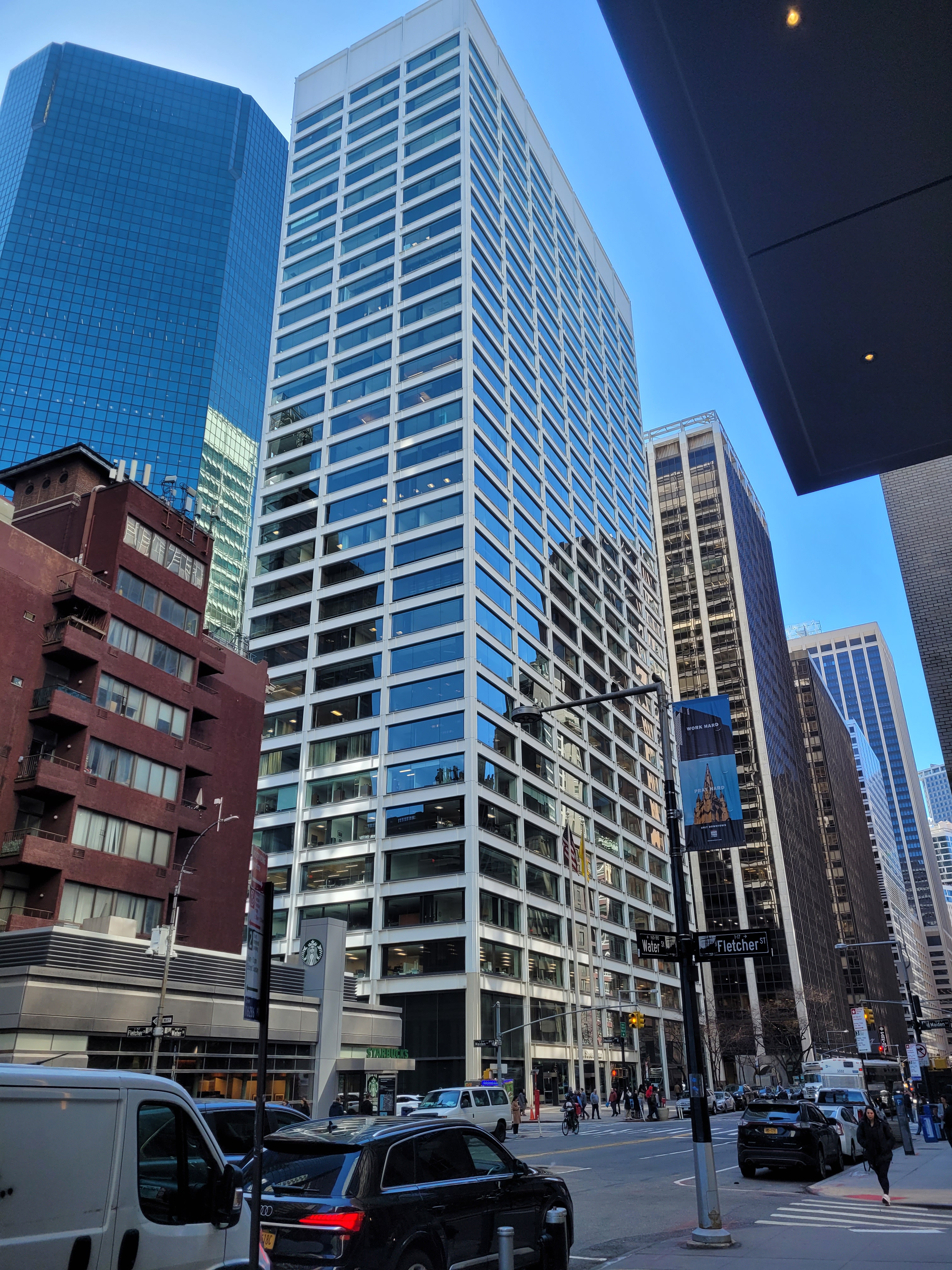
Wall Street Plaza (88 Pine Street), New York, NY

== See also ==
- Chicago Seven (architects)
