= Tung Chee-chen =

Hong Kong businessman

- Born: December 15, 1942 (age 83)
- Education: University of Liverpool; Massachusetts Institute of Technology
- Spouse: married
- Children: 2

Tung Chee-chen
- Chinese: 董建成
Transcriptions
Standard Mandarin
- Hanyu Pinyin: Dǒng Jiànchéng
Yue: Cantonese
- Jyutping: dung2 gin3 sing4

Tung Chee-chen, GBS, SBS, JP (Chinese: 董建成; born 15 December 1942) is a Hong Kong billionaire businessman. He is the chairman and chief executive of shipping company Orient Overseas and a member of the One Country Two Systems Research Institute, a pro-Beijing political thinktank. He is Monaco's honorary consul to Hong Kong.

== Early life ==
Tung is the second son of shipping tycoon Tung Chao-yung, and the younger brother of Tung Chee-hwa, the first chief executive of the Hong Kong Special Administrative Region. Their ancestral hometown is Ningbo in China's Zhejiang Province.

He earned a bachelor's degree from the University of Liverpool and master's in mechanical engineering from MIT.

== Career ==
Tung served as chairman of the Hong Kong Shipowners' Association from 1993 until 1995. He was the Hong Kong General Chamber of Commerce chairman from 1999 to 2001. In 1996, Tung was appointed chairman and CEO of Orient Overseas (International) Limited, one of the largest shipping companies in the world.

He has acted as an independent non-executive director of the following companies:

- PetroChina Co. Ltd., a Chinese State-owned Enterprise (SOE)
- Zhejiang Expressway Company Ltd., a Chinese SOE
- BOC Hong Kong (Holdings) Ltd., a Chinese SOE
- Wing Hang Bank Ltd.
- Sing Tao News Corporation (2002–2013)
- Cathay Pacific Airways Ltd.
- U-Ming Marine Transport Corporation, a unit of the Far Eastern Group

=== Affiliations ===
Tung is the chairman of the Institute for Shipboard Education Foundation (which oversees the Semester at Sea program), a member of the board of trustees of the Hong Kong Polytechnic University, and a member of the board of trustees of the International Academic Center of the University of Pittsburgh and the Georgetown University's School of Foreign Service. He was appointed member of the Asia-Pacific Economic Cooperation (APEC) Business Advisory Council (ABAC) by the Hong Kong government in 2002.

== Wealth ==
In April 2009, Tung was ranked as the 23rd wealthiest man in Hong Kong, worth US$900 million. In January 2008, Tung and his family were ranked (also by Forbes) as the 16th wealthiest in Hong Kong, with a total value of US$3 billion.

== Honours ==
Tung was awarded the Gold Bauhinia Star by the Hong Kong Government in 2016 and an honorary doctorate degree by the University of Liverpool in 2009.
