= Tung Chao-yung =

Chinese businessman (1912–1982)

- 董兆榮 or 董浩雲
- Born: 1912; Dinghai, Zhoushan, Zhejiang, China
- Died: 15 April 1982 (aged 69); Hong Kong
- Occupation: Founder of Orient Overseas Container Line
- Children: Tung Chee-hwa; Tung Chee-chen; Tung Chee-ping; Tung Siu-ping; Tung Yi-ping

Tung Chao-yung or C. Y. Tung (traditional Chinese: 董兆榮; simplified Chinese: 董兆荣; pinyin: Dǒng Zhàoróng; 28 September 1912 – 15 April 1982), also known as Tung Hao-yun (simplified Chinese: 董浩云; traditional Chinese: 董浩雲; pinyin: Dǒng Hàoyún), was a Chinese shipping magnate and the founder of the Orient Overseas Line (now Orient Overseas Container Line or OOCL). He was the father of Tung Chee-hwa, the first chief executive of Hong Kong.

At the peak of his career, he owned a shipping fleet with over 150 freight ships; his fleet's cargo capacity exceeded 10 million tons.

== Career ==
Tung was born in Dinghai, Zhejiang, on Zhoushan Island. He spent his early business years in Tianjin and Shanghai.

In 1945, Tung bought an old boat, The Heavenly Dragon, which would become his company's flagship and the first Chinese boat to drop anchor at European ports. He moved to Taiwan with the Kuomintang in 1949, and diversified his investments in Hong Kong with the companies Maritime Transport Limited, the Oriental Overseas Container Line (OOCL), Island Navigation Corporation.

Tung accumulated his fleet of ships over the next few years. In 1959, he built the largest tanker in the world, the 70,000 tonne Oriental Giant, followed by his first new boat in France. In 1971, he purchased the Queen Elizabeth, which he wanted to make into a floating university, an endeavour to later inspire the Semester at Sea programme.

Tung believed in the importance of education. In September 1970, he bought the former Cunard ocean liner RMS Queen Elizabeth to convert it into a floating university S.S. Seawise University to keep the World Campus Afloat programme alive. His goal was to help the United Nations train maritime specialists. On 9 January 1972, the ship caught fire during refurbishing and sank into Victoria Harbor in Hong Kong on the eve of her inaugural voyage. Tung did not give up on the plan because of this setback, and bought a smaller ocean liner, SS Atlantic, to complete the plan. He cooperated with various universities (e.g. University of Pittsburgh) to run the academic sea programme with the Institute of Shipboard Education entitled Semester at Sea. In 1979, Tung received the Golden Plate Award of the American Academy of Achievement.

Politically, Tung was aligned with Kuomintang regime of the Republic of China (ROC) on Taiwan. The company emblem of the OOCL is a plum blossom, the national flower of the ROC, and Tung Group was considered the national merchant shipping company of the ROC. However, when the OOCL experienced financial trouble after his death, the government of the People's Republic of China rescued the company. This paved the way for Tung's son, Tung Chee-hwa, to become the chief executive of Hong Kong, which became a special administrative region of China following the city's 1997 handover from the UK.
