= Aleksandr Tatarinov =

Russian naval officer

Aleksandr Arkadevich Tatarinov
- Born: 25 October 1950 (age 75); Olovyanninsky District, Chita Oblast, Russian SFSR, USSR
- Allegiance: Soviet Union; Russia
- Branch: Soviet Navy; Russian Navy
- Service years: 1967–2016
- Rank: Admiral
- Commands: Obraztsovy; Black Sea Fleet
- Awards: Order of Military Merit; Order of Naval Merit; Order "For Service to the Homeland in the Armed Forces of the USSR" Third Class; Order of Saint Righteous Grand Duke Dmitry Donskoy Second Class

Aleksandr Arkadevich Tatarinov (Russian: Александр Аркадьевич Татаринов; born 25 October 1950) is a former officer of the Russian Navy. He holds the rank of admiral, and retired in 2016 after serving as First Deputy Commander-in-Chief of the Russian Navy.

Tatarinov's service began with the Soviet Navy, after studying at and graduating from the Nakhimov Black Sea Higher Naval School. He entered service with the Baltic Fleet, rising through the ranks to his own commands by 1980. He then went on to several staff appointments, at first with the Baltic Fleet, and then with the Black Sea Fleet, where he served as chief of staff and was promoted to vice-admiral. He was tipped to take command of the fleet in 2002, but was passed over in favour of Vladimir Masorin. When Masorin was appointed to a different post in 2005, Tatarinov took his post as commander of the Black Sea Fleet. His work required considerable diplomatic skill, as he held meetings and negotiations with NATO officials, and representatives of the Ukrainian forces over shared access to Black Sea naval facilities.

On 20 July 2007 Tatarinov was appointed Deputy Commander-in-Chief of the Russian Navy, and then chief of staff and First Deputy Commander-in-Chief in 2009, and served in this post for several years. Despite criticism over the navy's response to the 2010 Russian wildfires, Tatarinov played a key role in naval reforms, and trials of the RSM-56 Bulava ballistic missile. He was given special dispensation to continue in service beyond the usual mandatory retirement age of 60, and instead retired at 65. He had received several honours and awards over his period of service.

== Early career ==
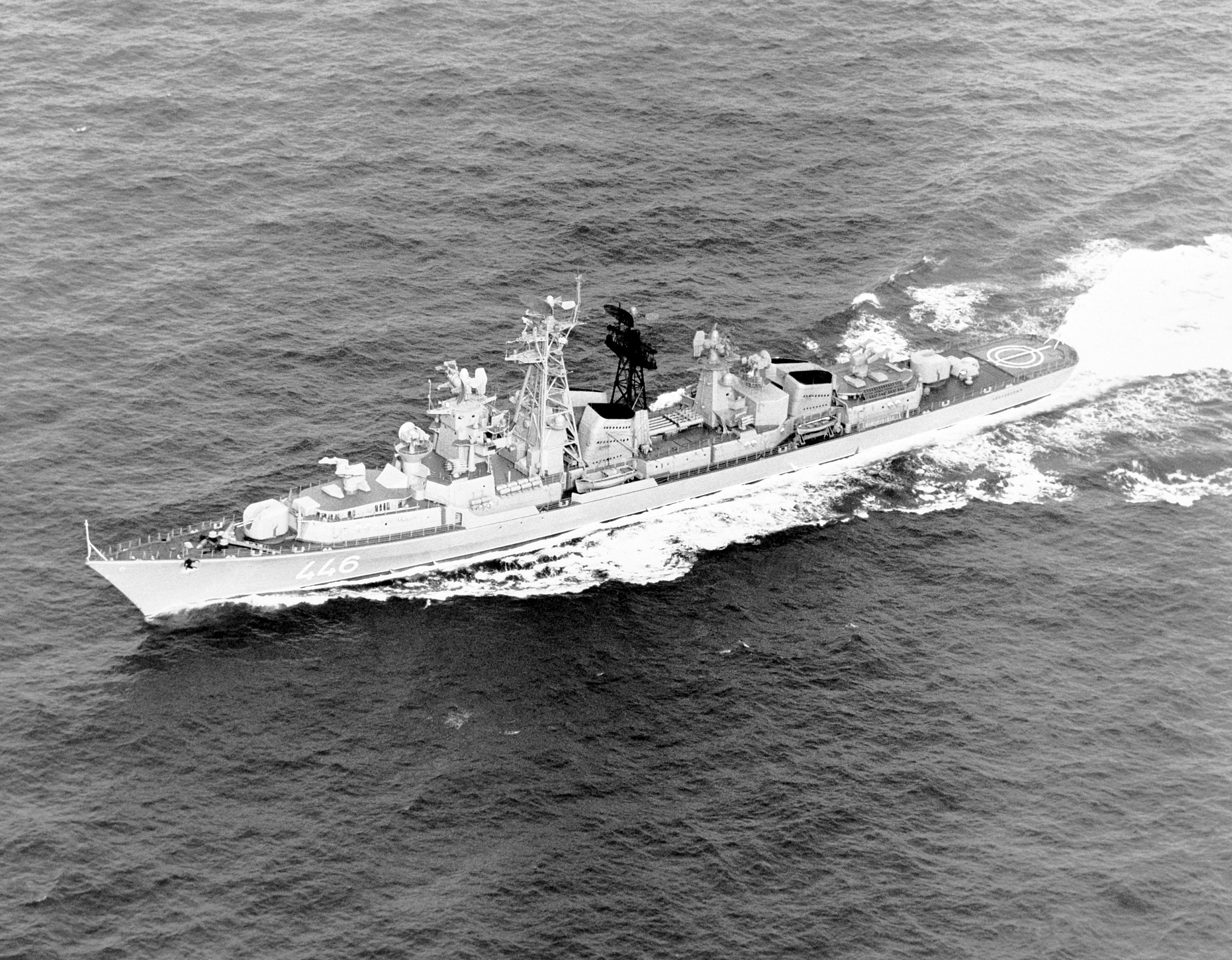
The Kashin-class destroyer Obraztsovy, Tatarinov's command from 1980.

Tatarinov was born on 25 October 1950 in Olovyanninsky District, Chita Oblast, then part of the Russian SFSR of the Soviet Union. He completed his high school studies in 1967, and went to study at the Nakhimov Black Sea Higher Naval School, graduating in 1972. He began his active service with the Baltic Fleet, acting as head of one of the rear base's mine-torpedo armaments laboratory between 1972 and 1973. In 1973 he was appointed commander of an anti-aircraft battery, and in 1976 took command of the artillery section of the Kashin-class destroyer Slavny. From 1977 to 1979 Tatarinov was the senior assistant to the commander of the Krivak-class frigate Bodryy, followed by a post as senior assistant to the commander of Bodryy's sister ship Neukrotimyy. He took the Higher Special Officer Classes of the Navy, graduating in 1980, and was appointed commander of the Kashin-class destroyer Obraztsovy.

Tatarinov graduated with honours from the Naval Academy in 1988 and was appointed chief of staff of an anti-submarine brigade of the Baltic Fleet, becoming the brigade's commander in 1990. In 1994 he became the chief of staff and first deputy commander of the Baltic Naval Base, and then in April 1996, he was appointed the base's commander of the Baltic Naval Base. On 22 September 1997 Tatarinov was appointed chief of staff of the Black Sea Fleet, and was promoted to vice-admiral on 23 February 1999. Tatarinov undertook further study at the Military Academy of the General Staff of the Armed Forces of Russia, graduating in 2002. Following the resignation of the fleet's commander, Admiral Vladimir Komoyedov, in October that year, there was media speculation that Tatarinov would be appointed to succeed him. Instead Vice-Admiral Vladimir Masorin, the commander of the Caspian Flotilla, was appointed as the fleet's commander, supposedly on the pretext of Tatarinov's "excessive exactingness and rigidity as leader".

== Black Sea command and staff posts ==
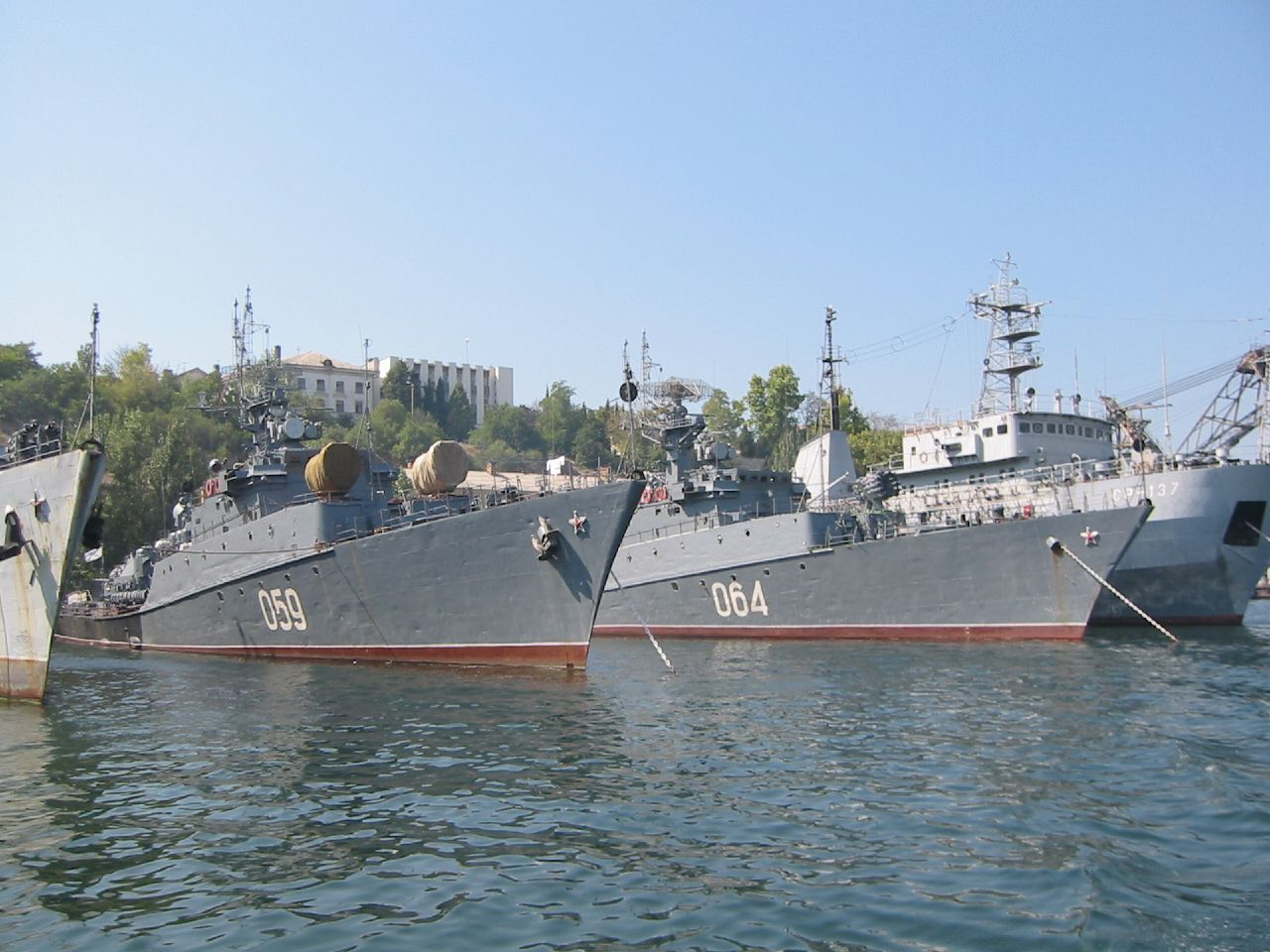
Ships of the Black Sea Fleet in 2005, during Tatarinov's tenure as fleet commander

On 15 February 2005 Masorin was appointed Chief of the Main Naval Staff, with Tatarinov assigned to fill his position as commander of the Black Sea Fleet. In his new role Tatarinov worked with NATO representatives in July 2005 to determine the role of Russian warships in Operation Active Endeavour, an anti-terrorist operation in the Mediterranean. On 12 December 2005 Tatarinov was promoted to admiral. In January 2006 Tatarinov led a deputation of officers from the fleet's base in Sevastopol to Yalta to negotiate with Ukrainian officials over the status of a disputed lighthouse. On 20 July 2007 he was appointed deputy Commander-in-Chief of the Russian Navy, and on 7 July 2009 was advanced to Chief of staff and First Deputy Commander of the Navy. After naval installations were damaged during the 2010 Russian wildfires, Russian President Dmitry Medvedev sacked several senior naval officials, and warned both Tatarinov and Navy Commander-in-Chief Vladimir Vysotskiy over their "incomplete professional responsibility".

In October 2011 he met with NATO Supreme Allied Commander Europe Admiral James G. Stavridis to discuss joint anti-piracy measures, and cooperation with Operation Active Endeavour. In October 2010 Dmitry Medvedev took the step of extending Tatarinov's time in service by another year. On 30 January 2012 it was extended by another four years, meaning Tatarinov would retire at the age of 65, rather than the usual mandatory retirement age of 60. This was part of several extensions granted to important figures connected to Russian military reform. Tatarinov was noted as playing a key role in the trials of the RSM-56 Bulava ballistic missile.

== Awards and honours ==
Over his career Tatarinov has been awarded the Order of Military Merit, the Order of Naval Merit and the Order "For Service to the Homeland in the Armed Forces of the USSR" Third Class. On 10 November 2005 he was awarded the Order of Saint Righteous Grand Duke Dmitry Donskoy Second Class by Patriarch Alexy II of Moscow, for his "hard work on the revival and establishment of the original spiritual traditions of the Russian military in the Russian Navy".

Tatarinov is married, with two children, a daughter and son.

Military offices
Preceded by Mikhail Abramov	Chief of the Main Staff and First Deputy Commander-in-Chief of the Russian Navy; 2009–2016	Succeeded by Andrei Volozhinsky
