= Commander-in-Chief of the Russian Navy =

Commanding officer of the Russian Navy

- Главнокомандующий ВМФ
- Flag of the Commander-in-Chief of the Russian Navy

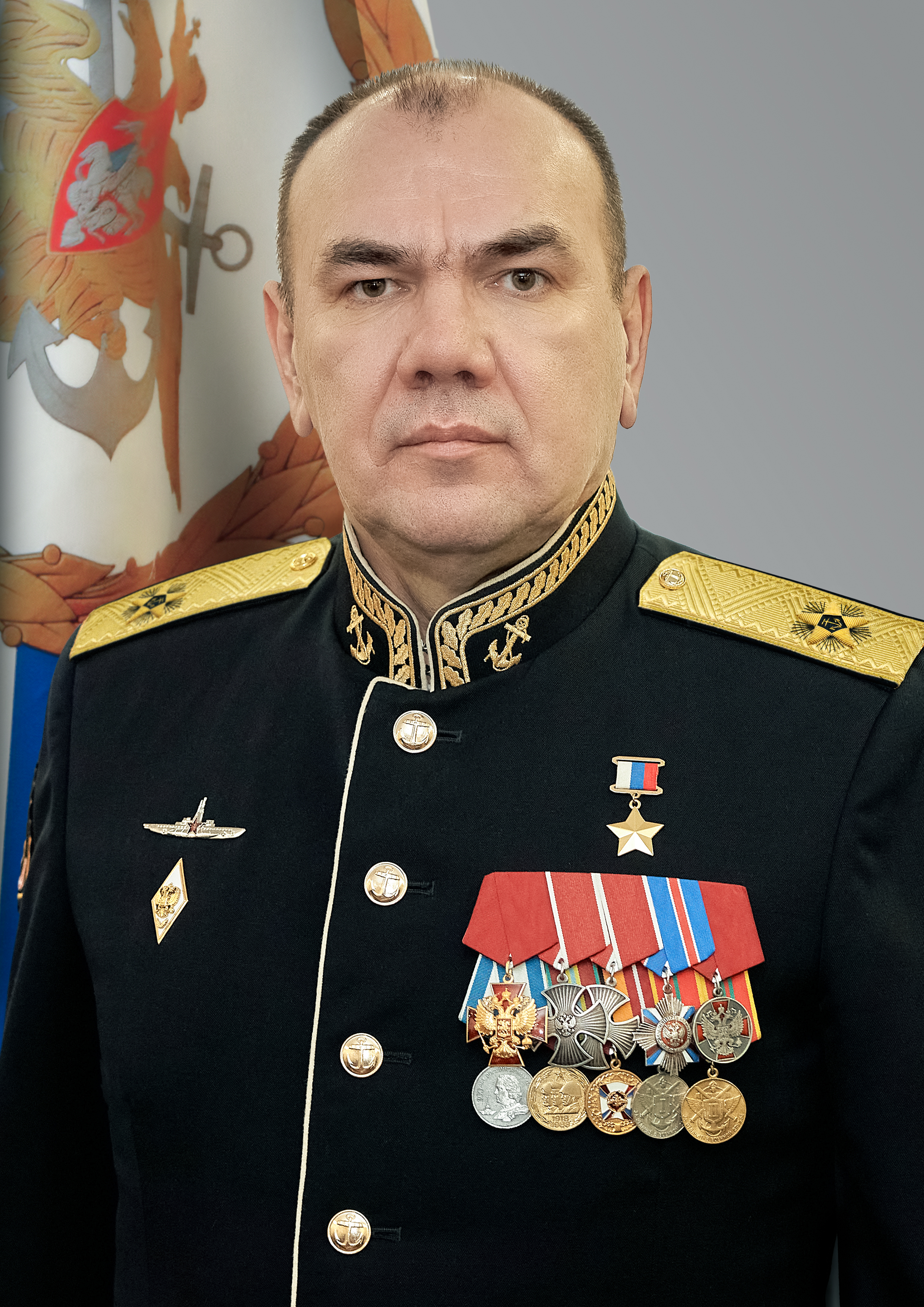
- Incumbent; Fleet admiral Aleksandr Moiseyev since 2 April 2024
- Russian Navy
- Member of: General Staff of the Armed Forces
- Reports to: Chief of the General Staff
- Appointer: President of Russia
- Formation: 8 September 1802 (historical); 19 August 1992 (current form)
- Website: Official website

The Commander-in-Chief of the Russian Navy (Russian: Главнокомандующий ВМФ) is the chief commanding authority of the Russian Navy. He is appointed by the President of Russia. The position dates to the period of the Russian Empire. The current Commander-in-Chief of the Russian Navy is Fleet admiral Aleksandr Moiseyev.

== List of Commanders ==
=== Ministers of Sea Forces (1802–1815) ===
| No. | Portrait | Minister | Took office | Left office | Time in office |
|---|---|---|---|---|---|
| 1 | Nikolay Mordvinov | Count; Nikolay Mordvinov (1754–1845) | 8 September 1802 | 28 December 1802 | 111 days |
| 2 | Pavel Chichagov | Pavel Chichagov (1767–1849) | 31 December 1802 | 28 November 1811 | 8 years, 332 days |
| 3 | Ivan de Traverse | Ivan de Traverse (1754–1831) | 28 November 1811 | 17 December 1815 | 4 years, 19 days |

=== Ministers of the Navy (1815–1917) ===
On 17 December 1815 the Ministry of Sea Forces was renamed, becoming the Ministry of the Navy.

| No. | Portrait | Minister of the Navy | Took office | Left office | Time in office |
|---|---|---|---|---|---|
| 1 | Ivan de Traverse | Ivan de Traverse (1754–1831) | 17 December 1815 | 24 March 1828 | 12 years, 98 days |
| 2 | Anton Otto von Möller [ru] | Admiral; Anton Otto von Möller (1764–1848) | 24 March 1828 | 5 February 1836 | 7 years, 318 days |
| 3 | Prince Alexander Menshikov | Admiral; Prince Alexander Menshikov (1787–1869) | 5 February 1836 | 23 February 1855 | 19 years, 18 days |
| 4 | Baron Ferdinand von Wrangel | Admiral; Baron Ferdinand von Wrangel (1797–1870) | 18 May 1855 | 27 July 1857 | 2 years, 70 days |
| 5 | Nikolay Metlin [ru] | Admiral; Nikolay Metlin (1804–1884) | 27 July 1857 | 18 September 1860 | 3 years, 53 days |
| 6 | Nikolai Krabbe | Admiral; Nikolai Krabbe (1814–1876) | 19 September 1860 | 3 January 1876 † | 15 years, 106 days |
| 7 | Stepan Lesovskiy [ru] | Admiral; Stepan Lesovskiy (1817–1884) | 12 January 1876 | 23 June 1880 | 4 years, 163 days |
| 8 | Aleksey Peshchurov [ru] | Vice admiral Aleksey Peshchurov (1834–1891) | 23 June 1880 | 11 January 1882 | 1 year, 202 days |
| 9 | Ivan Shestakov | Admiral; Ivan Shestakov (1820–1888) | 11 January 1882 | 21 November 1888 | 6 years, 315 days |
| 10 | Nikolai Chikhachyov [ru] | Admiral; Nikolai Chikhachyov (1830–1917) | 28 November 1888 | 13 July 1896 | 7 years, 228 days |
| 11 | Pavel Tyrtov [ru] | Admiral; Pavel Tyrtov (1836–1903) | 13 July 1896 | 4 March 1903 † | 6 years, 234 days |
| 12 | Theodor Avellan | Admiral; Theodor Avellan (1839–1916) | 10 March 1903 | 29 June 1905 | 2 years, 117 days |
| 13 | Aleksei Birilev | Admiral; Aleksei Birilev (1844–1915) | 29 June 1905 | 11 January 1907 | 1 year, 196 days |
| 14 | Ivan Dikov | Admiral; Ivan Dikov (1833–1914) | 11 January 1907 | 8 January 1909 | 1 year, 363 days |
| 15 | Stepan Voevodskiy [ru] | Admiral; Stepan Voevodskiy (1859–1937) | 8 January 1909 | 18 March 1911 | 2 years, 69 days |
| 16 | Ivan Grigorovich | Admiral; Ivan Grigorovich (1853–1930) | 19 March 1911 | 28 February 1917 | 5 years, 346 days |
| 17 | Alexander Guchkov | Alexander Guchkov (1862–1936) | 1 March 1917 | 30 April 1917 | 60 days |

=== Commanders of Naval Forces of the RSFSR (1918–1921) ===
| No. | Portrait | Commander | Took office | Left office | Time in office |
|---|---|---|---|---|---|
| 1 | Vasily Altfater | Vasily Altfater (1883–1919) (Note: Military ranks were abolished in 1918–1935.) | 15 October 1918 | 22 April 1919 | 189 days |
| 2 | Yevgeny Berens | Yevgeny Berens (1876–1928) | 24 April 1919 | 5 February 1920 | 287 days |
| 3 | Aleksandr Nemits | Aleksandr Nemits (1879–1967) | 5 February 1920 | 22 November 1921 | 1 year, 290 days |

=== Commanders of the White Movement Fleet (1917–1924) ===
| No. | Portrait | Commander | Took office | Left office | Time in office |
|---|---|---|---|---|---|
| 1 | Pyotr Wrangel | Pyotr Wrangel (1878–1928) | ? | ? | ? |
| 2 | Mikhail Kedrov | Rear Admiral; Mikhail Kedrov (1878–1945) | ? | November 1920 | ? |
| 3 | Mikhail Berens | Rear Admiral; Mikhail Berens (1879–1943) | November 1920 | 29 October 1924 | 3 years, 11 months |

=== Commander-in-Chief's Assistant for Naval Affairs (1921–1924) ===
| No. | Portrait | Commander-in-Chief | Took office | Left office | Time in office |
|---|---|---|---|---|---|
| 1 | Eduard Pantserzhanskiy | Eduard Pantserzhanskiy (1887–1937) | 22 November 1921 | 9 December 1924 | 3 years, 17 days |

=== Commanders-in-Chief of the Naval Forces of the USSR (1924–1937) ===
| No. | Portrait | Commander-in-Chief | Took office | Left office | Time in office |
|---|---|---|---|---|---|
| 1 | Vyacheslav Zof | Vyacheslav Zof (1889–1937) | 9 December 1924 | 23 August 1926 | 1 year, 257 days |
| 2 | Romuald Muklevich | Romuald Muklevich (1890–1938) | 23 August 1926 | 11 June 1931 | 4 years, 292 days |
| 3 | Vladimir Mitrofanovich Orlov | Fleet Flag-officer 1st Rank; Vladimir Mitrofanovich Orlov (1895–1938) | 11 June 1931 | 15 August 1937 | 6 years, 65 days |
| - | Lev Galler | Fleet Flag-officer 2nd Rank; Lev Galler (1883–1950); Acting | 10 July 1937 | 15 August 1937 | 36 days |
| 4 | Mikhail Viktorov | Fleet Flag-officer 1st Rank; Mikhail Viktorov (1893–1938) | 15 August 1937 | 30 December 1937 | 137 days |

=== People's Commissars for the USSR Navy (1937–1939) ===
| No. | Portrait | People's Commissar | Took office | Left office | Time in office |
|---|---|---|---|---|---|
| 1 | Pyotr Smirnov | Army Commissar 1st Rank; Pyotr Smirnov (1897–1939) | 30 December 1937 | 30 June 1938 | 182 days |
| - | Pyotr Smirnov-Svetlovski [ru] | Fleet Flag-officer 2nd Rank; Pyotr Smirnov-Svetlovski (1887–1940); Acting | 30 June 1938 | 8 September 1938 | 70 days |
| 2 | Mikhail Frinovsky | Army Commander 1st Rank; Mikhail Frinovsky (1898–1940) | 8 September 1938 | 6 April 1939 | 210 days |
| 3 | Nikolai Kuznetsov | Fleet Flag-officer 2nd Rank; Nikolai Kuznetsov (1904–1974) | 28 April 1939 | 25 February 1946 | 6 years, 304 days |

=== Commanders-in-Chief of the Soviet Navy (1945–1950) ===
| No. | Portrait | Commander-in-Chief | Took office | Left office | Time in office |
|---|---|---|---|---|---|
| 1 | Nikolai Kuznetsov | Admiral of the Fleet; Nikolai Kuznetsov (1904–1974) | 25 February 1946 | 17 January 1947 | 326 days |
| 2 | Ivan Yumashev | Admiral; Ivan Yumashev (1895–1972) | 17 January 1947 | 25 February 1950 | 3 years, 39 days |

=== Ministers of the Navy (1951–1953) ===
| No. | Portrait | Ministers of the Navy | Took office | Left office | Time in office |
|---|---|---|---|---|---|
| 1 | Ivan Yumashev | Admiral; Ivan Yumashev (1895–1972) | 25 February 1950 | 20 July 1951 | 1 year, 145 days |
| 2 | Nikolai Kuznetsov | Admiral of the Fleet; Nikolai Kuznetsov (1904–1974) | 20 July 1951 | 15 March 1953 | 1 year, 268 days |

=== Commanders-in-Chief of the Soviet Navy (1953–1991) ===
| No. | Portrait | Commander-in-Chief | Took office | Left office | Time in office |
|---|---|---|---|---|---|
| 1 | Nikolai Kuznetsov | Fleet Admiral of the Soviet Union; Nikolai Kuznetsov (1904–1974) | 15 March 1953 | 5 January 1956 | 2 years, 296 days |
| 2 | Sergey Gorshkov | Fleet Admiral of the Soviet Union; Sergey Gorshkov (1910–1988) | 5 January 1956 | 8 December 1985 | 29 years, 337 days |
| 3 | Vladimir Chernavin | Fleet admiral Vladimir Chernavin (1928–2023) | 8 December 1985 | 25 December 1991 | 6 years, 18 days |

=== Commander-in-Chief of the Commonwealth of Independent States Navy (1991–1992) ===
| No. | Portrait | Commander-in-Chief | Took office | Left office | Time in office |
|---|---|---|---|---|---|
| 1 | Vladimir Chernavin | Fleet admiral Vladimir Chernavin (1928–2023) | 25 December 1991 | 19 August 1992 | 237 days |

=== Commanders-in-Chief of the Russian Navy (1992–present) ===
| No. | Portrait | Commander-in-Chief | Took office | Left office | Time in office |
|---|---|---|---|---|---|
| 1 | Feliks Gromov | Fleet admiral Feliks Gromov (1937–2021) | 19 August 1992 | 7 November 1997 | 5 years, 80 days |
| 2 | Vladimir Kuroyedov | Fleet admiral Vladimir Kuroyedov (1944–2026) | 7 November 1997 | 4 September 2005 | 7 years, 301 days |
| 3 | Vladimir Masorin | Fleet admiral Vladimir Masorin (born 1947) | 4 September 2005 | 27 August 2007 | 1 year, 357 days |
| 4 | Vladimir Vysotsky | Admiral; Vladimir Vysotsky (1954–2021) | 27 August 2007 | 6 May 2012 | 4 years, 253 days |
| 5 | Viktor Chirkov | Admiral; Viktor Chirkov (born 1959) | 6 May 2012 | 26 February 2016 | 3 years, 296 days |
| 6 | Vladimir Korolyov | Admiral; Vladimir Korolyov (born 1955) | 18 April 2016 | 3 May 2019 | 3 years, 46 days |
| 7 | Nikolai Yevmenov | Admiral; Nikolai Yevmenov (born 1962) | 3 May 2019 | 10 March 2024 | 4 years, 312 days |
| – | | Fleet admiral Alexander Moiseyev (born 1962) | 10 March 2024 | 2 April 2024 | 23 days |
| 8 | | Fleet admiral Alexander Moiseyev (born 1962) | 2 April 2024 | Incumbent | 2 years, 222 days |

== Deputies and chiefs of staff ==
Chief of the Main Staff and Deputy Commander-in-Chief of the Navy

- Valentin Selivanov (1992–1996)
- Igor Khmelnov (1996–1997)
- Vladimir Kuroyedov (1997)
- Viktor Kravchenko (1998–2005)
- Vladimir Masorin (2005)
- Mikhail Abramov (2005–2009)
- Aleksandr Tatarinov (2009–2016)
- Andrei Volozhinsky (2016–2019)
- Aleksandr Vitko (2019–2021)
- Aleksandr Nosatov (2021–2024)
- Vladimir Kasatonov (2024–present)
