= Yuri Startsev =

Russian naval officer

Yuri Vladimirovich Startsev
- Born: 11 August 1950 (age 75); Simferopol, USSR
- Allegiance: Soviet Union; Russia
- Branch: Soviet Navy; Russian Navy
- Service years: 1967-2005
- Rank: Vice-Admiral
- Commands: Caspian Flotilla
- Awards: Order of Military Merit; Order of Naval Merit; Order "For Service to the Homeland in the Armed Forces of the USSR" Second and Third Classes; Medal "For Battle Merit"

Yuri Vladimirovich Startsev (Russian: Юрий Владимирович Старцев; born 11 August 1950) is a retired officer of the Russian Navy. He holds the rank of Vice-Admiral, and served as commander of the Caspian Flotilla between 2002 and 2005.

== Biography ==
Startsev was born on 11 August 1950 in Simferopol, in what was then the Soviet Union. He entered the Soviet Navy, graduating from the Nakhimov Black Sea Higher Naval School in Sevastopol in 1972 with a specialisation in ship missile weaponry. After graduation he was assigned to the Caspian Flotilla, where over the next five years until 1977 he rose from the position of commander of an artillery combat unit, to commander of a medium landing ship. He carried out further studies at the Grechko Naval Academy, enrolling in 1977 and graduating in 1980, and returning to the Caspian Flotilla as commander of a division of training ships. In 1982, he was appointed chief of staff of a brigade of patrol ships, and then commander of a brigade of landing ships in 1986. In 1991 he was appointed chief of staff and first deputy commander of the Caspian Flotilla. In April 1993, he was promoted to the rank of rear-admiral.

On 26 December 2002, by decree of the President of Russia, confirmed by an order of the Minister of Defence on 27 December 2002, Startsev was appointed commander of the Caspian Flotilla. He held the post until November 2005, when he retired from active service. In retirement Startsev has remained active in veterans and educational affairs related to the Caspian Flotilla, speaking at conferences, and attending the 302nd anniversary of the foundation of the Caspian Flotilla on 15 November 2024. He became a council member of the Astrakhan regional branch of the Combat Brotherhood organisation.

== Honours and awards ==
Over his career Startsev has received the Order of Military Merit, the Order of Naval Merit, the Order "For Service to the Homeland in the Armed Forces of the USSR" Second and Third Classes, the Medal "For Battle Merit", and various other medals.

Military offices
Preceded by Vladimir Masorin	Commander of the Caspian Flotilla; 2002-2005	Succeeded by Viktor Kravchuk
