= Vladimir Kuroyedov =

Russian admiral (1944–2026)

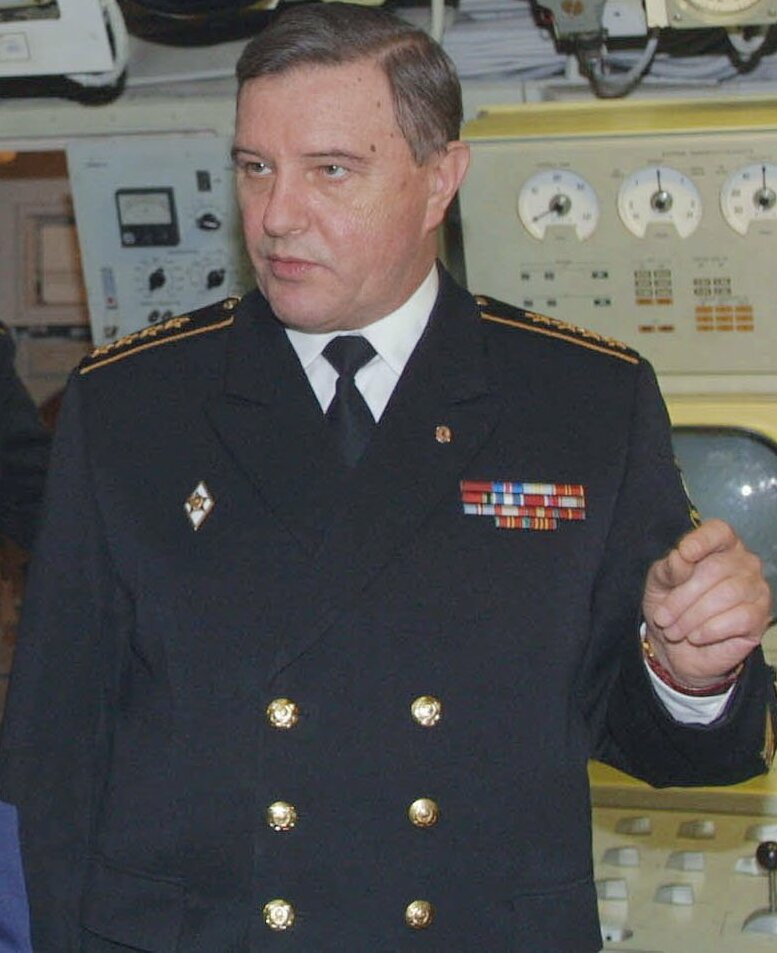
- Kuroyedov in 2001
- Native name: Владимир Иванович Куроедов
- Born: 5 September 1944; Bamburovo, Primorsky Krai, Russian SFSR, Soviet Union
- Died: 5 February 2026 (aged 81)
- Buried: Troyekurovskoye Cemetery, Moscow, Russia
- Allegiance: Soviet Union (prior to 1991); Russia
- Branch: Soviet Navy; Russian Navy
- Service years: 1967–2005
- Rank: Admiral of the Fleet
- Commands: Commander-in-Chief of the Russian Navy; Pacific Fleet; Primorsky Flotilla; Sakhalin Flotilla; SKR-46
- Awards: Order of Merit for the Fatherland; Order of Military Merit; Order for Service to the Homeland in the Armed Forces of the USSR, 3rd class
- Alma mater: Pacific Higher Naval School; Grechko Naval Academy; Voroshilov General Staff Academy

Admiral of the Fleet Vladimir Ivanovich Kuroyedov (Note: Russian: Владимир Иванович Куроедов) (5 September 1944 – 5 February 2026) was a Russian naval officer who was Commander-in-Chief of the Russian Navy from 1997 to 2005. His previous roles included chief of staff of the Baltic Fleet from 1993 to 1996, commander of the Pacific Fleet from 1996 to 1997, and Chief of the Main Staff and First Deputy Commander-in-Chief of the Navy in 1997. He started his career in the Soviet Navy by graduating from the Pacific Higher Naval School in 1967 and mostly served in the Pacific Fleet, later becoming a graduate of the Grechko Naval Academy and the Voroshilov General Staff Academy. He was the second officer to be promoted to admiral of the fleet in the Russian Federation. His tenure as the head of the navy coincided with several major accidents, most notably the Kursk submarine disaster in 2000.

== Early life and career ==
Kuroyedov was born on 5 September 1944 in Bamburovo, a settlement in the Khasansky District, Primorsky Krai, Soviet Union. He completed his secondary education in Ussuriysk, and in 1962 he entered the S. O. Makarov Pacific Higher Naval School, graduating in 1967 as an engineer-navigator officer in the Soviet Navy. He was a navigation officer from 1967 to 1971 on the patrol ship SKR-92, commanded the patrol ship SKR-46 from 1971 to 1973, and then was the senior assistant for training to the commander of the "Strelok" naval base. In 1976, he became the chief of staff and deputy commander of the 47th Security Ship Brigade. Kuroyedov later attended the Grechko Naval Academy and graduated in 1978.

== Senior career ==
In 1981, he became the commander of the Primorsky Flotilla minesweeper brigade, and from 1984 he was the chief of staff of the Sakhalin Flotilla and the operational squadron of the Pacific Fleet until 1987. In 1989, Kuroyedov graduated from the Voroshilov General Staff Academy and was promoted to rear admiral. Between then and 1990, he commanded the Sakhalin Flotilla, and then commanded the Primorsky Flotilla until 1993. On 2 August 1993, he became the Chief of Staff of the Baltic Fleet, and in February 1996 he was made the Commander of the Pacific Fleet. Starting from July 1997, Kuroyedov was the Chief of the Main Staff and First Deputy Commander-in-Chief of the Russian Navy for a few months. On 7 November 1997, he was appointed Commander-in-Chief of the Russian Navy, with the rank of admiral, and on 21 February 2000, he was promoted to admiral of the fleet, making him the second holder of the rank in the Russian Federation after Feliks Gromov.

Kuroyedov assumed command at a time when the Russian Navy faced a serious crisis due to a lack of funding and maintenance since the dissolution of the Soviet Union. In January 2003, he announced that one-fifth of the Russian fleet would have to be scrapped, because the navy did not receive the funding necessary to keep those ships in a working condition. He also said that since 1996 the navy had been given 12% of the budget that it expected. In March 2004, Kuroyedov received international attention after he claimed that the nuclear-powered cruiser Pyotr Veliky was in such a poor state that it could "explode any moment." He took back the statement hours later, saying that the ship's nuclear reactors were not any threat. Kuroyedov had a personal disagreement with the retired admiral Igor Kasatonov, who was a relative of the cruiser's then-captain, Vladimir Kasatonov.

His tenure as the head of the navy coincided with several major accidents involving naval ships. These most notably included the Kursk submarine disaster in August 2000, in which all 118 crewmen were killed, and the loss of the K-159 in August 2003 with the deaths of nine sailors. Several other incidents took place, including the February 2004 failure of a ballistic missile test being observed by President Vladimir Putin, and the March 2005 sinking of the bathyscaphe AS-28. After the Kursk disaster in 2000, Kuroyedov offered to resign, along with Defense Minister Igor Sergeyev and Northern Fleet commander Vyacheslav Popov, but their resignations were rejected by President Vladimir Putin.

He was retired on 4 September 2005, one day before his 61st birthday, and Admiral Vladimir Masorin assumed command as the next Commander-in-Chief. Around this time, Kuroyedov had been hospitalized due to an illness, disrupting his ability to carry out his duties. Conflicting views on Kuroyedov's retirement speculate either that he was dismissed because he had presided over too many naval embarrassments, including the sinking of Kursk or because the President wished to emphasize the need for greater discipline in the Navy.

In his retirement, Kuroyedov in 2006 became the leader of the "Admirals' Club" organization for retired senior officers of the Russian Navy. Kuroyedov died on 5 February 2026 after a long illness, at the age of 81. He was buried at the Troyekurovskoye Cemetery in Moscow.

== Honours and awards ==
- Order of Merit for the Fatherland, 3rd class (1999) and 2nd class (2020)
- Order of Military Merit (1996)
- Order for Service to the Homeland in the Armed Forces of the USSR, 3rd class (1990)
- Jubilee Medal "300 Years of the Russian Navy"
- Medal "In Commemoration of the 850th Anniversary of Moscow"
- Medal "For Military Valour" 1st class (Min Def)
- Medal "For Strengthening Military Cooperation" (Min Def)
- Medal "For diligence in carrying out engineering support tasks" (Min Def)
- Medal "200 Years of the Ministry of Defence" (Min Def)
- Jubilee Medal "In Commemoration of the 100th Anniversary of the Birth of Vladimir Ilyich Lenin"
- Jubilee Medal "Thirty Years of Victory in the Great Patriotic War 1941–1945"
- Medal "Veteran of the Armed Forces of the USSR"
- Jubilee Medal "50 Years of the Armed Forces of the USSR"
- Jubilee Medal "60 Years of the Armed Forces of the USSR"
- Jubilee Medal "70 Years of the Armed Forces of the USSR"
- Medal "For Impeccable Service" 1st, 2nd and 3rd classes

== Notes ==
Military offices
Preceded by Vladimir Grishanov	Chief of Staff of the Baltic Fleet; 1993–1996	Succeeded by Vladimir Komoyedov
Preceded by Igor Khmelnov	Commander of the Pacific Fleet; 1996–1997	Succeeded by Mikhail Zakharenko
Preceded by Igor Khmelnov	Chief of the Main Staff and First Deputy Commander-in-Chief of the Russian Navy; 1997	Succeeded by Viktor Kravchenko
Preceded by Feliks Gromov	Commander-in-Chief of the Russian Navy; 1997–2005	Succeeded by Vladimir Masorin
