= Vladimir Vysotsky (admiral) =

Russian admiral (1954–2021)

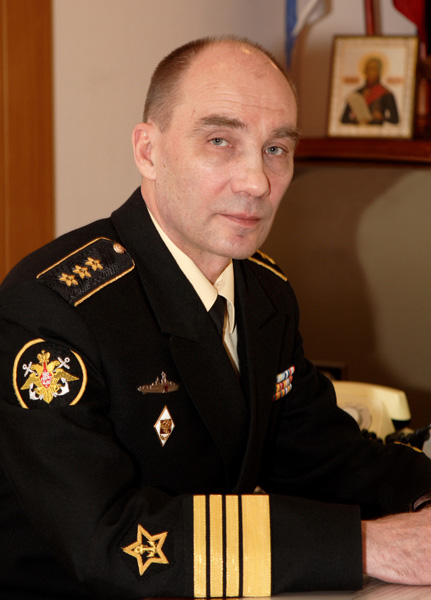
- Native name: Владимир Сергеевич Высоцкий
- Born: 18 August 1954; Komarno, Lviv Oblast, Ukrainian SSR, Soviet Union
- Died: February 5, 2021 (aged 66) Moscow, Russia
- Buried: Troyekurovskoye Cemetery
- Allegiance: Soviet Union (to 1991); Russia
- Branch: Soviet Navy; Russian Navy
- Service years: 1971–2012
- Rank: Admiral
- Commands: Commander-in-Chief of the Russian Navy; Northern Fleet; 36th Missile Ship Division; Minsk
- Awards: Order of Merit for the Fatherland; Order of Military Merit; Order for Service to the Homeland in the Armed Forces of the USSR, 3rd class
- Alma mater: Nakhimov Naval School; P.S. Nakhimov Black Sea Higher Naval School; N.G. Kuznetsov Naval Academy; Russian General Staff Academy
- Other work: Deputy General Director, ARMZ Uranium Holding

Vladimir Sergeyevich Vysotsky (Note: Russian: Владимир Серге́евич Высоцкий, Ukrainian: Володимир Сергійович Висоцький, romanized: Volodymyr Serhiiovych Vysotskyi) (18 August 1954 – 5 February 2021) was a Russian admiral who served as Commander-in-Chief of the Russian Navy from 2007 to 2012. He was previously the commander of the Northern Fleet from 2005 to 2007 and chief of staff of the Baltic Fleet from 2004 to 2005. Vysotsky graduated from the Nakhimov Naval School in 1971 and the P.S. Nakhimov Black Sea Higher Naval School in 1976.

== Career ==
Vysotsky was born in Komarno, Lviv Oblast, Ukrainian SSR on 18 August 1954. He joined the Navy, graduating from the Nakhimov Naval School in Leningrad in 1971, and from the P.S. Nakhimov Black Sea Higher Naval School in Sevastopol in 1976. He was posted to the Russian Pacific Fleet where he served aboard patrol ships, frigates and the Sverdlov-class cruiser Admiral Senyavin. In 1982 Vysotsky completed the Higher Special Officer Classes of the Navy and was made executive officer of the Kresta I-class cruiser Sevastopol from 1983 to 1986, and of the aircraft carrier Minsk from 1986 to 1988. He graduated from the N. G. Kuznetsov Naval Academy in 1990 and was the commanding officer of Minsk until 1992.

Subsequently, he commanded the Pacific Fleet's 36th Missile Ship Division, leaving that post in 1997. In 1999 he completed the Russian General Staff Academy and was appointed Chief of Staff, and from 21 January 2002, Commander of the Northern Fleet's surface flotilla. In the capacity he took part in the response effort to the Kursk submarine disaster in 2000. On 20 August 2004 he was appointed Chief of Staff and First Deputy Commander of the Baltic Fleet. On 26 September 2005 he was appointed Commander of the Northern Fleet, and was promoted to admiral in 2006. On 12 September 2007, Vysotsky was appointed Commander-in-Chief of the Russian Navy, succeeding Vladimir Masorin. In May 2012 he was succeeded as Commander-in-Chief by Admiral Viktor Chirkov.

From August 2013, he deputy general director of ARMZ Uranium Holding, a division of the corporation Rosatom. Vysotsky died of heart failure on 5 February 2021, at the age of 66. He was buried with military honours in the Troyekurovskoye Cemetery on 8 February 2021.

== Personal life ==
Vysotsky was married with two children.

== Honours and awards ==
- Order of Merit for the Fatherland, 4th class with Swords (1 October 2008)
- Order of Military Merit
- Order for Service to the Homeland in the Armed Forces of the USSR, 3rd class

== Sources ==
Military offices
Preceded by Mikhail Leopoldovich Abramov	Commander of the Northern Fleet; 2005–2007	Succeeded by Nikolai Maksimov
Preceded by Vladimir Masorin	Commander-in-Chief of the Russian Navy; 2007–2012	Succeeded by Viktor Chirkov
