= Andrei Volozhinsky =

Russian naval officer

Andrei Olgertovich Volozhinsky
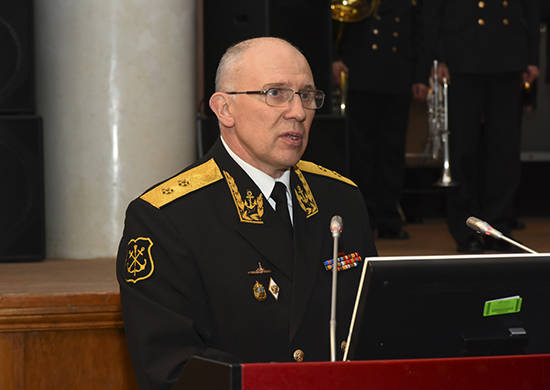
- Born: 4 June 1960 (age 65); Tallinn, Estonia
- Allegiance: Soviet Union; Russia
- Branch: Soviet Navy; Russian Navy
- Service years: 1977–present
- Rank: Vice-Admiral
- Commands: Northern Fleet (acting)
- Awards: Order of Military Merit; Order "For Merit to the Fatherland" Fourth Class

Andrei Olgertovich Volozhinsky (Russian: Андрей Ольгертович Воложинский; born 4 June 1960) is an officer of the Russian Navy. He holds the rank of vice-admiral, and has most recently served as the First Deputy Commander-in-Chief of the Russian Navy and Chief of the Main Staff of the Navy, between 2016 and 2019.

Born in 1960, Volozhinsky began his education in naval institutions, graduating from the Nakhimov Naval School in 1977, and the M.V. Frunze Higher Naval School in 1982. His active service began with the Northern Fleet, where he served on submarines, eventually rising to his own command of a nuclear ballistic missile submarine. After further study, this time at the N. G. Kuznetsov Naval Academy, he became chief of staff and deputy commander, and then commander, of one of the fleet's submarine divisions. From here he rose to take command of the fleet's 12th submarine squadron, comprising its nuclear ballistic missile submarines. This placed him in command of a substantial portion of Russia's naval nuclear forces, and Russian nuclear weapons in general.

After completing studies at the Military Academy of the General Staff of the Armed Forces Volozhinsky was appointed Chief of Staff and First Deputy Commander of the Northern Fleet, spending several months in 2011 as acting commander of the fleet. He then began service with the General Operations Directorate of the General Staff of the Russian Armed Forces, and in 2016 became First Deputy Commander-in-Chief of the Russian Navy and Chief of the General Staff of the Navy. Over his career he has been awarded the Order of Military Merit and the Order "For Merit to the Fatherland" Fourth Class.

== Education and early service ==
Volozhinsky was born on 4 June 1960 in Tallinn, Estonia then part of the Soviet Union. He entered the Nakhimov Naval School in Leningrad in 1975, graduating in 1977. Between 1977 and 1982 he studied at the M.V. Frunze Higher Naval School and began service with the Northern Fleet on his graduation, initially as in an officer commanding a naval warhead unit, rising to the post of assistant commander of a submarine in 1991. He took the Higher Special Officer Classes of the Navy, graduating in 1992 and then serving as senior assistant commander of a submarine until 1995. That year he took command of the second crew of the nuclear ballistic missile submarine K-496 Borisoglebsk of the Northern Fleet. He held this post until 1999, and in July 2001, after graduating from the N. G. Kuznetsov Naval Academy, he was appointed chief of staff and deputy commander of the 31st Submarine Division.

== Submarine commands ==
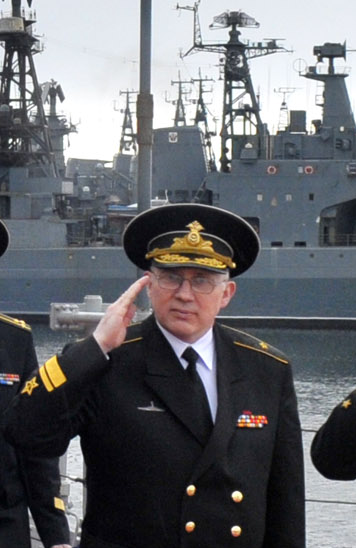
Volozhinsky salutes during the 2011 visit by US naval officers, led by Admiral Gary Roughead

From December 2002 until 2005 Volozhinsky served as commander of the submarine division, and from 31 August 2005 was chief of staff and first deputy commander of the Northern Fleet's 12th submarine squadron. In August 2009 Rear-Admiral Volozhinsky was appointed commander of the 12th submarine squadron, succeeding Rear-Admiral Sergei Farkov on his appointment as deputy commander of the Baltic Fleet. In 2009 the 12th submarine squadron was one of two submarine squadrons of the Northern Fleet, comprising three divisions, the 18th, 24th, and Volozhinsky's old command, the 31st, with the 31st containing its nuclear ballistic missile submarines. Of these divisions, the 31st was the most significant, consisting of six Project 667BDRM Delfin-class submarines carrying 96 RSM-54 missiles with 384 nuclear warheads, comprising almost 14% of the total number of all strategic Russian warheads and 63% of Russia's naval strategic nuclear forces. The 18th consisted of three Project 941 Akula-class vessels, and the 24th of six Project 971 Shchuka-B-class boats. Under Volozhinsky's command at this time happened to be his brother Mikhail, serving as commander of the Project 941 Akula-class submarine TK-20 Severstal.

== Higher flag positions ==
Also in 2009 Volozhinsky completed his studies at the Military Academy of the General Staff of the Armed Forces and in February 2010 he was appointed Chief of Staff and First Deputy Commander of the Northern Fleet. From 30 March to 24 June 2011 he served as acting commander of the Northern Fleet, after the previous commander, Admiral Nikolai Maksimov, was appointed chief of staff and first deputy commander of the troops of the Western Military District. On 11 May 2011 he hosted US Chief of Naval Operations Admiral Gary Roughead during his visit to the Northern Fleet. During the visit, Volozhinsky and Roughead toured the nuclear battlecruiser Pyotr Velikiy, and the submarine B-534 Nizhny Novgorod.

In September 2012 Volozhinsky began serving in the General Operations Directorate of the General Staff of the Russian Armed Forces, and on 12 June 2013 was promoted to vice-admiral. On 25 January 2016 it was announced that Volozhinsky had been appointed First Deputy Commander-in-Chief of the Russian Navy and Chief of the General Staff of the Navy. He succeeded Admiral Aleksandr Tatarinov, who had held the position since July 2009. He served as such until December 2019, when he was succeeded by Admiral Aleksandr Vitko. Over his career Volozhinsky has been awarded the Order of Military Merit and the Order "For Merit to the Fatherland" Fourth Class, as well as numerous medals.

=== Sanctions ===
He was sanctioned by the UK government in 2022 in relation to the Russo-Ukrainian War.

Military offices
Preceded by Aleksandr Tatarinov	Chief of the Main Staff and First Deputy Commander-in-Chief of the Russian Navy; 2016–2019	Succeeded by Aleksandr Vitko
