= Aleksandr Moiseyev (admiral) =

Russian naval officer (born 1962)

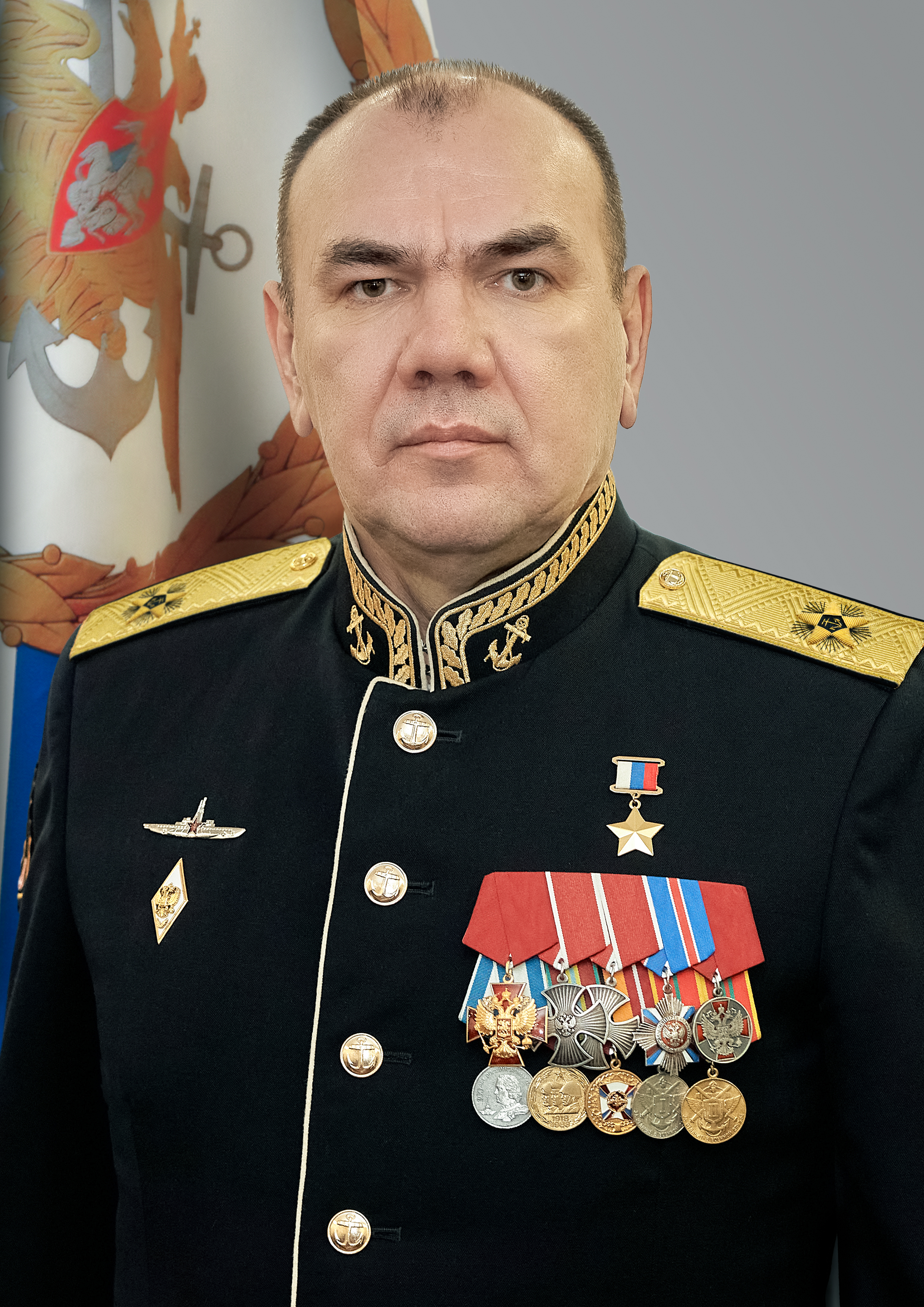
- Official portrait, 2025
- Native name: Александр Алексеевич Моисеев
- Born: 16 April 1962 (age 64); Borskoye Gvardeysky District, Kaliningrad Oblast, Russian SFSR, Soviet Union
- Allegiance: Soviet Union (to 1991); Russia
- Branch: Soviet Navy; Russian Navy
- Service years: 1981–present
- Rank: Admiral of the Fleet
- Commands: Black Sea Fleet; Northern Fleet; Commander-in-Chief of the Russian Navy
- Awards: Hero of the Russian Federation; Order of Courage (twice); Order of Military Merit; Medal of the Order "For Merit to the Fatherland", second class
- Education: A. S. Popov Naval Radio-Electronic Institute; Kuznetsov Naval Academy; Russian General Staff Academy

Aleksandr Alekseyevich Moiseyev (Note: Russian: Александр Алексеевич Моисеев) (born 16 April 1962) has been the Commander-in-Chief of the Russian Navy since 2024.

He was called up for military service in 1981 and was commissioned in the Soviet Navy in 1987. He was awarded the title Hero of the Russian Federation in 2011. In 2018 he took command of the Black Sea Fleet, and oversaw a period of expansion within the fleet. He has also courted controversy with regards to relations with Ukraine following the Russian-Ukrainian conflict, and the Kerch Strait incident in November 2018. In May 2019 he was appointed commander of the Northern Fleet, and Northern Fleet Joint Strategic Command. He was promoted to admiral in 2020.

In March 2024, Moiseyev became the final commander of the district, and was appointed as acting commander in chief of the Russian Navy, before officially taking office on 2 April, replacing Nikolai Yevmenov.

== Early career ==
Moiseyev was born on 16 April 1962 in the settlement of Borskoye, in the Gvardeysky District of Kaliningrad Oblast, in the Soviet Union. He attended high school and a specialist film school in Sovetsk, Kaliningrad Oblast, and then worked as a technician in a film repair shop in the city of Berezniki, Perm Oblast. In 1981 he was called up for military service in the Ural Military District, and between 1982 and 1987 he studied at the A. S. Popov Naval Radio-Electronic Institute in Leningrad. He then joined the Northern Fleet, where he would spend the next 29 years, initially as an engineer on nuclear-powered submarines, and rising by the end to the post of commander of the fleet's submarine squadron.

== Submariner ==
From June 1987 he was part of the computer engineering division, and from September 1990, head of the electronic warfare division. In February 1992 he became senior assistant commander for combat aboard the K-117 Bryansk. From July to October 1994 he was senior assistant to the commander of the Project 667BDRM Delfin-class ballistic missile submarine K-18 Karelia. While serving in this post, he participated in a voyage to the North Pole, where the submarine surfaced and on Russia's Navy Day, raised the St. Andrew and Russian flags on the ice. For his part in this Moiseyev was awarded the Order of Courage. Between 1994 and 1995 he took the navy's Higher Special Officer Classes and later commanded the ballistic missile submarine K-407 Novomoskovsk. On 7 July 1998 the submarine launched two German commercial micro-satellites Tubsat-N and Tubsat-N1 using the Shtil' carrier rocket, while submerged in the Barents Sea. This was, according to Space Today Online, "the first time a commercial payload had ever been sent from Earth into orbit from a submarine and the first commercial space launch in the history of the Russian Navy".

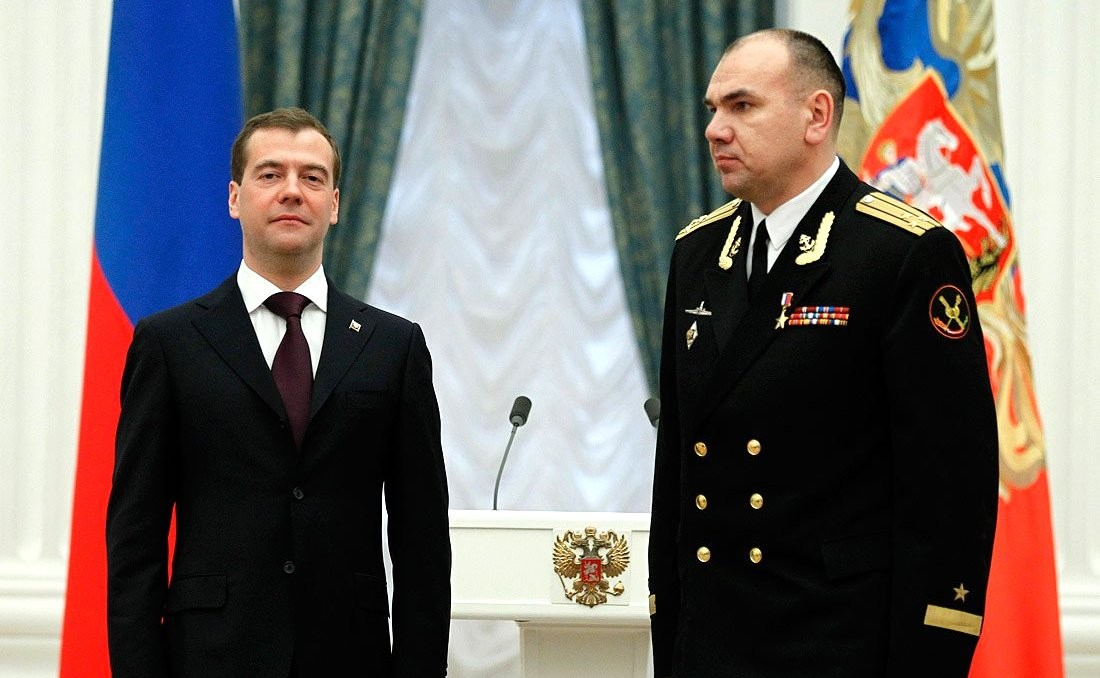
1st Captain Moiseyev with Russian president Dmitry Medvedev on 21 February 2011 for the award of the title of Hero of the Russian Federation

He entered the N. G. Kuznetsov Naval Academy in 2001, graduating with honours in 2003, and then served until 2007 as Chief of Staff of the 31st Submarine Division of the Northern Fleet, followed by commander of the division until 2009. In 2008 he was senior officer aboard the K-44 Ryazan during her transfer from the Northern Fleet to the Pacific Fleet, spending long periods submerged beneath the Arctic ice. For this feat he was awarded a second Order of Courage. He enrolled in the Military Academy of the General Staff in 2009, graduating in 2011 with first class honours and the distinction of a gold medal. On 14 February 2011 he was awarded the title of Hero of the Russian Federation. In the awards ceremony on 21 February, President of the Russian Federation Dmitry Medvedev announced

"The Gold Star of the Hero of Russia is awarded to Alexander Alekseevich Moiseyev, commander of the strategic division of submarines of the Northern Fleet. During his combat patrols, under his leadership, tests of the newest weapons were successfully conducted and a whole series of rocket launches were carried out. As Supreme Commander, I watched these exercises. And, indeed, everything was done to a very high standard."

== Flag rank and the Black Sea ==
In June 2011, Moiseyev was appointed Deputy Commander of the Northern Fleet's submarine forces, and in April 2012 he became their commander. Promoted to rear admiral on 20 February 2013, he served as a deputy to the Council of Deputies of Alexandrovsk, Murmansk Oblast, and on 5 April 2016 he was appointed Chief of Staff of the Northern Fleet. On 22 November 2017 he was appointed Deputy Chief of the General Staff of the Armed Forces of the Russian Federation, and on 14 May 2018 he became Acting Commander of the Black Sea Fleet, succeeding Admiral Aleksandr Vitko. He was confirmed in his post on 26 June 2018. H

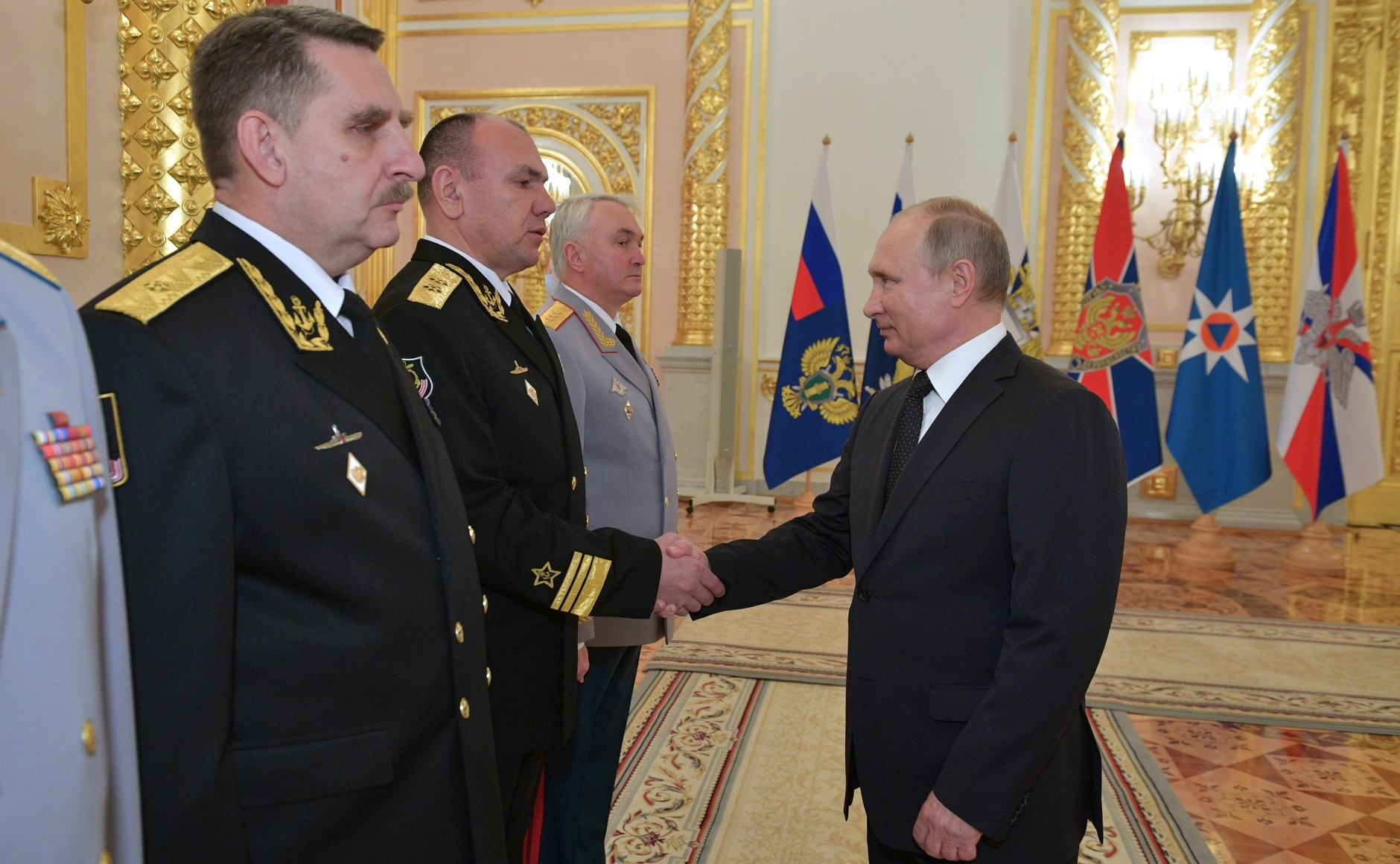
Moiseyev, along with Andrey Kartapolov (far right), at the award ceremony, bestowed by Vladimir Putin, 25 October 2018

He has been awarded the Order of Courage twice, as well as the Order of Military Merit and the Medal of the Order "For Merit to the Fatherland", second class. The Black Sea Fleet is currently undergoing expansion, and in 2019 he announced that six new combat ships and six support vessels would enter service with the fleet that year.

On 16 February 2019, Moiseyev was one of seven Russian personnel notified by investigators of Security Service of Ukraine of suspicion of "engaging in an aggressive war or aggressive military actions", relating to the Kerch Strait incident in November 2018. Colonel-General Aleksandr Dvornikov, Commander of the Southern Military District, was also one of those notified. By a presidential decree on 3 May 2019, Moiseyev was appointed commander of the Northern Fleet, succeeding Admiral Nikolai Yevmenov, who has been appointed Commander-in-Chief of the Russian Navy. Moiseyev was promoted to the rank of admiral on 10 December 2020.

In March 2024, according to Izvestia, he replaced Nikolai Yevmenov as acting commander in chief of the Russian Navy. He was confirmed as the commander in chief on 2 April 2024. On 9 December 2025, Moiseyev was promoted to the rank of admiral of the fleet by President Vladimir Putin.

== See also ==
- List of Heroes of the Russian Federation

== Notes ==
Military offices
Preceded by Nikolai Yevmenov	Chief of Staff of the Northern Fleet; 2016–2017	Succeeded by Vladimir Grishechkin
Preceded by Aleksandr Vitko	Commander of the Black Sea Fleet; 2018–2019	Succeeded by Igor Osipov
Preceded by Nikolai Yevmenov	Commander of the Northern Fleet; 2019–2024	Succeeded by Konstantin Kabantsov
Preceded by Nikolai Yevmenov	Commander of the Northern Fleet Joint Strategic Command; 2019–2024	Command dissolved
Preceded by Nikolai Yevmenov	Commander-in-Chief of the Russian Navy; 2024–present	Incumbent
