= Mikhail Leopoldovich Abramov =

Russian naval officer

- Born: 6 July 1956 (age 69); Vladivostok, Russian SFSR, Soviet Union
- Allegiance: Soviet Union; Russia
- Branch: Soviet Navy; Russian Navy
- Service years: 1973-2009
- Rank: Admiral
- Commands: Northern Fleet
- Awards: Order "For Merit to the Fatherland" fourth class; Order of Military Merit

Mikhail Leopoldovich Abramov (Russian: Михаил Леопольдович Абрамов; born 6 July 1956) was an officer of the Soviet and Russian Navies. He held the rank of admiral, and served as commander of the Northern Fleet from 2004 to 2005, and chief of staff and first deputy Commander-in-Chief of the Russian Navy between 2005 and 2009.

== Biography ==
Abramov was born on 6 July 1956 in Vladivostok, in what was then the Russian Soviet Federative Socialist Republic, in the Soviet Union. He was born into a naval family, his father, Leopold Abramov, was a captain 1st rank who commanded destroyers, was the executive officer of a cruiser, and head of the mine and anti-submarine weapon department at the Pacific Higher Naval School in Vladivostok. His mother worked at a submarine repair plant and also taught at the Pacific Higher Naval School. Mikhail Abramov also entered the Soviet Navy, studying at the Pacific Higher Naval School from 1973 to 1978, graduating with a specialisation in electrical engineering. He was first assigned to the Pacific Fleet as commander of a weapons post aboard the Krivak-class frigate Storozhevoy from 1978 until 1980, and then mine-torpedo warhead unit commander from 1980 to 1981. Over the following years he rose to be an executive officer from 1981 to 1983, and took the Higher Special Officer Classes of the Navy between 1983 and 1984. He then served as commander of the Retivyy from 1984 to 1987, and then studied at the Grechko Naval Academy from 1987 to 1989. On graduating he served as chief of staff of the 202nd Anti-Submarine Ship Brigade from 1989 to 1990, and then deputy commander of the 183rd Anti-Submarine Ship Brigade.

From 1990 to 1995, Abramov was chief of staff, and then commander of the 35th surface ship division. By 1992, Abramov was a captain 2nd rank and in command of a detachment consisting of the Udaloy-class destroyer Admiral Vinogradov and the Boris Chilikin-class fleet oiler Boris Butoma deployed to the Persian Gulf. From 1995 to 1998, he was chief of staff of the Kamchatka Flotilla, and then its commander, until attending the Military Academy of the General Staff from 1999 to 2001. On graduating, he returned to the Pacific to serve as commander of the Primorskaya Flotilla from December 2001 to 21 July 2003. He was then appointed chief of staff and first deputy commander of the Baltic Fleet in August 2003, and on 29 May 2004, commander of the Northern Fleet. He held this post until 4 September 2005, when he was appointed chief of staff and first deputy Commander-in-Chief of the Navy, succeeding Admiral Vladimir Masorin on his appointment as navy commander-in-chief. He remained in this role until his retirement on 7 June 2009. His retirement was unexpected, but came after taking an early holiday, and then a period of hospitalisation. He then announced his retirement on health grounds, and was succeeded by Vice-Admiral Aleksandr Tatarinov. Over his career he had carried out a number of long-distance voyages, visiting ports in Vietnam, Bahrain, the United Arab Emirates, and Japan.

Abramov is married, with a son.

== Honours and awards ==
Over his career Abramov has received the Order "For Merit to the Fatherland" fourth class, the Order of Military Merit, and various other medals.
