= Vladimir Masorin =

Russian admiral (born 1947)

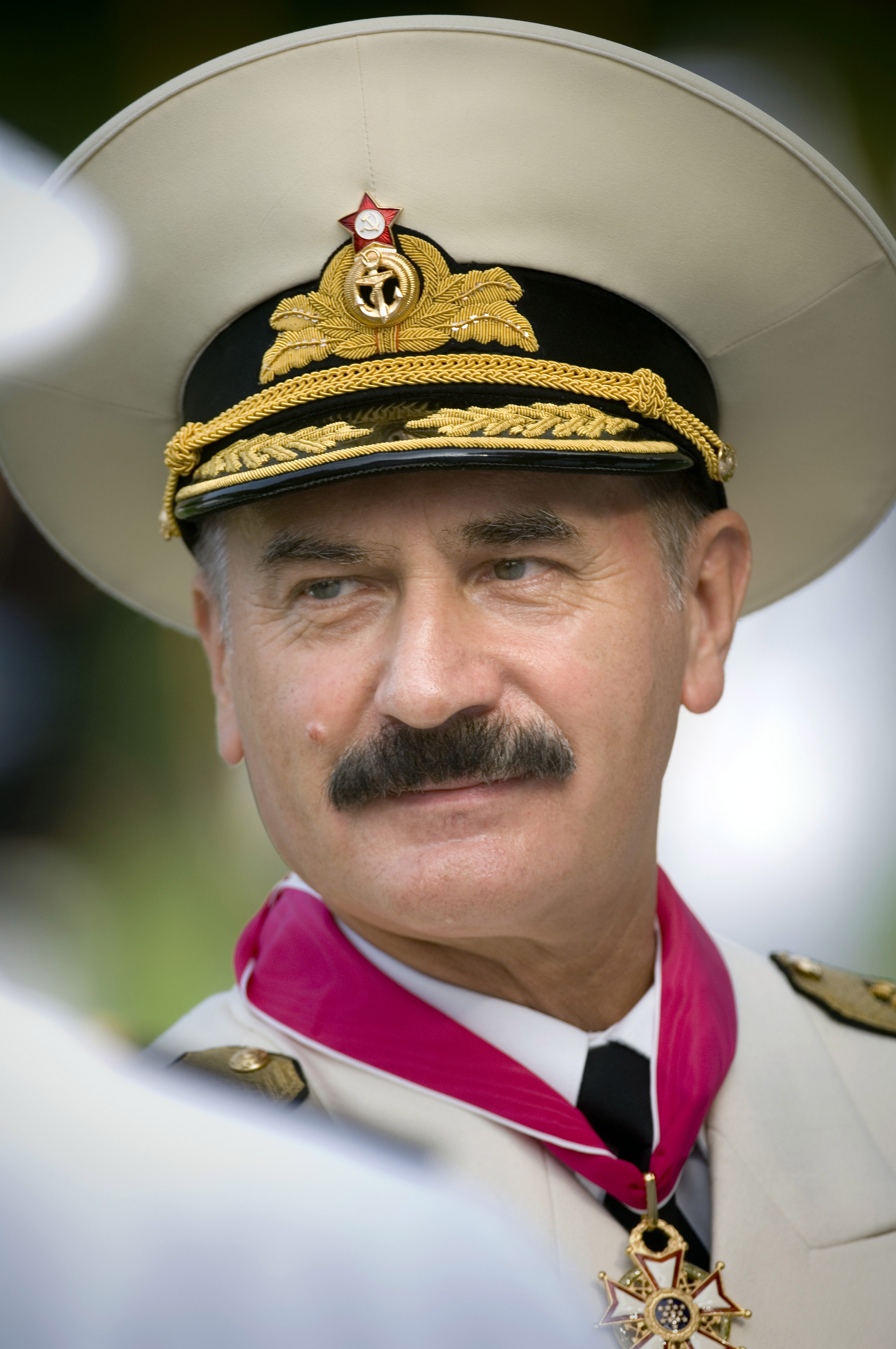
- Masorin receiving the U.S. Legion of Merit in 2007
- Born: Vladimir Vasilyevich Masorin; 24 August 1947 (age 78); Bely, Kalinin Oblast, Russian SFSR, Soviet Union
- Allegiance: Soviet Union (to 1991); Russia
- Branch: Soviet Navy; Russian Navy
- Service years: 1970–2007
- Rank: Admiral of the Fleet
- Commands: Commander-in-Chief of the Russian Navy; Black Sea Fleet; Caspian Sea Flotilla; 7th Operational Squadron; Zhguchy; Otchayanny
- Awards: Order of Military Merit; Order of the Red Banner of Labour; Order for Service to the Homeland in the Armed Forces of the USSR, 3rd class Legion of Merit, Commander
- Alma mater: Nakhimov Black Sea Higher Naval School; Grechko Naval Academy; Russian General Staff Academy

Admiral of the Fleet Vladimir Vasilyevich Masorin (Note: Russian: Владимир Васильевич Масорин) (born 24 August 1947) is a retired Russian naval officer who was Commander-in-Chief of the Russian Navy from 2005 to 2007. He was previously the Chief of the Main Staff and First Deputy Commander-in-Chief in 2005, and commanded the Black Sea Fleet from 2002 to 2005 and the Caspian Flotilla from 1996 to 2002. He was commissioned from the Nakhimov Black Sea Higher Naval School in Crimea in 1970, and commanded two destroyers, a destroyer brigade, and a squadron before reaching higher command. Masorin also graduated from the Grechko Naval Academy and the Russian General Staff Academy. As the head of the Russian navy he oversaw increased cooperation with NATO countries, for which he was made a Commander of the Legion of Merit by the United States.

== Early naval service ==
Masorin was born on 25 August 1947 in Bely, Kalinin Oblast (modern-day Bely, Tver Oblast), in the Russian SFSR of the Soviet Union. He graduated from the Nakhimov Black Sea Higher Naval School in Sevastopol, Crimean Oblast, in 1970. His later military education included the Higher Special Officer Classes of the Navy in 1977, the Grechko Naval Academy in 1986, and the General Staff Academy in 1993.

He served as principal warfare officer on the Kashin-class destroyer Smyshlyony of the Northern Fleet. In 1977 he completed additional officer training and became executive officer of the Kashin-class destroyer Ognevoy. In November 1980 he became commanding officer of the Sovremenny-class destroyer Otchayanny, and the ship underwent sea trials under his command, before joining the 56th Destroyer Brigade of the Northern Fleet. Not long after that he commanded the Kanin-class destroyer Zhguchy.

In 1983 Masorin became chief of staff of the Northern Fleet's destroyer brigade. After completing the Kuznetsov Naval Academy he was appointed commander of the Northern Fleet's destroyer brigade in 1987. He later commanded the 7th Operational Squadron of the Northern Fleet from 1989.

== Senior naval command ==
Following completion of the General Staff Academy in 1993, Masorin was the chief of staff and deputy commander of the Kola Flotilla of the Northern Fleet, before being assigned as commander of the Caspian Flotilla in August 1996. He rose to prominence in the Russian media when in the summer of 2002, Russian President Vladimir Putin and Defense Minister Sergei Ivanov gave high praise to the naval drills that he oversaw in the Caspian Sea. On 9 October 2002 Masorin became commander of the Black Sea Fleet and around that time was also promoted to the rank of admiral. Under his command, the Black Sea Fleet was rated for being one of the best formations of the Navy and undertook drills with foreign partners. In September 2004 they participated in the "Ioniex-2004" drill with the Italian Navy, and they later took part in the NATO-led Operation Active Endeavor in the Mediterranean Sea.

On 17 February 2005 Masorin was made the Chief of the Main Staff and First Deputy Commander-in-Chief of the Russian Navy. He was in that post until 4 September 2005, when he was appointed the Commander-in-Chief of the Russian Navy, succeeding Admiral of the Fleet Vladimir Kuroyedov. Masorin assumed command of the Navy in the wake of several high-profile accidents and after years of under-maintenance of the fleet due to a lack of funding. He acknowledged that the Navy's inadequate ability to respond to accidents and also called for a reduced fleet, centered around submarine and nuclear forces as opposed to a large ocean-going navy as had been advocated by Kuroyedov. He was also promoted to admiral of the fleet after becoming Commander-in-Chief of the Navy.

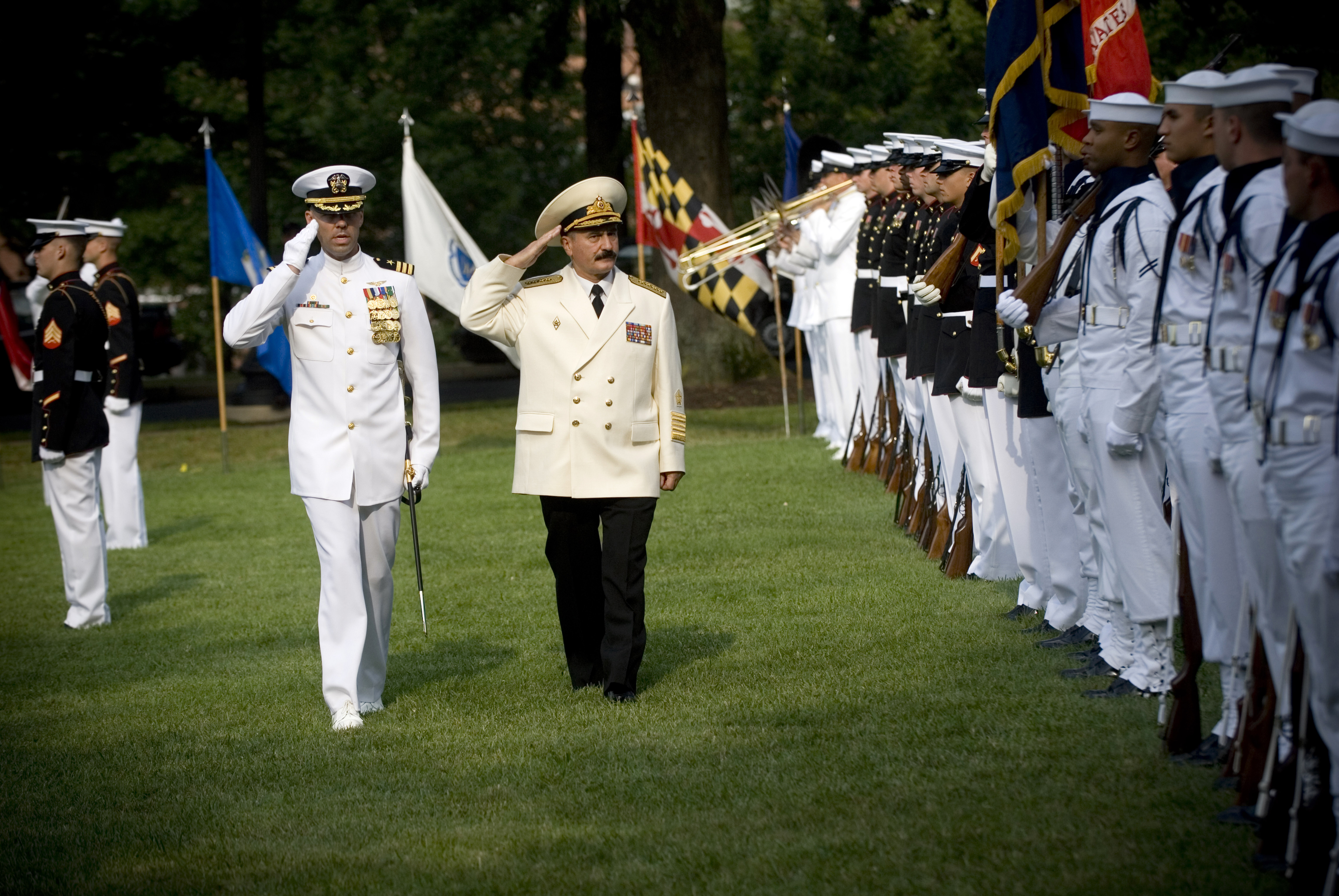
Masorin reviews the U.S. Navy Ceremonial Guard in Washington

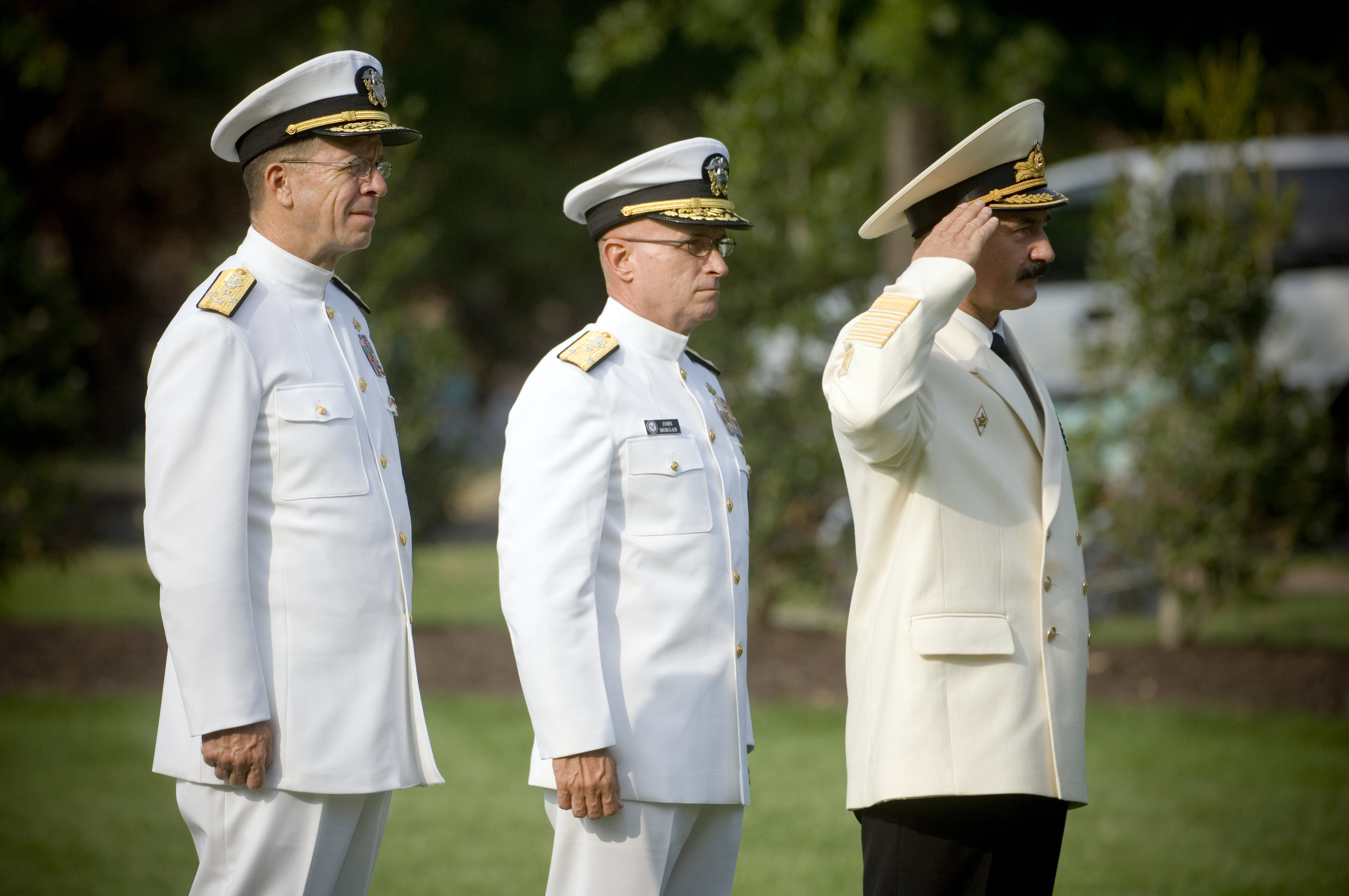
Masorin (right) with Mike Mullen, the U.S. Navy's Chief of Naval Operations

During his tenure as Commander-in-Chief, the Russian Navy in 2006 began preparing its naval base in Tartus Governorate, Syria, for the deployment of a naval task force there for the first time since 1991. In 2007 a large naval exercise was carried out in that area involving the aircraft carrier Admiral Kuznetsov. In late 2005 and early 2006, during a controversy between Russia and Ukraine over basing rights in Crimea, Masorin said that the Black Sea Fleet will continue to use the facility until at least 2017.

On 10 July 2006, Masorin was on board a Russian Navy Tupolev Tu-134 which crashed on takeoff from Gvardeyskoye Air Base, Simferopol, Ukraine. He and the other occupants survived the crash and subsequent fire.

In June 2007, he announced that the Navy will not have conscripts in sea-going roles after 2009, which will be filled by volunteer enlisted sailors, but will have them in shore-based roles.

On August 24, 2007, Masorin became the first Russian recipient of the Legion of Merit (Commander) from the United States. His award was conferred by U.S. Navy Chief of Naval Operations Michael Mullen, for meritorious conduct to increase cooperation and interoperability with the U.S. Navy and the North Atlantic Treaty Organization from September 2005 to August 2007. Under his leadership the Russian Federation's navy participated in operation Active Endeavor, a NATO maritime counter-terrorism operation in the Mediterranean Sea. He consistently advocated continued Russian participation in the joint and combined military exercises including BALTOPS, Northern Eagle FRUKUS and Pacific Eagle. His visit to Washington, D.C., during which he received the Legion of Merit was first official visit of a Russian Federation Navy commander-in-chief in eleven years.

Admiral of the Fleet Masorin retired on 13 September 2007, not long after reaching his 60th birthday, the normal retirement age, and was succeeded by Admiral Vladimir Vysotsky.

== Personal life ==
He is married and has two sons.

== Awards and decorations ==
Russian and Soviet

- Order of the Red Banner of Labour
- Order of Military Merit
- Order for Service to the Homeland in the Armed Forces of the USSR, 3rd class
- Order of Saint Vladimir of the Russian Orthodox Church

Foreign

- United States: Legion of Merit

== Notes ==
Military offices
Preceded by Boris Zinin	Commander of the Caspian Flotilla; 1996–2002	Succeeded by Yuri Startsev
Preceded by Vladimir Komoyedov	Commander of the Black Sea Fleet; 2002–2005	Succeeded by Aleksandr Tatarinov
Preceded by Viktor Kravchenko	Chief of the Main Staff and First Deputy Commander-in-Chief of the Russian Navy; 2005	Succeeded by Mikhail Abramov
Preceded by Vladimir Kuroyedov	Commander-in-Chief of the Russian Navy; 2005–2007	Succeeded by Vladimir Vysotsky
