= Aleksandr Vitko =

Russian retired admiral (b. 1961)

Aleksandr Viktorovich Vitko
- Александр Викторович Витко
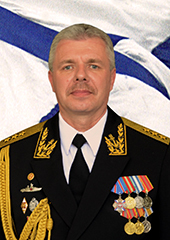
- Born: September 8, 1961 (age 65); Vitebsk, Byelorussian SSR, USSR
- Military career
- Allegiance: Soviet Union (to 1991); Russia
- Branch: Soviet Navy; Russian Navy
- Service years: 1979–2021
- Rank: Admiral
- Commands: Black Sea Fleet
- Conflicts: Russo-Ukrainian war

Admiral Aleksandr Viktorovich Vitko (Note: Russian: Александр Викторович Витко) (born September 13, 1961) is a retired officer of the Russian Navy, and a former commander of the Russian Black Sea Fleet between April 2013 and June 2018.

== Biography ==
Aleksandr Vitko was born September 13, 1961, in Vitebsk, the Byelorussian SSR. In 1984 he graduated from the Nakhimov Higher Naval School, and served in the Pacific Fleet. During 2009-2013 he was the Deputy commander of the Northern Fleet.

Vitko took command of the Black Sea Fleet on April 15, 2013.

Vitko took an active part in the annexation of Crimea by the Russian Federation. He delivered to Ukrainian troops an ultimatum to surrender before 5:00 am on March 4, threatening to storm the offices and units of the armed forces of Ukraine in the Crimea. On March 4, 2014, together with Aleksei Chaly he visited the headquarters of the Naval Forces of Ukraine. The next day, he was prosecuted by the general prosecutor of Ukraine on charges of incitement to treason and sabotage against the organization of the Ukrainian troops.

The Russian Defense Ministry called this an attempt of provocation aimed to destabilize the situation in Crimea. According to Deputy Defense Minister Anatoly Antonov, the Black Sea Fleet commander performed his duties lawfully, in strict compliance with the Russian-Ukrainian agreements on basing the Russian fleet in Ukraine and the Charter of the Armed Forces of the Russian Federation. On March 12, 2014, the Investigative Committee of the Russian Federation opened a criminal investigation into the illegal decision of the General Prosecutor's Office against Aleksandr Vitko. He would be included amongst the individuals who were targeted with asset freezes, travel bans, and sanctions by the European Union and the United States.

On June 26, 2018, it was announced that Vitko was replaced by Vice-Admiral Aleksandr Moiseyev and assigned "a new place of military service in the Navy High Command."

In 2019 Vitko was appointed Chief of the General Staff of the Navy, replacing Vice-Admiral Andrei Volozhinsky, and was seen as a potential political replacement for Dmitry Ovsyannikov.

== Personal life ==
In March 2014 the EU enacted sanctions against Aleksandr Vitko in relation to the violation of Ukrainian sovereign territory.

He was sanctioned by the UK government in 2014 in relation to the Russo-Ukrainian War.
