= Soviet frigate Neukrotimyy =

Krivak-class frigate

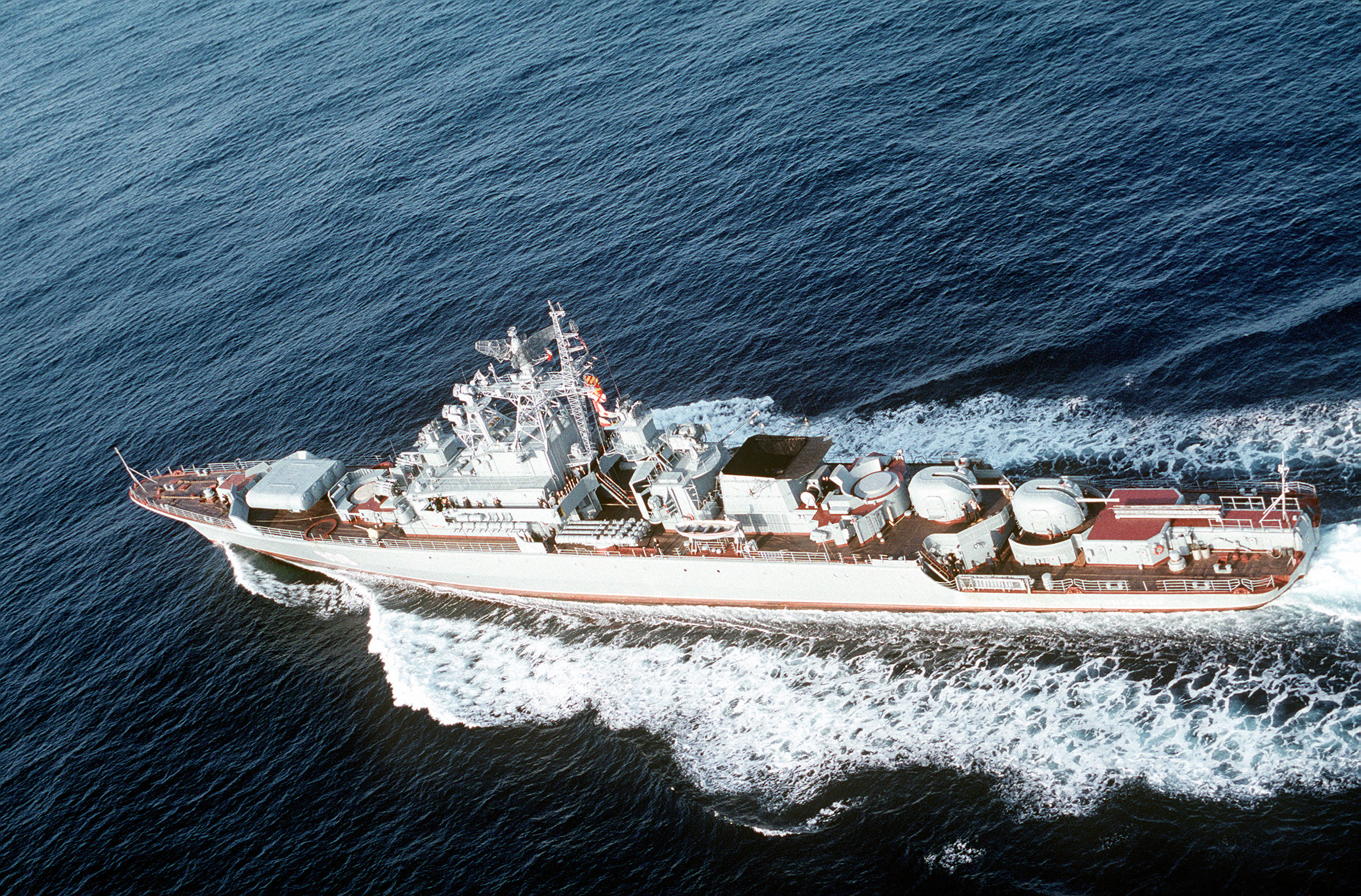
- Sister ship Pytlivyy underway on 10 December 1991.

History

Soviet Union → Russia
- Name: Neukrotimyy
- Namesake: Russian for Indomitable
- Builder: Yantar shipyard, Kaliningrad
- Yard number: 163
- Laid down: 22 January 1976
- Launched: 7 September 1977
- Commissioned: 30 December 1977
- Decommissioned: 29 June 2009
- Fate: Sank while in storage at Baltiysk

General characteristics
- Class & type: Project 1135M Burevestnik frigate
- Displacement: 2,935 t (2,889 long tons; 3,235 short tons) (standard); 3,305 t (3,253 long tons; 3,643 short tons) (full load)
- Length: 123 m (403 ft 7 in)
- Beam: 14.2 m (46 ft 7 in)
- Draft: 4.5 m (14 ft 9 in)
- Installed power: 44,000 shp (33,000 kW)
- Propulsion: 4 gas turbines; COGAG; 2 shafts
- Speed: 32 kn (59 km/h)
- Range: 3,900 nmi (7,223 km) at 14 kn (26 km/h)
- Complement: 23 officers, 171 ratings
- Sensors & processing systems: MR-310A Angara-A air/surface search radar; Don navigational radar; MR-143 Lev-214 fire control radar; MG-332T Titan-2T, MG-325 Vega, 2 MG-7 Braslet and MGS-400K sonars
- Electronic warfare & decoys: PK-16 decoy-dispenser system
- Armament: 4 × URPK-5 Rastrub (SS-N-14 'Silex') anti-submarine and anti-shipping missiles (1×4); 4 × ZIF-122 4K33 launchers (2×2) with 40 4K33 OSA-M (SA-N-4'Gecko') surface to air missiles (2×2); 2 × 100 mm (4 in) AK-100 guns (2×1); 2 × RBU-6000 Smerch-2 anti-submarine rockets; 8 × 533 mm (21 in) torpedo tubes (2×4)

Neukrotimyy (Russian: Неукротимый, "Inquisitive") was a Project 1135M Burevestnik-class (Russian: Буревестник, "Petrel") Guard Ship (Сторожевой Корабль, SKR) or 'Krivak II'-class frigate that served with the Soviet and Russian Navies. The vessel was known as Komsomolets Litvyy (Russian: Комсомолец Литвы, romanized: "Lithuanian Komsomolets") between 1987 and 1990. Launched on 17 September 1977, Neukrotimyy was designed to operate as an anti-submarine vessel with the Baltic Fleet, using an armament built around the Metel Anti-Ship Complex. The vessel undertook many visits to other countries outside the Soviet Unions, including Angola, East Germany, Nigeria and Poland. Following the dissolution of the Soviet Union, in 1991, the ship was transferred to the Russian Navy and continued to travel to countries like the Netherlands. Despite being accidentally holed in 2005 and being badly burnt in a fire in 2008, Neukrotimyy remained the penultimate of the class to remain in service, finally being decommissioned on 29 June 2009.

== Design and development ==
Neukrotimyy was one of eleven Project 1135M ships launched between 1975 and 1981. Project 1135, the Burevestnik (Russian: Буревестник, "Petrel") class, was envisaged by the Soviet Navy as a less expensive complement to the Project 1134A Berkut A (NATO reporting name 'Kresta II') and Project 1134B Berkut B (NATO reporting name 'Kara') classes of anti-submarine ships. Project 1135M was an improvement developed in 1972 with slightly increased displacement and heavier guns compared with the basic 1135. The design, by N. P. Sobolov, combined a powerful missile armament with good seakeeping for a blue water role. The ships were designated Guard Ship (Сторожевой Корабль, SKR) to reflect their substantial greater anti-ship capability than the earlier members of the class and the Soviet strategy of creating protected areas for friendly submarines close to the coast. NATO forces called the vessels 'Krivak II'-class frigates.

Displacing 2,935 tonnes (2,889 long tons; 3,235 short tons) standard and 3,305 t (3,253 long tons; 3,643 short tons) full load, Neukrotimyy was 123 m (403 ft 7 in) long overall, with a beam of 14.2 m (46 ft 7 in) and a draught of 4.5 m (14 ft 9 in). Power was provided by two 22,000-shaft-horsepower (16,000 kW) M7K power sets, each consisting of a combination of a 17,000 shp (13,000 kW) DK59 and a 5,000 shp (3,700 kW) M62 gas turbine arranged in a COGAG installation and driving one fixed-pitch propeller. Design speed was 32 knots (59 km/h; 37 mph) and range 3,900 nautical miles (7,223 km; 4,488 mi) at 14 kn (26 km/h; 16 mph). The ship’s complement was 194, including 23 officers.

=== Armament and sensors ===
Neukrotimyy was designed for anti-submarine warfare around four URPK-5 Rastrub missiles (NATO reporting name SS-N-14 'Silex'), backed up by a pair of quadruple launchers for 533 mm (21 in) torpedoes and a pair of RBU-6000 213 mm (8 in) Smerch-2 anti-submarine rocket launchers. Both the URPK-5 and the torpedoes also had anti-ship capabilities. Defence against aircraft was provided by forty 4K33 OSA-M (SA-N-4 'Gecko') surface to air missiles which were launched from two twin-arm ZIF-122 launchers. Two 100 mm (4 in) AK-100 guns were mounted aft in a superfiring arrangement.

The ship had a well-equipped sensor suite, including a single MR-310A Angara-A air/surface search radar, Don navigation radar, the MP-401S Start-S ESM radar system and the Spectrum-F laser warning system. Fire control for the guns was provided by a MR-143 Lev-214 radar. An extensive sonar complex was fitted, including the bow-mounted MG-332T Titan-2T and the towed-array MG-325 Vega that had a range of up to 15 kilometres (9.3 mi). The vessel was also equipped with the PK-16 decoy-dispenser system which used chaff as a form of missile defense.

== Construction and career ==
Laid down by on 22 January 1976 with the yard number 163 at the Yantar Shipyard in Kaliningrad, Neukrotimyy was launched on 7 September 1977. The ship was the fifth of the class built at the yard. The vessel, named for a Russian word that can be translated as Indomitable, was commissioned on 30 December and joined the Baltic Fleet.

Soon after entering service, Neukrotimyy was sent on missions to foreign missions to promote friendly relationships between the Soviet Union and other nations. Between 5 and 10 June 1978, the vessel visited Rostock in East Germany. In 1982, the vessel travelled to Africa, spending time in Luanda, Angola, between 12 and 18 June and in Lagos, Nigeria, between 25 June and 2 July. In 1985, the ship travelled to Gdynia in Poland with the Project 58 (NATO reporting name Kynda class) cruiser Groznyy to commemorate the end of the Second World War, staying for three days from 5 June before returning to Rostock for four days from 7 October.

In honour of the members of the Young Communist League, or Komsomol, of Lithuania, the ship was renamed Komsomolets Litvyy on 2 November 1987. However, the new name did not last long, reverting back on 27 March 1990. Lithuania had declared independence from the Soviet Union 16 days beforehand. June that year saw Neukrotimyy take another tour of the Baltic Sea, taking in Kiel for three days from 5 June, and Szczecin, Poland, for three days from 21 June. The following year saw the ship travel to the Netherlands, a NATO member, visiting Amsterdam between 2 and 6 September. With the dissolution of the Soviet Union on 26 December 1991, Neukrotimyy was transferred to the Russian Navy. Travels outside the Baltic continued. For example, between 23 and 24 April 1997, the ship could be found at the port of Rotterdam in the Netherlands.

Neukrotimyy continued to serve into the next decade. However, the new century brought a succession of mishaps. 30 July 2005 saw a celebration of the might of the Russian Navy take place in front of the Winter Palace in St Petersburg. Unfortunately, a dummy mine that was to be detonated as part of the spectacle drifted and struck the side of the hull, filling the engine room with water. The swift intervention of the crew saved the ship. Three years later, on 8 December 2008, a fire broke out in the same engine room. Although extinguished, it proved the end for the ship. Neukrotimyy was decommissioned on 29 June 2009. An attempt was made to turn the vessel, the penultimate of the class to be taken out of service, over to a museum, but this failed. Instead the vessel was stored at Baltiysk ready to be broken up but sank in situ on 3 October 2012.
