= Admiral of the fleet (Russia) =

Naval rank of the Russian Federation

Admiral of the fleet Адмирал флота
- Uniform shoulder and sleeve insignia (2013–present)
- Country: Russia
- Service branch: Russian Navy
- Rank group: General officer
- Formation: 1994
- Next higher rank: Marshal of the Russian Federation
- Next lower rank: Admiral
- Equivalent ranks: General of the Army (Ground Forces and Aerospace Forces); 1st class Active State Councillor of the Russian Federation (civilian)

Related articles
- History: Admiral of the fleet (Soviet Union)

Admiral of the fleet or fleet admiral (Russian: Адмирал флота, romanized: Admiral flota) is the highest rank of the Russian Navy. It is the equivalent of the Soviet naval rank of fleet admiral, and is roughly the equivalent to a four-star rank of other nations. In the present day, general of the army is its equivalent in the Russian Ground Forces, Aerospace Forces, Airborne Forces, Strategic Rocket Forces, and Federal Security Service. Marshal of the Russian Federation is the only superior rank in the Russian Armed Forces, and it has no naval equivalent.

== Admirals of the fleet ==
Appointed	Name	Born	Died	Notes	Reference
13 June 1996	Feliks Gromov	1937	2021		
21 February 2000	Vladimir Kuroyedov	1944	2026		
15 December 2006	Vladimir Masorin	1947			
8 December 2025	Aleksandr Moiseyev	1962			
