= Order of Military Merit (Russia) =

State award of the Russian Federation

Order "For Military Merit"
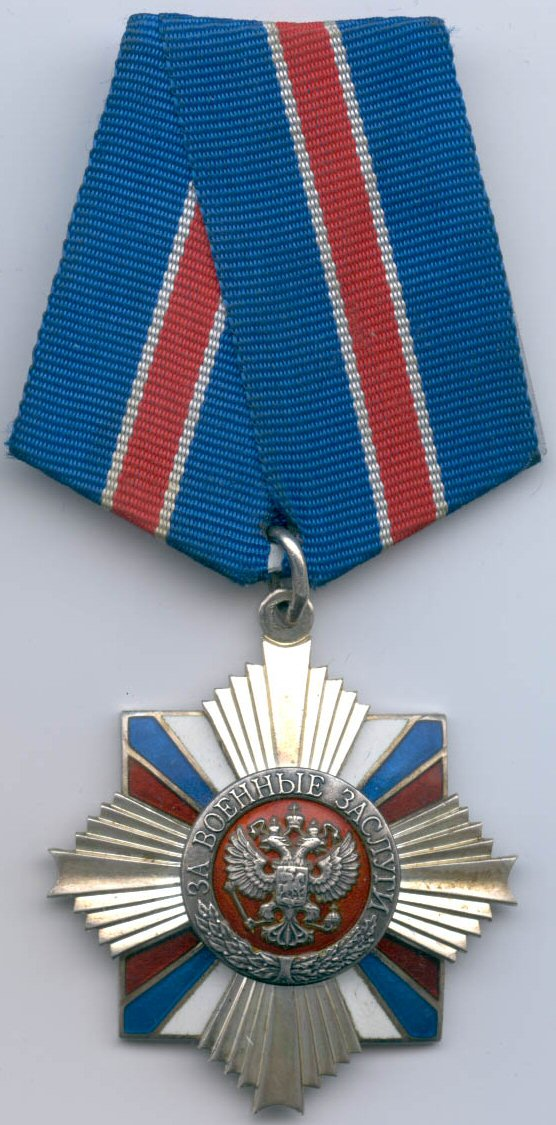
- Order "For Military Merit" (obverse)
- Type: Single grade order
- Awarded for: Distinguished and exemplary military service
- Presented by: Russian Federation
- Eligibility: Citizens of the Russian Federation
- Status: Active
- Established: March 2, 1994
- First award: January 6, 1995
- Ribbon of the Order "For Military Merit"

Precedence
- Next (higher): Order of Courage
- Next (lower): Order "For Naval Merit"

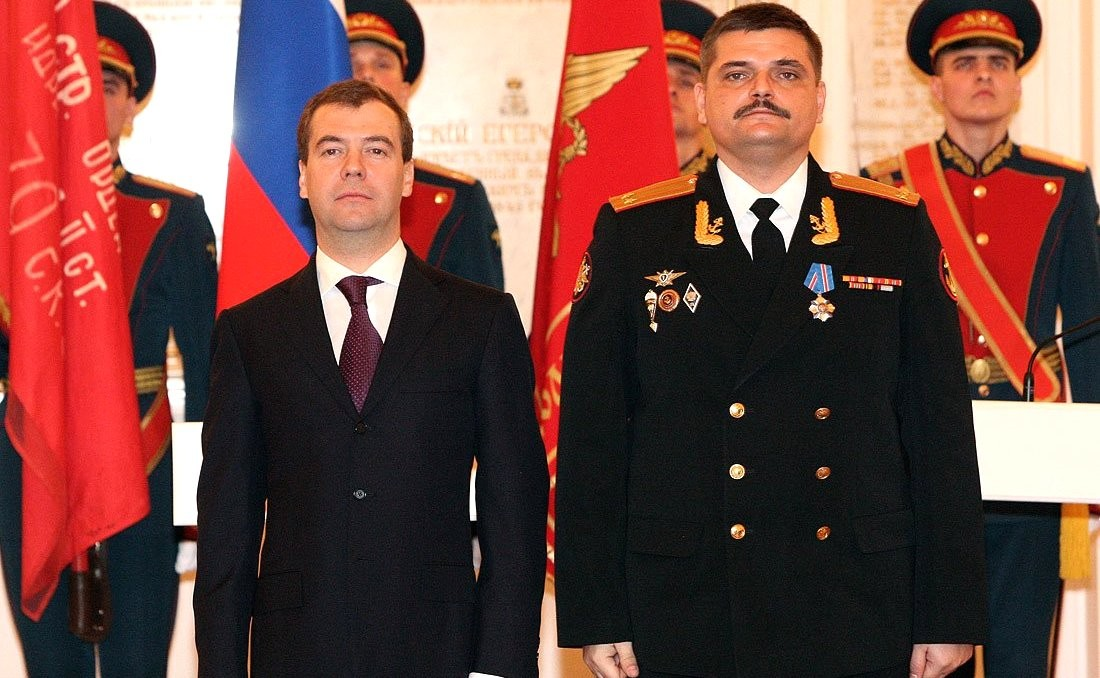
Captain 2nd grade Oleg Kovalev being awarded the Order "For Military Merit" by President Dmitry Medvedev on December 19, 2010. (Photo www.kremlin.ru)

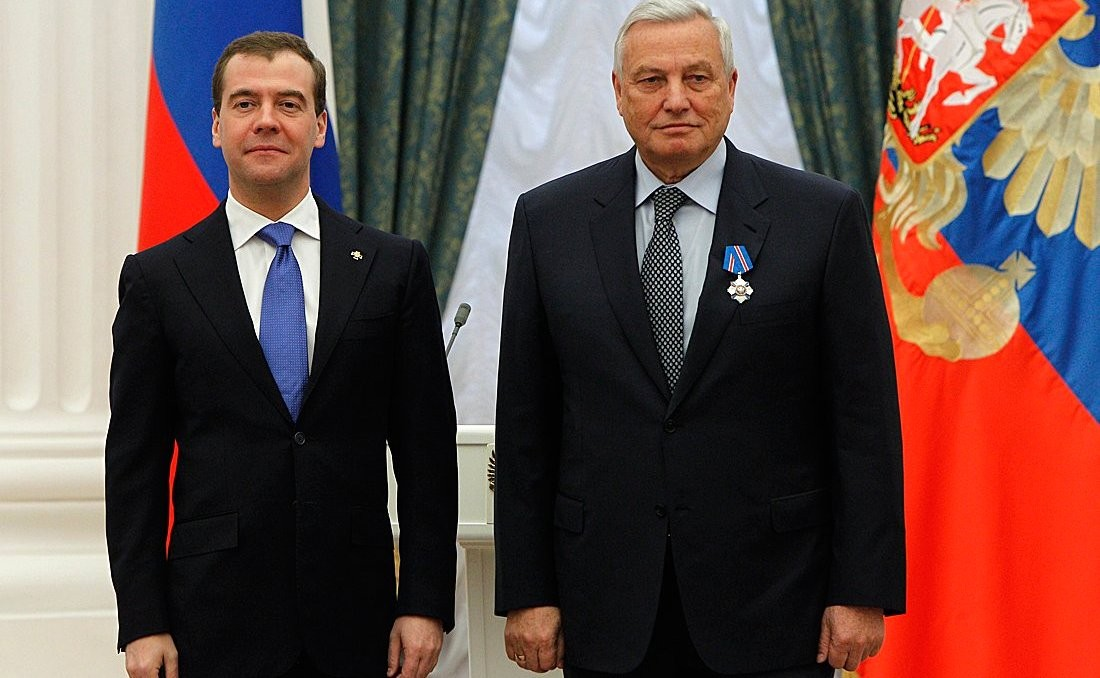
CEO and Chief Designer at Production and Design Association Victor Tyatinkin, just awarded the Order "For Military Merit" by President Dmitry Medvedev on May 3, 2012. (Photo www.kremlin.ru)

The Order "For Military Merit" (Russian: Орден «За военные заслуги») is a military decoration of the Russian Federation established by presidential decree No. 442 of March 2, 1994 to reward military excellence. Its statute was amended three times, first on January 6, 1999, by decree No. 19, then on September 7, 2010, by decree No. 1099 which modernised the entire Russian awards system and finally on December 16, 2011, by Presidential Decree No. 1631.

== History ==
By decree of the Presidium of the Supreme Soviet of the USSR of October 28, 1974, the Order "For Service to the Homeland in the Armed Forces of the USSR" was established. The initiator of the introduction of the new award was the Minister of Defense of the USSR, Marshal of the Soviet Union, Andrei Grechko. The order had three degrees and was intended to reward military personnel of the Soviet Army, Soviet Navy, border guard and internal troops “for successes achieved in combat and political training, maintaining high combat readiness of troops and mastering new military equipment, for high performance in official activities, for the successful completion of special command tasks”, as well as in other cases determined by the statute.

On December 25, 1991, according to the law adopted by the Supreme Soviet of the RSFSR, the RSFSR was renamed the Russian Federation and. On December 26, 1991, the USSR ceased to exist, Russia emerged from it as an independent state. On April 21, 1992, the Congress of People's Deputies of Russia approved the renaming, making appropriate amendments to the Constitution of the RSFSR, which came into force upon publication on May 16, 1992. By Decree of the Presidium of the Supreme Soviet of Russia of March 2, 1992 No. 2424-1, before the adoption of the law on state awards, some insignia that existed in the USSR were retained in the award system of Russia, but the Order "For Service to the Homeland in the Armed Forces of the USSR" was not among them entered

In accordance with presidential decree of 2 March 1994 No. 442 “On State Awards of the Russian Federation” along with other awards, the Order “For Military Merit” was established. Historian, Candidate of Historical Sciences, Associate Professor M.V. Kukel characterizes this order as an analogue of the Order “For Service to the Motherland in the Armed Forces of the USSR” in the Russian award system. Researcher Shchegolev notes that the Order of Military Merit became a new award that had no analogues in the Soviet award system. “At first glance, it looks like the Order "For Service to the Homeland in the Armed Forces of the USSR",” but it certainly is not. According to him "it was given for something else, and it had three degrees, and the idea itself was thought out much more seriously,”. Nevertheless, the place of the Soviet order was supposed to be taken by a new award, but this did not happen; He describes the changes that have occurred as an attempt to “‘combine the incompatible’ and, taking advantage of Western experience, improve the Soviet system”. Researcher from the Institute of Russian History of the Russian Academy of Sciences, L.N. Grekhov, focuses on the fact that the Order “For Military Merit” and the very similar Order “For Naval Merit” look independent against the background of other Russian awards that have Soviet analogues.

The author of the sketch of the Order “For Military Merit” is Merited Artist of the Russian Federation Vyacheslav Vasilyevich Abramov, a graduate of the Stroganov Moscow State Academy of Arts and Industry. E.V. Muravyov acted as the engraver of the order. The badge of the order is made in the tradition of Russian eight-pointed order stars, the diagonal rays of which form pentagons, covered with enamel in the national colors of the Flag of Russia.

== Award statute ==
The Order "For Military Merit" is awarded to military personnel for exemplary performance of military duties, for high combat readiness in ensuring Russia's defence; for high personal performance in career and vocational training, for courage and dedication displayed during the performance of military duties in the course of combat or combat-training objectives; for bravery and courage displayed in the performance of military duties; for merit in strengthening military cooperation with friendly nations.

The intended recipient and the person recommending the award must both have a minimum of 20 years of service.

The Order "For Military Merit" may be awarded to employees of the military–industrial complex of the Russian Federation, of scientific and research organizations or government agencies: for services in design, manufacture and commissioning of modern military equipment and weapons; for personal contributions to national defence policies, development of military science, in strengthening national defence and in promoting interstate military-technical cooperation.

The Order may also be awarded to foreign nationals from among the members of the armed forces of allied foreign countries: for merit in strengthening military cooperation with Russia and organising joint military manoeuvres during military exercises.

The Order "For Military Merit" is worn on the left side of the chest and when in the presence of other Orders and medals of the Russian Federation, is located immediately after the Order of Courage. A rosette in the colours of the ribbon of the Order may be worn on civilian clothing.

== Award description ==
The Order "For Military Merit" is a 40 millimetres (1.6 in) wide silver and enamelled eight pointed star. The four diagonal points of the star being enamelled in the national colours of Russia, white, blue and red. The obverse has a central red enamelled medallion with the silver state emblem of Russia in the center. The medallion is surrounded by a silver band with a relief laurel wreath on the lower half and the relief inscription "FOR MILITARY MERIT" (Russian: «ЗА ВОЕННЫЕ ЗАСЛУГИ») following its outer circumference in the upper half. The otherwise plain reverse bears the award serial number at the bottom.

The Order "For Military Merit" is suspended by a ring through the award's suspension loop to a standard Russian pentagonal mount covered with an overlapping 24 millimetres (0.94 in) wide blue silk moiré ribbon with a 4 millimetres (0.16 in) wide red central stripe bordered by 1 millimetre (0.039 in) wide white stripes.

== Notable recipients (partial list) ==
The individuals below were recipients of the Order "For Military Merit".

- Cosmonaut, Major General Vladimir Vasiliyevich Kovalyonok
- Cosmonaut, Colonel Gennadi Mikhailovich Manakov
- Army General Nikolai Platonovich Patrushev
- Admiral of the Fleet Vladimir Vasilyevich Masorin
- Marshal of the Soviet Union Viktor Georgiyevich Kulikov
- Admiral, former Baltic Fleet commander Vladimir Grigor'evich Yegorov
- Colonel General Gennady Nikolayevich Troshev
- Army General Viktor Germanovich Kazantsev
- Army General Yury Nikolayevich Baluyevsky
- Fleet Admiral Vladimir Ivanovich Kuroyedov
- Fleet Admiral Feliks Nikolayevich Gromov
- Marshal of the Russian Federation Igor Sergeyev
- Army General Alexander Ivanovich Baranov
- Army General Nikolai Dmitrievich Kovalyov
- Army General Alexander Vasilyevich Bortnikov
- Army General Valentin Vladimirovich Korabelnikov
- Admiral Nikolai Mikhailovich Maksimov
- Admiral Aleksandr Mikhailovich Nosatov
- Admiral Vladimir Sergeyevich Vysotskiy
- Army General Vladimir Magomedovich Semyonov
- Colonel General Alexander Nikolayevich Zelin
- Colonel General Anatoliy Alekseevich Nogovitsyn
- Army General Nikolai Yegorovich Makarov
- Colonel Yunus-bek Bamatgireyevich Yevkurov
- Rear Admiral Anatoly Ivanovich Lipinsky
- Rear Admiral Sergei Mikhailovich Pinchuk
- Army General Anatoly Mikhaïlovich Kornukov
- Colonel General Arkady Viktotovich Bakhin

== See also ==
- Awards and decorations of the Russian Federation
- Order of Military Merit (Canada)
- Order of Military Merit (Korea)
- Order of Military Merit (Bulgaria)
- Order of Military Merit (Dominican Republic)
- Order of Military Merit (France)

== Bibliography ==
- Гусев (2014). Ордена, медали и наградные знаки от Петра I до современности. Москва: АСТ. ISBN 978-5-7793-2432-8.
- Изотова; Царёва (2008). Все награды России и СССР. Ордена, медали и нагрудные знаки. Полная энциклопедия орденов и медалей России. Ростов н/Д: Вадис: Москва: РИПОЛ классик. ISBN 978-5-9567-0344-1.
- М. В. Кукель. ""За военные заслуги" орден". 10: 137–138.
- Щеголев, К. А. (2009). Современные награды России. Традиции и преемственность. М.: Вече. ISBN 978-5-9533-3696-3.
- Колесников; Рожков (1986). Ордена и медали СССР (in Russian). Народная асвета.
