= Order "For Service to the Homeland in the Armed Forces of the USSR" =

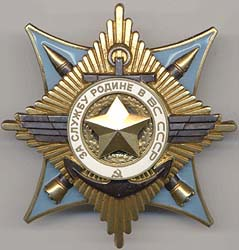
- Order "For Service to the Homeland in the Armed Forces of the USSR", 1st class
- Type: 3 grade order
- Awarded for: Exemplary service in the armed forces, during both war and peacetime
- Presented by: the Soviet Union
- Eligibility: Soviet Army, Navy, Air Force, Border Guard and Interior Troops
- Status: No longer awarded
- Established: October 28, 1974
- First award: July 30, 1976
- Final award: December 19, 1991

Highlights
- Total: 13 first class, 589 second class, 69,567 third class
- Ribbon of the Order "For Service to the Homeland in the Armed Forces of the USSR", 1st class
- Related: Order of Labour Glory (civilian)

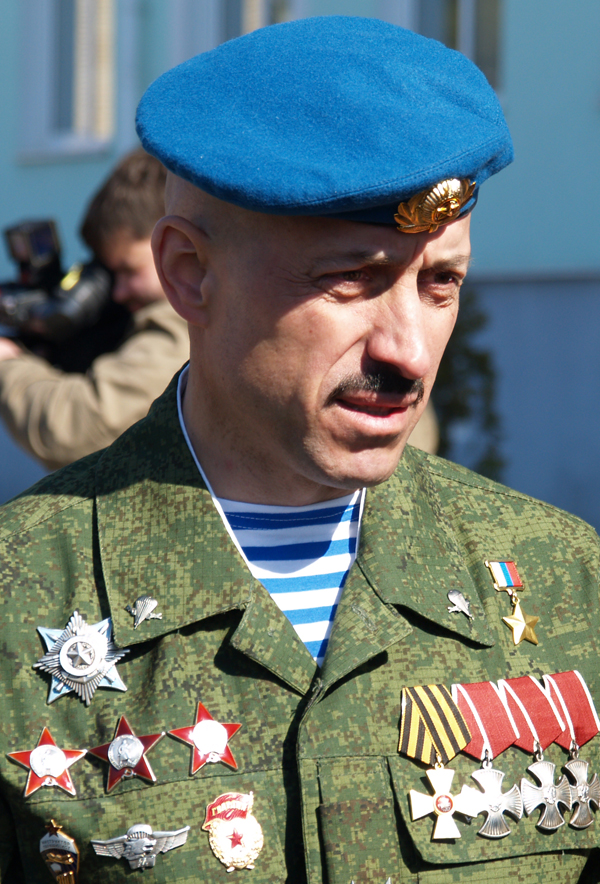
Photograph of Lt Col Anatoly Lebed wearing his 3rd class Order.

The Order "For Service to the Homeland in the Armed Forces of the USSR" (Russian: Орден «За службу Родине в Вооружённых Силах СССР»), also known as the Order "For Service to the Motherland in the Armed Forces of the USSR", was a Soviet military order awarded in three classes for excellence to military personnel.

== Award history ==
The Order "For Service to the Homeland in the Armed Forces of the USSR" was created on October 28, 1974, by decree of the Presidium of the Supreme Soviet of the USSR,

== Award statute ==
The Order "For Service to the Homeland in the Armed Forces of the USSR" was awarded to soldiers of the Soviet Army, Navy, of Border or Internal Troops: for achievements in combat and political training, for maintaining high combat readiness and developing new military equipment; for high performance in service; for the successful fulfillment of special command tasks; for courage and dedication displayed during the performance of military duties; for other services to the nation while serving in the Armed Forces.

The Order "For Service to the Homeland in the Armed Forces of the USSR" was divided into three classes, first, second and third, the first class being the highest. Each class was awarded sequentially from the third to the first.

Recipients of the Order "For Service to the Homeland in the Armed Forces of the USSR" of any class had the right to:

- priority in the choice of living quarters;
- yearly free round trip personal travel by rail (express or passenger trains), by ship (in first class cabins, express or passenger lines), by air or by long-distance road transport;
- free personal use of all types of urban passenger transport in rural areas within the limits of the Republic (except for taxis);
- free vouchers to a sanatorium or rest home (once a year on the recommendation of a medical institution);
- extraordinary availability to community services provided by domestic enterprises, cultural or educational institutions; and,
- a 15% increase in pension.

The Order "For Service to the Homeland in the Armed Forces of the USSR" is worn on the right side of the chest after the Order of the Red Star and in order of class seniority. When worn with Orders of the Russian Federation, the latter have precedence.

== Award description ==
The Order "For Service to the Homeland in the Armed Forces of the USSR" consisted of two 58mm by 58mm four pointed stars crossed at a 90° angle, the top star having the vertical and horizontal points. The rear star was enamelled light blue with gilt edges and two crossed convex oxidised silver rockets pointing towards the upper left and upper right. The rockets' nose cones and tail sections were gilded. The top star was made up of diverging rays, at its center, a circular medallion containing a convex five pointed star within an oak wreath on a blue background, surrounded by a white enamelled ribbon with the inscription: "For Service to the Motherland in the Armed Forces of the USSR" (Russian: «За службу Родине в ВС СССР») on the sides and top, and the image of the hammer and sickle at the bottom. The central medallion was superimposed over an oxidized silver anchor and wings protruding from the top, bottom and both sides. The Order weighed 64,5 grams.

The main differences between the three classes of the Order:

- 1st class - top four pointed star and central five pointed star were gilded;
- 2nd class - top four pointed star was silver and the central five pointed star was gilded;
- 3rd class - top four pointed star and central five pointed star were silver.

The ribbons to be worn on the uniform in the ribbon bar when the Order wasn't worn were:

- 1st class - blue with a 6mm wide yellow central stripe;
- 2nd class - blue with two 3mm wide yellow central stripes 1mm apart;
- 3rd class - blue with three 2mm wide yellow central stripes 1mm apart.

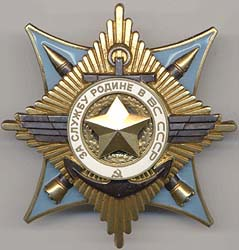
1st class

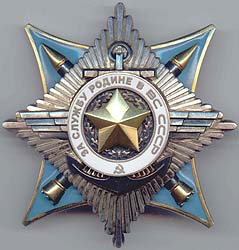
2nd class

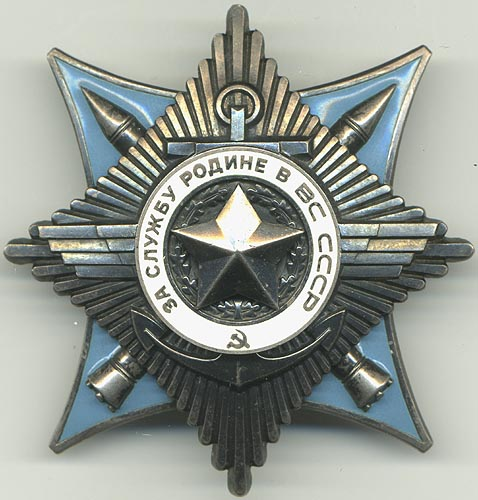
3rd class

Ribbon

== Recipients ==
The first investiture of the Order "For Service to the Homeland in the Armed Forces of the USSR" 3rd class took place on February 17, 1975, the first orders 2nd class were awarded on July 30, 1976, and the first awards 1st class in 1982. From 1975 to the disestablishment of the order following the 1991 dissolution of the Soviet Union, 69,576 orders 3rd class, 589 2nd class and only 13 1st class (Full Cavaliers) were awarded. Below are (incomplete) lists of the recipients:

=== Full cavaliers (complete list) ===
- Major General Vasily Shcherbakov (11 February 1982)
- Lieutenant General Ivan Kolodyazhny (11 February 1982)
- Colonel General Ivan Zavyalov (16 February 1982)
- Captain 1st class Vasily Poroshin (16 February 1982)
- Colonel Gennady Loshkarev (17 May 1982)
- Lieutenant General Albert Bobrovsky (27 December 1982)
- Captain 1st grade Aleksandr Kazakov (27 December 1982)
- Colonel Yuri Orlov (27 December 1982)
- Colonel General Georgy Baydukov (25 May 1987)
- Major General of Internal Troops Aleksandr Verevkin (1 March 1989)
- Admiral Valery Sergeyev (5 May 1989)
- Colonel Boris Agapov (24 May 1989)
- Colonel General Vladislav Achalov (22 February 1990)

=== Cavaliers of the 2nd and 3rd classes (partial list) ===
- Army General Igor Nikolayevich Rodionov
- Lieutenant General Anatoliy Grigoryevich Funtikov
- Admiral Vladimir Grigoryevich Yegorov
- Admiral of the Fleet Feliks Nikolayevich Gromov
- Marshal of Aviation Yevgeniy Yakovlevich Savitskiy
- Army General Viktor Petrovich Dubynin
- Former Colonel and 3rd President of the Chechen Republic of Ichkeria Aslan (Khalid) Aliyevich Maskhadov
- Lieutenant General and politician Alexander Ivanovich Lebed

=== Cavaliers of the 3rd class (partial list) ===
- Valery Mikhailovich Sablin
- Army General Nikolay Yegorovich Makarov
- Lieutenant Colonel Anatoly Vyacheslavovich Lebed
- Lieutenant General Vladimir Anatolyevich Shamanov
- Marshal of the Soviet Union Sergei Leonidovich Sokolov
- Marshal of Aviation Alexander Ivanovich Pokryshkin
- Marshal of the Soviet Union Ivan Ignatyevich Yakubovsky
- Marshal of the Soviet Union Sergey Fyodorovich Akhromeyev
- Admiral of the Fleet Vladimir Vasilyevich Masorin
- Colonel General Gennady Nikolayevich Troshev
- Army General Anatoly Vasiliyevich Kvashnin
- Cosmonaut Major General Andriyan Grigoryevich Nikolayev
- Cosmonaut Major General Alexey Arkhipovich Leonov
- Cosmonaut Lieutenant General Georgy Timofeyevich Beregovoy
- Cosmonaut Major General Vladimir Aleksandrovich Shatalov
- Cosmonaut Colonel Boris Valentinovich Volynov
- Cosmonaut Colonel General Pyotr Ilyich Klimuk
- Lieutenant General and Military Conductor Valery Mikhaylovich Khalilov
- Cosmonaut Major General Vladimir Aleksandrovich Dzhanibekov
- Cosmonaut Major General Vladimir Vasiliyevich Kovalyonok
- Test Cosmonaut Colonel Viktor Mikhailovich Afanasyev
- Marshal of the Soviet Union Aleksandr Mikhaylovich Vasilevsky
- Cosmonaut Colonel Anatoly Nikolayevich Berezovoy
- Cosmonaut Colonel Valery Ilyich Rozhdestvensky
- Marshal of the Soviet Union Kirill Semyonovich Moskalenko
- Lieutenant General and politician Ruslan Sultanovich Aushev
- Captain 3rd Rank Valery Mikhailovich Sablin
- Admiral of the Fleet of the Soviet Union Sergey Georgiyevich Gorshkov
- Hero of Belarus Uładzimir Mikałajevič Karvat
- Marshal of the Soviet Union Viktor Georgiyevich Kulikov

== See also ==
- Category:Recipients of the Order "For Service to the Homeland in the Armed Forces of the USSR", 1st class
- Category:Recipients of the Order "For Service to the Homeland in the Armed Forces of the USSR", 2nd class
- Category:Recipients of the Order "For Service to the Homeland in the Armed Forces of the USSR", 3rd class
