= Baltic Fleet =

Russian Navy fleet

- Балтийский флот, Baltiyskiy flot
- Baltic Fleet great emblem
- Active: 18 May 1703 – present
- Branch: Russian Navy
- Role: Naval warfare Amphibious warfare Combat patrols in the Baltic; Naval presence/diplomacy missions in the Atlantic and elsewhere
- Size: See list: c. 75+ total vessels; 2 diesel/electric submarines (SSKs) permanently assigned + others temporarily tasked from other fleets; c. 30 major and minor surface combatants (destroyer?, frigates, corvettes) + others temporarily tasked from other fleets; 4 major amphibious ships (of which 3 involved in the Russo-Ukraine War & operating in the Black Sea; at least one heavily damaged; 2 large air cushion landing craft - LCAC); c. 25 patrol vessels & mine warfare vessels; Support ships/auxiliaries
- Part of: Russian Armed Forces; Leningrad Military District (2024–)
- Garrison/HQ: Kaliningrad (HQ); Baltiysk; Kronstadt
- Anniversaries: 18 May
- Engagements: See list: Great Northern War; Battle of Stäket; Battle of Gangut; Battle of Grengam; Seven Years' War; Pomeranian War; Russo-Turkish wars; Battle of Chesma; Battle of the Dardanelles; Battle of Athos; Russo-Swedish War (1788–1790); Battle of Hogland; Battle of Reval; Battle of Vyborg Bay; Battle of Svensksund; Crimean War; Russo-Japanese War; Battle of Tsushima; World War I; Battle of Åland Islands; Battle of the Gulf of Riga; Russian Civil War; World War II; Winter War; Siege of Leningrad; Cold War; Russo-Ukrainian War; Raid on Tendra Spit
- Decorations: Order of the Red Banner (2)

Commanders
- Current commander: Vice Admiral Sergei Lipilin
- Notable commanders: See list: Alexei Orlov; Adm. Korneli Cruys; Adm. Dmitry Senyavin; Adm. Vasily Chichagov; Adm. Samuel Greig; Vice Adm. Adrian Nepenin; Rear Adm. Aleksandr Razvozov; Cpt. Alexey Schastny; Adm. Arseniy Golovko; Vice Adm. Alexander Vekman; Adm. Lev Galler; Fleet Adm. Ivan Isakov; Adm. Vladimir Yegorov; Adm. Ivan Kapitanets; Adm. Konstantin Makarov; Adm. Viktor Chirkov; Adm. Matija Zmajević

External videos
- on RT Documentary Official YouTube Channel(in English)
- The Baltic Fleet (E01): Russian stealth corvette and 'black hole' submarine get ready for a face-off on YouTube
- The Baltic Fleet (E02): Loading torpedoes on the 'Magnitogorsk' submarine on YouTube
- The Baltic Fleet (E03): The challenging task of repainting the whole warship on YouTube
- The Baltic Fleet (E04): 'Magnitogorsk' submarine begins its dive on YouTube

The Baltic Fleet (Russian: Балтийский флот, romanized: Baltiyskiy flot) is the fleet of the Russian Navy in the Baltic Sea.

Established 18 May 1703, under Tsar Peter the Great as part of the Imperial Russian Navy, the Baltic Fleet is the oldest Russian fleet. In 1918, the fleet was inherited by the Russian SFSR which then founded the Soviet Union in 1922, where it was eventually known as the Twice Red Banner Baltic Fleet as part of the Soviet Navy, as during this period it gained the two awards of the Order of the Red Banner. Following the collapse of the Soviet Union in 1991, the Baltic Fleet was inherited by the Russian Federation and reverted to its original name as part of the Russian Navy.

The Baltic Fleet is headquartered in Kaliningrad and its main base is in Baltiysk (Pillau), both in Kaliningrad Oblast, while another base is in Kronstadt, Saint Petersburg, in the Gulf of Finland.

== Imperial Russia ==
=== Formation and Great Northern War ===
The Imperial Russian Baltic Fleet was created during the Great Northern War (1700–21) at the initiative of Tsar Peter the Great, who ordered the first ships for the Baltic Fleet to be constructed at Lodeynoye Pole in 1702 and 1703. Given a Swedish advantage in the Baltic in larger conventional warships, the stress on the Russian side was placed on large numbers of smaller vessels which could overwhelm enemy squadrons by sheer weight of numbers. Peter ordered the construction of such vessels, propelled by oars and a single sail, on Lake Ladoga, Europe's largest lake, where Sweden maintained a naval squadron of brigantines and galleys. Russia's domination of Lake Ladoga contributed to the subsequent Russian victory at the Siege of Nöteborg (1702).

The first commander was a recruited Dutch admiral, Cornelius Cruys, who in 1723 was succeeded by Count Fyodor Apraksin. In 1703, the main base of the fleet was established in Kronshtadt.

In 1701 Peter the Great established a special school, the School of Mathematics and Navigation (Russian: Школа математических и навигацких наук), situated in the Sukharev Tower in Moscow. As the territory to the west around the Gulf of Finland was acquired by Russia for a "warm-water" port giving access for its merchantmen and the buildup of a naval force, the city of Saint Petersburg was built and developed an extensive port. The School of Mathematics and Navigation was moved to St. Petersburg and in 1752 it was renamed the Naval Cadet Corps. Today it is the Saint Petersburg Naval Institute – Peter the Great Naval Corps.

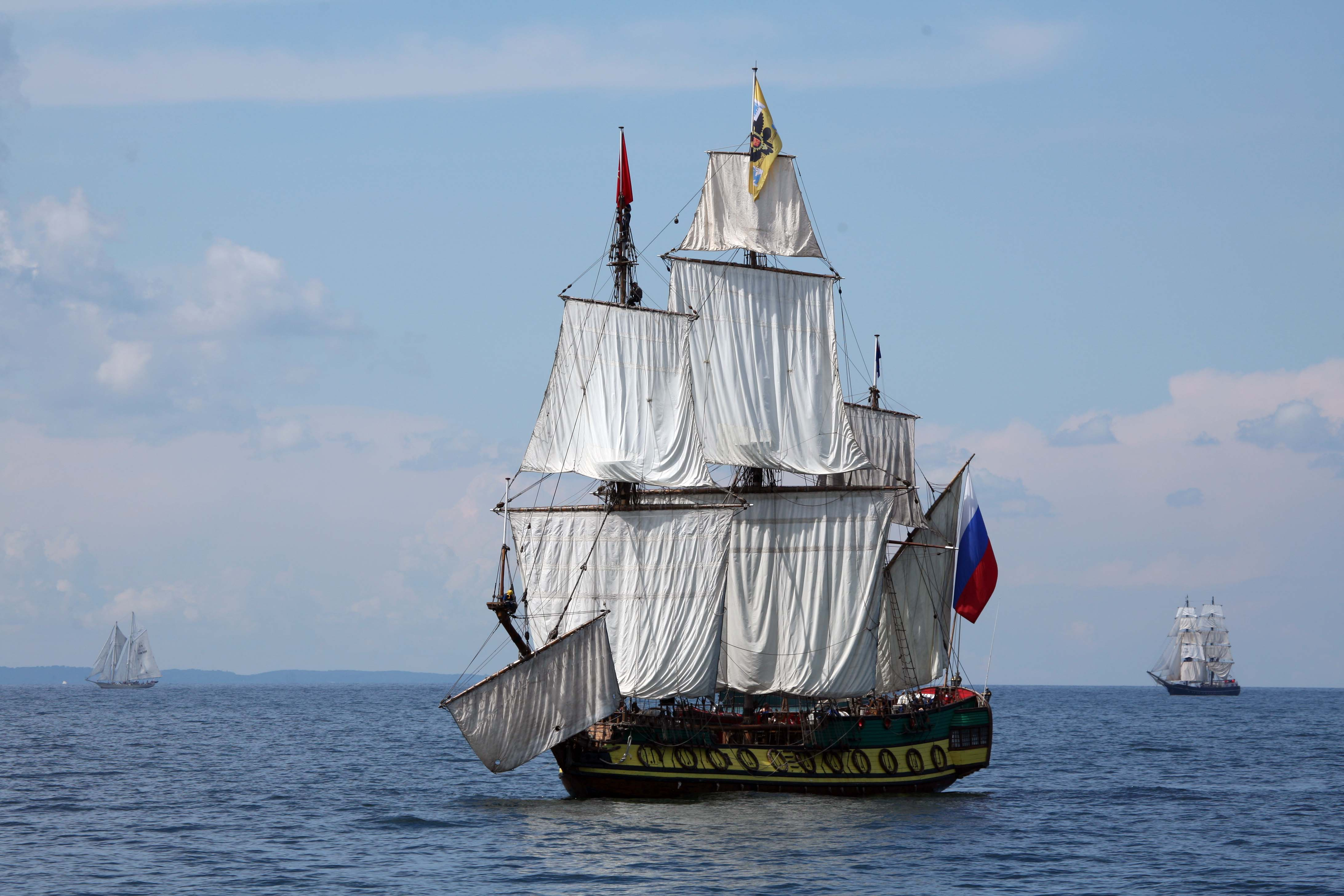
A modern replica of the fleet's first vessel, the 24-gun three-masted frigate Shtandart

The Baltic Fleet began to receive new vessels in 1703. The fleet's first vessel was the 24-gun three-masted frigate Shtandart. She was the fleet's flagship, and is a prime example of the increasing role of the frigate design.

By 1725, the fleet boasted some 30,000 sailors and 800 vessels of all types, including galleys.

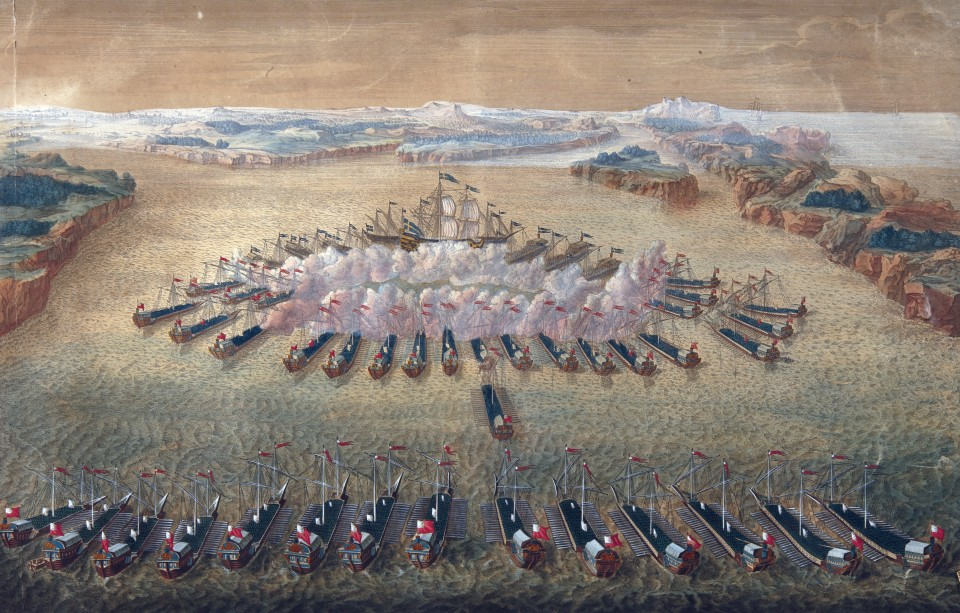
The Battle of Gangut

During the Great Northern War, the Baltic Fleet assisted in taking Viborg, Tallinn, (Estonia), Riga, (Latvia), the West Estonian archipelago (Moonsund archipelago), Helsinki, (Finland), and Turku. The Russian Navy won an important victory over the Swedes at the Battle of Gangut (Swedish: Hangöudd) in 1714. The victory ushered in Russian naval superiority over the Swedes in the Baltic for the remainder of the war. Another less decisive engagement took place at Grengam (Swedish: Ledsund) in 1720. From 1715, the British Royal Navy intervened in the Baltic Sea on behalf of the German principality of Hanover, (dynastic home of the current British monarchy) and more or less in a tacit alliance with Russia.

During the concluding stages of the war, the Russian fleet would land troops along the Swedish coast to devastate coastal settlements. However, after the death of King Charles XII, the Royal Navy would rather protect Swedish interests after a rapprochement between the Kingdom of Sweden and King George I. A Russian attempt to reach the Swedish capital of Stockholm was checked at the Battle of Stäket in 1719. The losses suffered by the Russian Navy at the Grengam in 1720, as well as the arrival of a Royal Navy squadron under Admiral John Norris in 1715, also prevented further operations of any greater scale before the war ended in 1721.

=== War of the Polish Succession ===
In 1734, during the War of the Polish Succession, the Baltic fleet (which included the 100-gun first-rate ship Peter I & II and the 32-gun frigates Russia and Mitau) under Thomas Gordon proved instrumental in deciding the Siege of Danzig in Russia's favor. Although the Mitau was captured by the French Navy, French intervention in the war failed to prevent the fall of the city to the Russians. The French lost the frigate Brilliant and the Russians were successful in ensuring that their claimant, August III, ascended to the Polish throne.

=== Seven Years War ===
During the "Seven Years' War", (1756–1763), the Russian Baltic Sea fleet was active on the Pomeranian coast of northern Germany and Prussia, helping the infantry to take Memel in 1757 and Kolberg in 1761. The Øresund was blockaded in order to prevent the British Navy from entering the Baltic sea. However, Russia's hard won gains were surrendered when the Empress Elizabeth died and her successor, Peter III, made peace with Prussia in 1762 and withdrew Russia from the war.

=== Late 18th/19th century operations and entry into the Mediterranean ===
During the Russo-Turkish War of 1768-1774, the fleet sailed into the Mediterranean Sea on a six-month voyage and destroyed the Ottoman Navy at the Battle of Chesma in 1770. While the Russians attempted to foment and support a revolt against the Ottomans in Greece, the Russian fleet was unable to provide sufficient land forces in support and the revolt was crushed.

During the Russo-Swedish War (1788–1790) the fleet, commanded by Samuel Greig and Vasily Chichagov, checked the Swedes at Hogland (1788), Reval, and Viborg (1790). An impetuous Russian attack on the Swedish galley flotilla on 9 July 1790 at the Second Battle of Svensksund resulted in a disaster for the Russian Navy who lost some 9,500 out of 14,000 men and about one third of their flotilla. The Russian defeat in this battle effectively ended the war.

Turkey, encouraged by the French, went to war with Russia in the Russo-Turkish War of 1806–1812. The Russian fleet deploying from the Baltic but joining some vessels of the Black Sea Fleet already in the Mediterranean prior to the outbreak of war, under the command of Admiral Dmitry Senyavin played an instrumental role in this conflict securing victories at both the Battle of the Dardanelles (1807) and the Battle of Athos.

During the French invasion of Russia, the fleet assisted in sustaining Russian forces in the city of Riga during its siege by French and Prussian forces from July to December 1812. After the conclusion of the Napoleonic Wars, the Russians, together with the British and French, intervened in the Greek War of Independence defeating the Turkish fleet at the Battle of Navarino in 1827 and helping to secure Greek independence (though once again, the Russian fleet was compelled to deploy from the Baltic). Turkish closure of the Dardanelles Straits then sparked a renewed Russo-Turkish conflict from 1828 to 1829 which led to the Russians gaining further territory along the eastern Black Sea.

At about the same time, Russian Admiral Ivan Krusenstern circumnavigated the globe, while another Baltic Fleet officer – Fabian Gottlieb von Bellingshausen – discovered the southern ice-covered continent, Antarctica.

In the Crimean War, (1853–1856), the fleet – although stymied in its operations by the absence of steamships – prevented the British and French Allies from occupying Hangö, Sveaborg, and Saint Petersburg. Despite being greatly outnumbered by the technologically superior Allies, it was the Russian Fleet that introduced into naval warfare such novelties as torpedo mines, invented by Boris Yakobi. Other outstanding inventors who served in the Baltic Fleet were Alexander Stepanovich Popov (who was the first to demonstrate the practical application of electromagnetic (radio) waves), Stepan Makarov (the first to launch torpedoes from a boat), Alexei Krylov (author of the modern ship floodability theory), and Alexander Mozhaiski (co-inventor of aircraft). However, the Royal Navy's successful blockade of Russian ports in the Baltic had a significant impact on Russia's wartime economy and tied down Russian ground and naval forces that might otherwise have been deployed in Crimea, in order to defend the Baltic coast.

=== Age of iron ===
During the American Civil War, Anglo-Russian relations were worsened by Russian perceptions that the British were covertly supporting the January Uprising against Russian rule in Poland. The Russian admiralty feared that its navy could be blockaded by the British and French navies in the case of an outbreak of war, and thus dispatched the Atlantic and Pacific fleets to North America, including San Francisco and from 1863 New York—with sealed orders to attack British naval targets in case war broke out between Russia and Britain. Other analysis suggests that the deployment may have been motivated by a desire to secure shelter for the vessels in case of renewal of conflict with Britain and France.

In 1869, the fleet commissioned the first turret on a battleship in the world – Petr Veliky. In the second half of the 19th and early 20th Century the Russian navy placed considerable emphasis on developing its mine warfare capabilities and a strong network of coastal artillery batteries was created to cover the approaches to St. Petersburg, Riga, and other important bases.

=== Russo-Japanese War ===
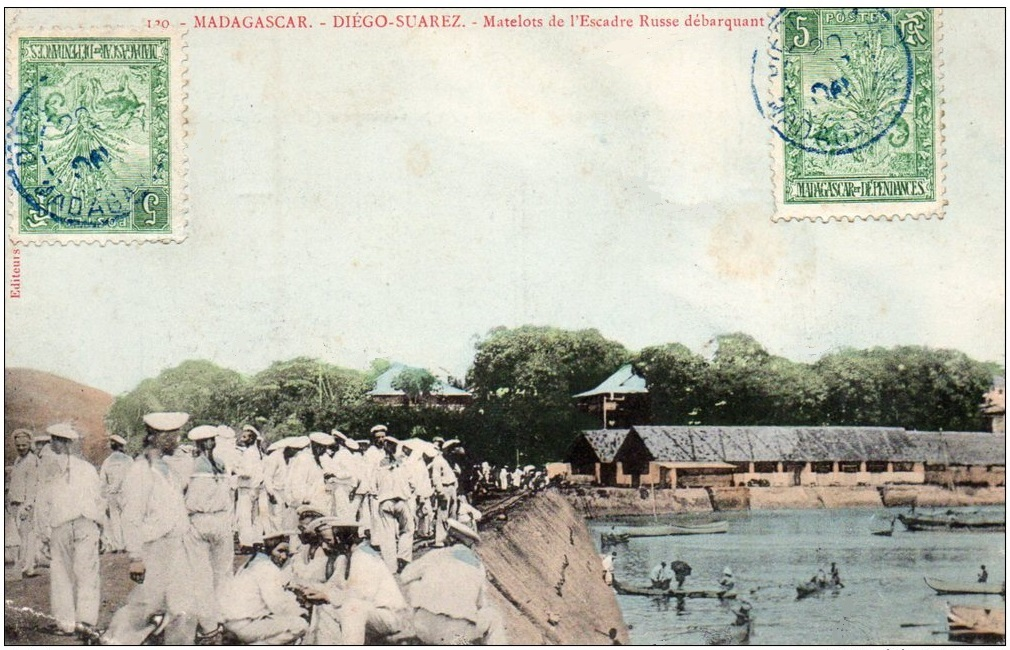
Sailors of the Baltic Fleet ashore at Nossi Bé, December 1904

By 1904 with the onset of the Russo-Japanese War, decades of modernization had nominally made the Russian Navy the fourth strongest in the world, after the UK, France and Germany and supposedly ahead of the US and Japan. However, as subsequent events would demonstrate, the navy's strength on paper would prove to be superficial.

After the failed breakout attempts of Russia's naval forces in the Pacific, in the battles of the Yellow Sea and Ulsan in August 1904, the Baltic Fleet (reorganized into the "Second Pacific Squadron") under the command of Admiral Zinovy Rozhestvensky was sent on a prolonged voyage around the Cape of Good Hope lasting seven months. The aim was to combine the Baltic Fleet with Russia's Pacific Fleet against the Japanese. The Imperial German civilian passenger Hamburg-Amerika Line provided 60 colliers to supply the Baltic Fleet on its journey. The fleet stopped in French, German and Portuguese colonial ports: Tangier in Morocco, Dakar in Senegal, Gabon, Baía dos Tigres, Lüderitz Bay, and Nossi Be (Madagascar). Then, united with a "Third Pacific Squadron" consisting of old ships under the command of Admiral Nebogatov that had been sent via Suez to further reinforce Rozhestvensky's force, they formed a single fleet under Rozhestvensky which sailed via French Indochina to its doomed encounter with the Japanese fleet at the Battle of Tsushima in May, 1905.

During its passage through the North Sea the fleet nearly embroiled Russia in a broader war with the United Kingdom when it mistook a fleet of British fishing boats for Japanese torpedo boats and opened fire, killing three sailors in what is known as the Dogger Bank incident. While a Russian apology and agreement to a joint investigation (leading to a later payment of compensation by Russia) avoided war, the incident underscored the inherent vulnerability of the fleet's prolonged voyage.

The decision to send the fleet to the Pacific was made after Russia had suffered a string of naval defeats in East Asia. The subsequent one-sided outcome of the Tsushima naval battle broke Russian strength. The Baltic Fleet lost 21 ships sunk and 7 ships captured (including all 11 battleships), with 6 ships interned in neutral ports. 5,045 Russians were dead, 803 injured and 6,016 captured. Japanese losses were only 117 sailors killed and three torpedo boats sunk. The scope of the disaster forced Russia to sue for peace and set the stage for an internal Russian uprising in the Revolution of 1905.

=== World War I ===
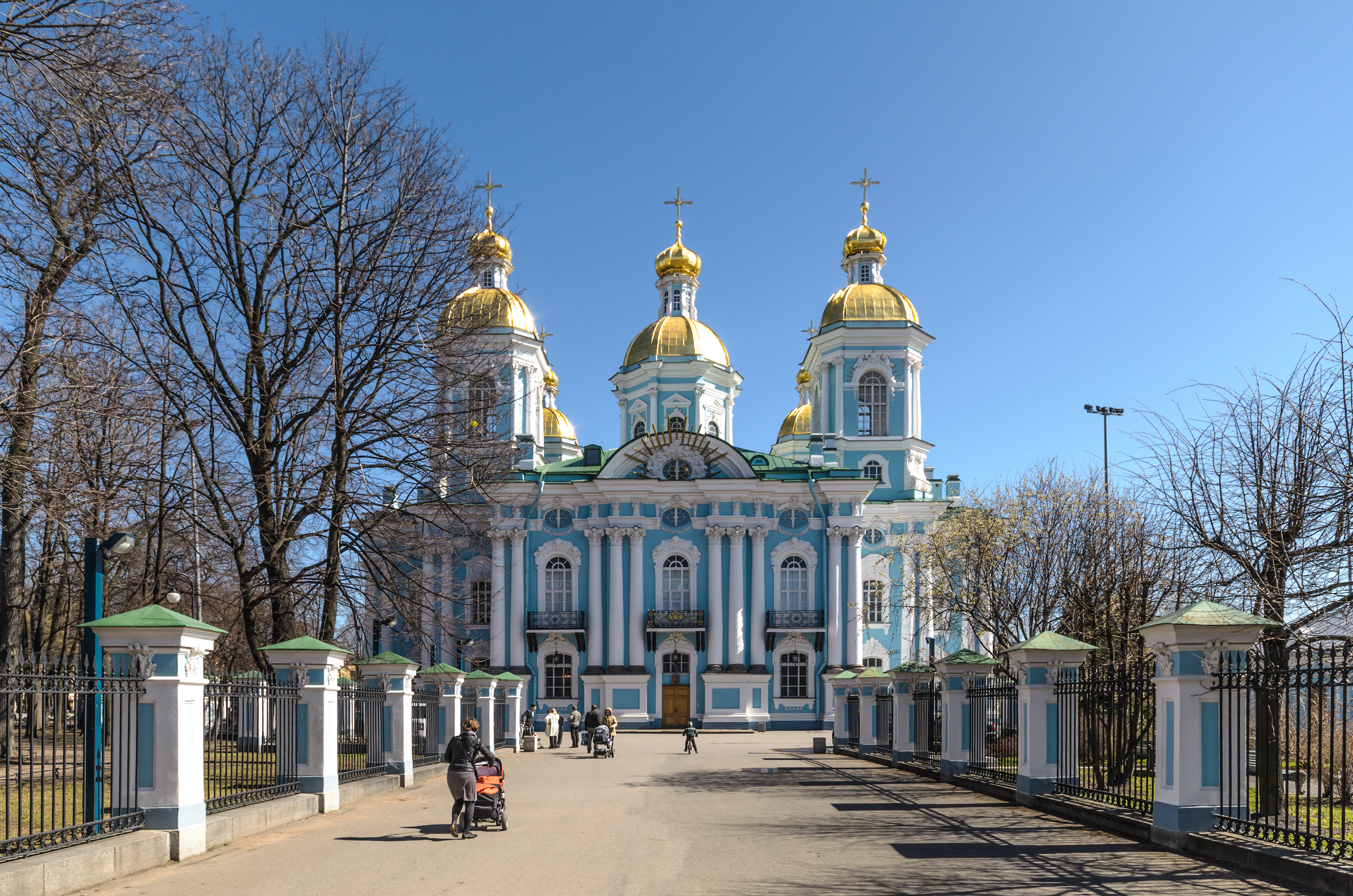
The naval St. Nicholas Cathedral in St. Petersburg is the main church of the Russian Navy. Its outside is covered with plaques to Russian sailors/officers lost at sea.

Following the catastrophic losses in battleships during the Russo-Japanese War, Russia embarked on a new naval building program which was to incorporate a number of the most modern dreadnought-type battleships into the fleet along with other vessels and practices adopted from the Western navies. In late 1914, four dreadnoughts of the Gangut class entered service with the fleet: Gangut; Poltava; Petropavlovsk; and Sevastopol. Four more powerful battlecruisers of the Borodino class were under construction, but were never completed.

At the start of the war in 1914, the Baltic Fleet consisted of five pre-dreadnoughts (plus four dreadnoughts being completed), six older armoured cruisers, four light (protected) cruisers and some destroyers, torpedo boats and a few small submarines. The Imperial German Navy, on the other hand, deployed 15 dreadnoughts, five battlecruisers and other modern ships. While these vessels were focused on the threat posed by the Royal Navy in the North Sea, the Germans had the ability to transfer vessels between the North Sea and the Baltic via the Kiel Canal, giving them naval superiority. While the Russian navy was generally weaker than its German opponent, Russian coastal fortifications and the use of sea mines were to play a major role in containing German offensive operations.

The Imperial Russian Navy's Baltic Fleet included a submarine division that had about 30 submarines of several classes and various auxiliary vessels, the largest of which were the transport and mother ships Europa, Tosno, Khabarovsk, Oland and Svjatitel Nikolai. Some of the fleet's 355-ton submarines were made by Electric Boat Company of Groton, Connecticut in the United States, main supplier and builder of subs for the U.S. Navy. Five of these "AG (Holland)" class submarines were prefabricated by the British Pacific Engineering & Construction Company at Barnet (near Vancouver), in Canada's British Columbia, also under contract to the Electric Boat Company. These Canadian-built subs were shipped to Russia, a fellow Ally in the First World War in December 1915. Four of these submarines, AG 11, AG 12, AG 15 and AG 16 were scuttled in the harbour of Hanko on 3 April 1918, just before the 10,000-strong Imperial German Baltic Sea Division landed in support of the White Guard in the Finnish Civil War. During the war the fleet was aided by a detachment of British Royal Navy submarines. These subs were later scuttled by their crews near the Harmaja Lighthouse outside Helsinki, Finland, on 4 April 1918.

The Russians were able to score a major success early in the war when the German light cruiser SMS Magdeburg ran aground on the island of Oldensholm off the Estonian coast on 25 August 1914. She had been conducting a sweep with other ships in the Gulf of Finland. Two Russian cruisers opened fire on the stranded ship, which was badly damaged and had to be abandoned by the Germans. Subsequently, Russian divers were able to recover German naval and merchant code books then in use, which also revealed the methods employed for constructing future codes. These were sent to British Admiralty cryptographers in London which allowed the British to decipher almost all of the German wireless traffic for the remainder of the war.

In August 1915, the German Navy transferred several units of the High Seas Fleet to the Baltic with the objective of destroying Russian naval forces in the Baltic and facilitating the capture of Riga from the Russians. In the ensuing Battle of the Gulf of Riga Russian naval units, including the Battleship Slava and supporting British E-class submarines, repelled the German attack.

The German Navy ultimately secured supremacy in the Baltic in the turmoil of the 1917 Revolutions in Russia. In October 1917, in Operation Albion, German naval forces were able to clear mines and neutralize Russian coastal artillery in the West Estonian Archipelago, thereby allowing German amphibious units to land and capture the islands.

== Soviet era ==
=== October Revolution and Russian Civil War (1917–22) ===
During the October Revolution the sailors of the Baltic Fleet (renamed "Naval Forces of the Baltic Sea" in March 1918) were among the most ardent supporters of Bolsheviks, and formed an elite among Red military forces. The fleet was forced to evacuate several of its bases after Russia's withdrawal from the First World War, under the terms of the Treaty of Brest-Litovsk. The "Ice Cruise" of the Baltic Fleet (1918), led by Alexey Schastny who was later executed on Trotsky's orders, saw the evacuation of most of the fleet's ships to Kronstadt and Petrograd.

Some ships of the fleet took part in the Russian Civil War, notably by clashing with the British navy operating in the Baltic as part of intervention forces. The Royal Navy deployed 10 fast Coastal Motor Boats (CMBs), an aircraft carrier (converted from the cruiser HMS Vindictive), and HMS Erebus a monitor with 15-inch guns. Twenty British submarines operated as part of this fleet. In August 1919, the British launched an attack against Kronstadt and successfully torpedoed two Soviet battleships and the submarine depot ship Pamyat Azova. This attack rendered the Soviet Navy incapable of interfering seriously with land operations by anti-Soviet forces and assisted in securing independence for Estonia and the other Baltic states in the immediate aftermath of the revolution in Russia.

Over the years, however, the relations of the Baltic Fleet sailors with the Bolshevik regime soured, and they eventually rebelled against the Soviet government in the Kronstadt rebellion in 1921, but were suppressed and executed, and the fleet de facto ceased to exist as an active military unit.

=== 1922–1941 ===
The fleet, renamed the Red-Banner Baltic Fleet on 11 January 1935, was developed further during the Soviet years, initially relying on pre-revolutionary warships, but adding modern units built in Soviet yards from the 1930s onwards. Among the fleet's Soviet commanders were Gordey Levchenko in 1938–39 and Arseniy Golovko in 1952–56. Ships and submarines commissioned to the fleet included Soviet submarine M-256, a Project 615 short-range attack diesel submarine of the Soviet Navy. The fleet also acquired a large number of ground-based aircraft to form a strong naval aviation force.

In September 1939, the fleet threatened the Baltic states as part of a series of military actions staged to encourage the Baltics to accept Soviet offers of "mutual assistance." Subsequently, in June 1940, the fleet blockaded the Baltics in support of the Soviet invasion.

Like all elements in Soviet society, the navy was decimated by the Stalin purges of the 1930s. At least 30 percent of the Soviet Army and Navy officer corps, including three of the four fleet commanders, were arrested and shot or sent to the gulags. One former commander of the Baltic Fleet, Admiral Mikhail Viktorov, was shot and another commander, Admiral Lev Galler, was imprisoned after World War II and died in custody. The purges are said to have "had a catastrophic effect on the Red Army's ability to perform in the early stages of World War II".

==== Winter War ====
Finland, which had refused to sign a "pact of mutual assistance", was attacked by the USSR. The fleet played a limited role in the Winter War with Finland in 1939–1940, mostly through conducting artillery bombardments of Finnish coastal fortifications. Many fleet aircraft were involved in operations against Finland, however. However, the Baltic Fleet's planned operations in 1939 to seize the islands of Suursaari, Lavansaari, Tytärsaari and Seiskari, and to destroy Finnish coastal fortifications, were stymied by Finnish resistance. In 1940, the fleet played a supporting role in the reinvigorated and broader Soviet offensive. Subsequently, the Baltic Fleet also supported the Soviet invasion of the Baltic states in the summer of 1940.

=== World War II ===
In the beginning of the German invasion the Baltic Fleet had 2 battleships (both of World War I vintage), 2 cruisers, 28 destroyers, 71 submarines, as well as other ships and 656 aircraft. During the war, the fleet, commanded by the Vice-Admiral Vladimir Tributz, defended the Hanko Peninsula, Tallinn, several islands in Estonian SSR, and participated in the breakthrough breach of the Siege of Leningrad. 137 sailors of the Baltic Fleet were awarded a title of the Hero of the Soviet Union.

For most of the war the fleet was trapped by German and Finnish minefields in Leningrad and nearby Kronstadt, the only bases left in Soviet hands on the Baltic coast. Another key factor was that the Finns had recaptured outer islands of the Gulf of Finland, Suursaari being the most important of them. Many of the fleet sailors fought on land as infantry during the siege. However, the fleet was able to carry out the Soviet evacuation of Tallinn in late August 1941.

The fleet was very vulnerable to attacks by the Luftwaffe, particularly as German forces advanced toward Leningrad in the summer of 1941. As ships were destroyed or immobilized, by early 1942 many sailors of the Baltic Fleet were transferred to the infantry to make up for ground forces shortages. Even as late as 1944–1945, the German Navy still enjoyed superiority at sea in the Baltic. Nevertheless, by January 1944 the navy was strong enough to secretly transport 30,000 troops to the bridgehead at Oranienbaum and break the siege of Leningrad.

For much of the conflict, only submarines could risk the passage into the open sea to strike at German shipping. They were particularly successful towards the end of the war, sinking ships such as Wilhelm Gustloff, General von Steuben and Goya, causing great loss of life.

==== Grouping in June 1941 ====
- Battleship squadron/division
  - battleship Marat (named after Jean-Paul Marat)
  - battleship Oktyabrskaya Revolutsiya (named after the October Revolution)
  - destroyer leader Leningrad (named after the city of Leningrad)
  - destroyer leader Minsk (named after the capital of Belarus)
- 1st destroyer division/1 Flotilla
  - cruiser Kirov
  - destroyer Gnevny
  - destroyer Gordyy
  - destroyer Grozyashchiy
  - destroyer Smetlivyi
  - destroyer Steregushchy
- 2nd destroyer division/2 Flotilla
  - Serdity
  - Silnyi
  - Stoikiy
  - Storozhevoy
- 3rd destroyer division/3 Flotilla
  - Karl Marx
  - Volodarsky
  - Lenin
  - Yakov Sverdlov
  - Artiom
  - Engels
  - Kalinin
- Guards division/Naval Guards Squadron
  - Burya
  - Sneg
  - Taifun
  - Tsiklon
  - Tucha
  - Vihr
- Minesweeper Division/Task Group
  - Minelayer Marti
  - Minesweepers T-201, T-202, T-203, T-204, T-205, T-206, T-207, T-208, T-209, T-210, T-211, T-212, T-213, T-214, T-215, T-216, T-217 and T-218
  - 15 auxiliary minesweepers
- 1st submarine brigade/1 Submarine Battle Fleet
  - S-1, S-3, S-4, S-5, S-6, S-7, S-8, S-9, S-10, S-101, S-102, L3, M-71, M-77, M-78, M-79, M-80, M-81, M-83, ex-Estonian submarine Lembit, ex-Estonian submarine Kalev, ex-Latvian submarine Ronis, ex-Latvian submarine Spidola
- 2nd submarine brigade/2 Submarine Battle Fleet
  - Shch-309, Shch-310, Shch-311, Shch-317, Shch-318, Shch-319, Shch-320, Shch-322, Shch-323, Shch-324, M-90, M-94, M-95, M-96, M-97, M-98, M-99, M-102, M-103
- Support vessels
  - transport Eestirand (VT 532)
  - Oka (named after the river of Oka)
  - Polyarnaya Zvezda (Polar Star)
- Training Task Group/Division of the Navy
  - M-72, M-73, M-74, M-75, M-76, Shch-303, Shch-304, K-3, K-21, K-22, K-23, L-1, L-2, S-11, S-12, Shch-405, Shch-406
- Training Task Group
  - Shch-301, Shch-302, Shch-305, Shch-306, Shch-307, Shch-308, P-1, P-2, P-3

=== Cold War ===
During the Immediate post-war period the importance of the Red-Banner Baltic Fleet increased despite the Baltic being a shallow sea with the exits easily becoming choke points by other countries. The Baltic Fleet was increased to two Fleets, the 4th Red-Banner Baltic Fleet and the 8th Red-Banner Baltic Fleet on 15 February 1946. However, during the post-Stalinist period and general reforms and downsizing in the Soviet Armed Forces the two fleets of the Baltic were again reduced, with many vessels, some built before the Revolution, were scrapped, and the fleet was again renamed Red-Banner Baltic Fleet on 24 December 1955.

In Liepāja the Baltic Fleet's 14th submarine squadron, call sign "Kompleks" ("Комплекс") was stationed with 16 submarines (613, 629a, 651); as was the 6th group of rear supply of Baltic Fleet, and the 81st design bureau and reserve command center of the same force.

On June 1, 1960, as part of the reduction of the USSR Armed Forces, the management of the 8th mine-torpedo Gatchina Red Banner Aviation Division and both of its regiments were disbanded. The 469th aircraft storage base was formed at the Dunaevka airfield, where the IL-28s of the disbanded 8th MTAD and the 128th Guards MTAD were transferred. The storage base lasted one year.

Far from being reduced in importance, operations of the Red-Banner Baltic Fleet during the early-Cold War period earned it a great amount of prestige and profile, with the second awarding of the Order of Red Banner being presented on 7 May 1965 when the fleet was again renamed as the Twice Red-Banner Baltic Fleet. Although the Soviet Union poured resources into building up the Northern Fleet and the Pacific Fleet, both of which had easy access to the open ocean, the Twice Red-Banner Baltic Fleet assumed the important position of supporting the northern flank of the European Theatre in case of a confrontation with NATO.

This role was under-rated from the blue water navies perspective, but was seen as a highly valuable one from the strategic perspective of the Soviet General Staff planning. The Twice Red-Banner Baltic Fleet remained a powerful force, which in the event of war was tasked with conducting amphibious assaults against the coast of Denmark and West Germany, in cooperation with allied Polish and East German naval forces.

A notable incident involving the fleet occurred in 1975 when a mutiny broke out on the frigate Storozhevoy. There were also numerous allegations by Sweden of Baltic Fleet submarines illegally penetrating its territorial waters. In October 1981, the Soviet Whiskey-class submarine U 137 ran aground in Swedish territorial waters, near the important naval base of Karlskrona, causing a serious diplomatic incident. Swedish naval vessels pulled the submarine into deeper water and permitted it to return to the Soviet fleet in early November.

== Commanders ==
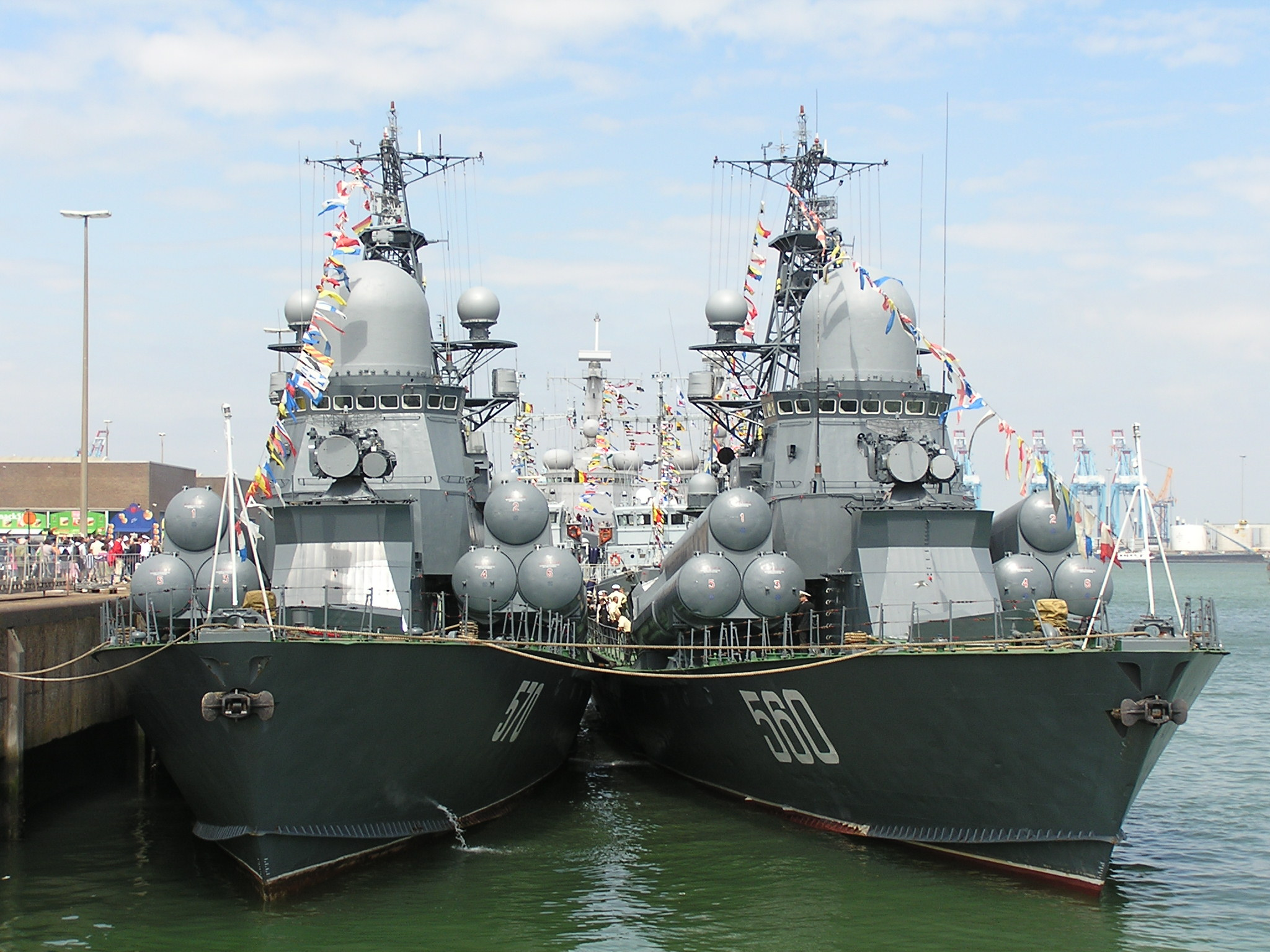
Russian small missile ships Zyb' and Passat of the Project 12341

Name	Period of command
Nikolai Ottovich von Essen	3 December 1909 – 7 May 1915
Vasily Alexandrovich Kanin	14 May 1915 – 16 September 1916
Adrian Ivanovich Nepenin	16 September 1916 – 4 March 1917
Andrei Semyonovich Maksimov	4 March 1917 – 1 June 1917
Dmitry Nikolayevich Verderevsky	1 June 1917 – 5 July 1917
Aleksandr Vladimirovich Razvozov	7 July – 5 December 1917
Aleksandr Antonovich Ruzhek	7 December 1917 – 13 March 1918
Aleksandr Vladimirovich Razvozov	13–20 March 1918
Aleksey Mikhaylovich Shchastnyy	22 March – 26 May 1918
Sergey Valeryanovich Zarubayev	27 May 1918 – 18 January 1919
Aleksandr Pavlovich Zelenoy	18 January 1919 – 2 July 1920
Fedor Fedorovich Raskolnikov	2 July 1920 – 27 January 1921
Vladimir Andreyevich Kukel (Acting)	27 January – 3 March 1921
Ivan Kuzmich Kozhanov	3 March – 4 May 1921
Mikhail Vladimirovich Viktorov	4 May 1921 – 6 May 1924
Aleksandr Karlovich Vekman	1924–1926
Mikhail Vladimirovich Viktorov	1926–1932
Lev Mikhaylovich Galler	22 August 1932 – 25 January 1937
Aleksandr Kuzmich Sivkov	25 January – 15 August 1937
Ivan Stepanovich Isakov	15 August 1937 – 9 January 1938
Gordey Ivanovich Levchenko	10 January 1938 – 27 April 1939
Vladimir Filippovich Tributs	28 April 1939 – 15 February 1946

In 1946 the Baltic Fleet was split into two commands, the 4th and 8th Fleets

4th Fleet		8th Fleet	
Gordey Ivanovich Levchenko	February 1946 – March 1947	Vladimir Filippovich Tributs	February 1946 – May 1947
Vladimir Aleksandrovich Andreyev	March 1947 – August 1952	Fyodor Vladimirich Zozulya	May 1947 – February 1950
Arseniy Grigoriyevich Golovko	August 1952 – December 1955	Nikolay Mikhaylovich Kharlamov	February 1950 – December 1954
		Vladimir Afanasyevich Kasatonov	December 1954 – December 1955

In 1956 the two fleets were reunited into a single Baltic Fleet command

Name	Period of command
Arseniy Grigoryevich Golovko	27 January – 24 November 1956
Nikolay Mikhaylovich Kharlamov	24 November 1956 – 29 May 1959
Aleksandr Yevstafyevich Oryol	29 May 1959 – 27 January 1967
Vladimir Vasilyevich Mikhaylin	27 January 1967 – 1 September 1975
Anatoly Mikhaylovich Kosov	1 September 1975 – 2 June 1978
Vladimir Vasilyevich Sidorov	2 June 1978 – 12 February 1981
Ivan Matveyevich Kapitanets	12 February 1981 – 25 February 1985
Konstantin Valentinovich Makarov	25 February 1985 – 30 December 1985
Vitaly Pavlovich Ivanov	30 December 1985 – December 1991
Vladimir Grigoryevich Yegorov	13 December 1991 – 2000
Vladimir Prokofyevich Valuyev	11 April 2001 – May 2006
Konstantin Semenovich Sidenko	May 2006 – 6 December 2007
Viktor Nikolayevich Mardusin	6 December 2007 – 8 September 2009
Viktor Viktorovich Chirkov	8 September 2009 – May 2012
Viktor Petrovich Kravchuk	May 2012 – 29 June 2016
Aleksandr Mikhailovich Nosatov	29 June 2016 (acting), confirmed 17 September 2016 – 5 October 2021
Viktor Nikolayevich Liina	5 October 2021 – 22 April 2023
Vladimir Vorobyov	22 April 2023 – 8 July 2024
Sergei Lipilin	8 July 2024 – present

== Russian Federation ==
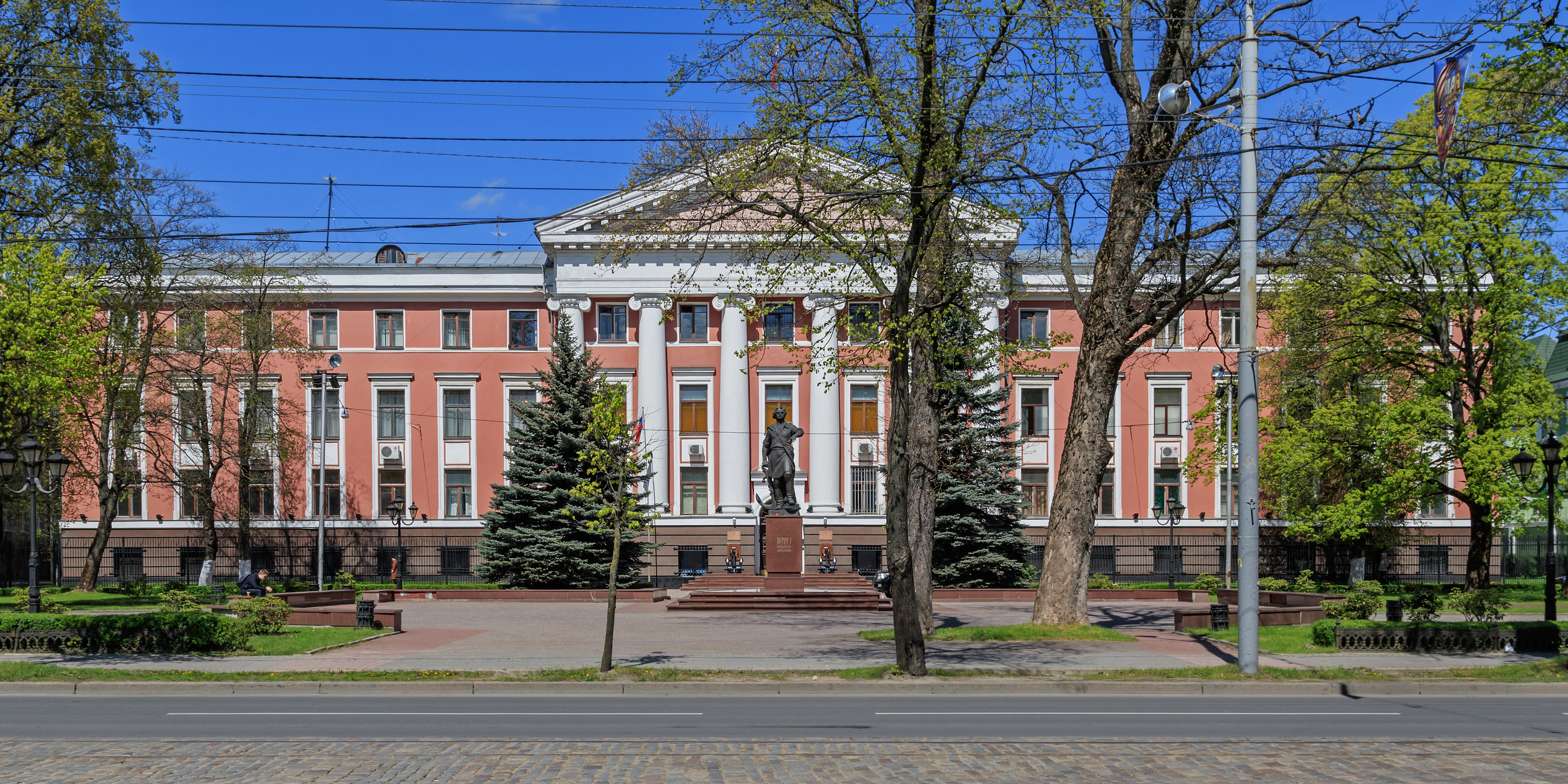
The Baltic Fleet headquarters building, Kaliningrad

The breakup of the Soviet Union deprived the fleet of key bases in Estonia, Latvia and Lithuania, leaving Kaliningrad Oblast as the fleet's only ice-free naval outlet to the Baltic Sea. However, the Kaliningrad Oblast between Poland and Lithuania is not contiguous with the rest of the national territory of the Russian Federation.

In the immediate post-Soviet period, the capabilities of the Baltic Fleet were significantly reduced. From 1991/1992 to 1994/95, vessels in the Baltic Fleet declined from 350 at the beginning of the decade to 109 available vessels. At the same time, with the dissolution of the Warsaw Pact, the formerly allied East German Navy was absorbed by West Germany and the Polish Navy no longer supplemented the strength of the Baltic Fleet.

Russian Land forces in the region were also sharply reduced. In 1989 3rd Guards Motor Rifle Division at Klaipėda was transferred to the fleet as a coastal defence division. It was disbanded on 1 September 1993. In the late 1990s the 336th Guards Naval Infantry Brigade and the remnant of the 11th Guards Army of the Baltic Military District were subordinated to a single command named the Ground and Coastal Forces of the Baltic Fleet under a deputy fleet commander.

The 11th Guards Army remnant included the 7th Guards Motor Rifle Regiment and the brigade that was the former 18th Guards Motor Rifle Division, plus several Bases for Storage of Weapons and Equipment, holding enough vehicles and weaponry for a division but only having a few hundred men assigned to maintain the equipment and guard the bases. "warfare.be" listings in 2013 report that the staff of the Ground and Coastal Defence Forces of the fleet may have been disbanded in November 2007. In 2007, according to the IISS, the fleet's aviation units were equipped with a total of 23 Su-27, 26 Su-24, 14 An-12/24/26, 2 An-12 Cub (MR/EW), 11 Mi-24 Hind, 19 Ka-28 Helix, 8 Ka-29 Helix assault helicopters, and 17 Mi-8 Hip transport helicopters. As of 2020, the 18th Guards Motorized Rifle Division was reconstituted, serving within the 13th Army Corps, headquartered in Kaliningrad.

As of 2008 the Baltic Fleet included about 75 combat ships of various types. The main base is in Baltiysk and a second operational base is in Kronstadt. The Leningrad Naval Base is an administrative entity that is not a discrete geographic location but comprises all of the naval institutions and facilities in the St. Petersburg area.

During the 2010s renewed emphasis was placed on modernizing Russian naval capabilities. In the Baltic, this process has proceeded slowly though there has been particular emphasis on acquiring new light units. New corvettes (of the Steregushchiy, Buyan-M and Karakurt classes) have been incrementally added to the fleet with additional vessels from the Karakurt, and potentially the Steregushchiy-class, anticipated in the 2020s - though not necessarily at a rate that will be sufficient to replace the fleet's older Soviet-era corvettes and missile boats on a one-for-one basis. Nevertheless, utilizing Russia's internal waterways, additional cruise missile-armed light units, drawn from Russia's other Western fleets or from the Caspian Flotilla, have the capacity to reinforce the Baltic Fleet as may be needed. A further aspect of modernization has focused on the build-up of Russian shore-based anti-ship and air defence capabilities in the Kaliningrad region.

In contrast to the three other Russian fleets, the Baltic Fleet's submarine capabilities are extremely modest with just one older Kilo-class boat deployed in 2020, largely for training purposes. Nevertheless, a strengthening of these capabilities in the 2020s was being considered with various options (including both Improved Kilos and/or new Lada-class submarines) apparently on the table.

Training and readiness levels have also been emphasized to be of key importance. In June 2016, fleet commander Vice Admiral Viktor Kravchuk and his chief of staff, Vice Admiral Sergei Popov, were dismissed for "serious training shortcomings and distortion of the real situation". N. G. Kuznetsov Naval Academy commander Vice Admiral Alexander Nosatov was made acting commander of the fleet, a position in which he was confirmed on 17 September.

Analysis undertaken by Anders Nielsen of the Royal Danish Defence College in 2019 concludes that the Russian Baltic Fleet is oriented to contributing to Russian global deployment and expeditionary operations in peacetime. However, it is also the smallest of the Russian Navy's four principal fleets (in terms of surface warships and submarines combined) and therefore, due to its limited strength, would play primarily a defensive role in the Baltic Sea in most conflict or wartime scenarios.

On Russia's "Navy Day" on July 31, 2022, President Putin reportedly indicated that the Baltic Fleet was to be prioritized for modernization in the coming years. The pending entry of Sweden and Finland into NATO - in response to Russian invasion of Ukraine - would significantly strengthen NATO naval forces in the Baltic, particularly taking into account the strength of the Swedish Navy's submarine fleet. Russian commentators suggested that a modernization and expansion of Russian submarine forces in the Baltic would therefore likely be a priority in the coming years.

=== Russian invasion of Ukraine ===
Deployed in Ukraine since the start of the invasion in 2022, the Baltic Fleet's 11th Army Corps reportedly suffered heavy losses in the initial stages of the war. In 2024, amid increasing tensions with NATO and as part of a comprehensive re-organization of Russian Ground Forces, it was reported that the 11th Army Corps had been transferred from the control of the Baltic Fleet to the command of the Leningrad Military District.

In 2024, the Russian Buyan M-class corvette Serpukhov was reportedly sabotaged in Kaliningrad by Ukrainian special forces, putting the vessel temporarily out of service. In 2025, the Baltic was emerging as a flashpoint region in tensions between Russia and NATO, in particular around the activities of Russia's shadow tanker fleet. The Baltic Fleet was assuming an increasingly prominent role in protecting vessels of this tanker fleet from potential disruption or seizure by NATO countries. The fleet has also played a more prominent role in trying to sustain the Russian navy's Mediterranean Sea Task Force in the face of limitations imposed by Turkey related to the use of the Turkish Straits, and in the context of the Russo-Ukraine War, which have combined to restrict the ability of the Black Sea Fleet to fulfill that role.

Owing to the significantly weakened position for Russia in the Baltic region, resulting from the Swedish and Finnish entry into NATO, the Baltic Fleet itself has begun to incorporate new approaches for potential operations in the eastern Baltic in the event of military conflict. Potentially this might incorporate greater use of Lake Ladoga as a possible bastion for the Baltic Fleet's numerous but smaller Karakurt and Buyan-M class corvettes incorporating Kalibr long-range cruise missile systems capable of attacking targets at considerable distance.

== Order of battle ==
Since 2024, the Baltic Fleet has been directly subordinate to the Russian Navy's general command. Prior to 2024, the fleet had been part of the former and larger Western Military District, but that command was divided in 2024 into the Moscow and Leningrad Military Districts, giving the latter command the dominant role along Russia's northern boundary with NATO member states. Russian ground forces, formerly subordinate to the Baltic Fleet, were transferred to the command of the Leningrad Military District, while some air force units (also formerly subordinate to the Baltic Fleet) were transferred directly to the Russian Air Force.

The Kaliningrad region serves as the principal base area for the Baltic Fleet and also hosts significant land and air forces, both to defend Kaliningrad and to extend Russian shore-based air and sea denial capabilities (A2/AD) into the Baltic Sea and region.

Additionally, in 2025, the Russian Coast Guard was said to deploy about 33 patrol vessels of various types in the Baltic region, plus additional patrol units deployed on Lake Peipus along the Estonian frontier.

=== Surface vessels and submarines ===
Baltic Fleet naval infantry & Russian ground force units Major elements of both divisions deployed in Ukraine since 2022; nearby Polish units also shown (another brigade of the Polish 16th Mech Div. is to the east of the 15th Mech Bde)
- 12th Surface Ship Division (Baltiysk)
  - Major Surface Combatants (128th Surface Ship Brigade)
    - 1? x Project 956 (Sovremenny-class) destroyer:
      - Nastoychivy (610) (fleet flagship; likely decommissioned, may have been replaced with destroyer Severomorsk - not officially confirmed and Severomorsk has not been officially re-tasked from the Northern Fleet, though she was operating in the Baltic as of late 2026)
    - 2 x Project 11540 (Neustrashimy-class) frigates:
      - Neustrashimy (712) (active as of 2026)
      - Yaroslav Mudry (777) (active as of 2021)
    - 5 x Project 20380 (Steregushchiy-class) multi-role corvettes:
      - Steregushchiy (530) (reported in modernization refit as of 2023)
      - Soobrazitelnyy (531) (active as of 2026)
      - Boikiy (532) (reported attacked in dry dock by Ukrainian drones in June 2026; likely major damage)
      - Stoikiy (545) (active as of 2026)
      - Merkury (535) (commissioned in 2023 and nominally assigned to the Black Sea Fleet; owing to the Russo-Ukraine War and limitations imposed by Turkey related to the use of the Bosphorus Strait has been restricted in entering the Black Sea; operates as part of Russia's Mediterranean Sea Task Force and the Baltic Fleet de facto)
    - 1 x Project 11356R (Admiral Grigorovich-class) frigate Admiral Grigorovich (745) (active as of 2026; part of the Black Sea Fleet but operating in the Baltic/Mediterranean since 2022)
  - Amphibious Warfare Vessels (71st Red Star Landing Ship Brigade)
    - 4? x Project 775 (Ropucha-class) landing ships:
      - Minsk (122) (deployed to the Black Sea for the Russo-Ukraine War; heavily damaged by Ukrainian attack in September 2023; reportedly under repair as of 2024)
      - Kaliningrad (102) (deployed to the Black Sea and participating in the Russo-Ukraine War as of 2022)
      - Aleksandr Shabalin (110) (active as of 2026)
      - Korolyov (130) (deployed to the Black Sea and participating in the Russo-Ukraine War as of 2022)
    - 2 x Project 1232.2 (Zubr-class) LCACs (both active as of 2025):
      - Evgeniy Kocheshkov (770)
      - Mordoviya (782)
    - Other landing craft
      - 3 × Project 21820 (Dyugon-class) landing craft (entered service 2014/15 - Denis Davydov, Leytenant Rimskiy-Korsakov?, Michman Lermontov?)
      - 5 × Project 1176 (Ondatra-class) landing craft (D-325, D-365, D-465, D-?, PKAO-772 - assigned to FSB Coast Guard)
      - 3 × Project 11770 (Serna-class) landing craft (D-67, Alexey Barinov, Ivan Pasko)
      - 2? × Project 02510 (BK-16-class) high-speed assault boats (D-315 entered service 2020; second vessel status unknown)

==== Leningrad Naval Base (Kronstadt) ====
  - Conventionally-powered attack submarines (SSKs) (123rd Submarine Brigade):
    - 1 x Project 877 (Kilo-class) SSK (Dmitrov, B-806; forty-year old boat reported still in service as of 2025)
    - 1 x Project 677 Lada-class submarine (Velikiye Luki; entered service 2025; may be tasked to the Northern Fleet)
    - 2 x Project 636.3 Improved Kilo-class SSK (B-261 Novorossiysk & B-265 Krasnodar; both assigned to the Black Sea Fleet but operating in the Baltic and with the Mediterranean Sea Task Force since 2022; Novorossiysk reportedly damaged by fuel system malfunction while operating in the Mediterranean in September 2025; Krasnodar likely active in the Mediterranean as of early 2026)

As of mid-2025, two other Improved Kilo-class submarines (Mozhaysk and Yakutsk, destined for the Pacific Fleet) were also operating in the Baltic in advance of deploying to their intended fleet.

  - 105th Naval Region Protection Brigade
    - 3 x Project 133.1 (Parchim-class) anti-submarine (ASW) corvettes (144th Tactical Group):
      - Zelenodolsk (308) (active as of 2025)
      - Urengoy (304) (active as of 2025)
      - Kazanets (311) (active as of 2025)
    - Mine Countermeasures Vessels (145th Tactical Group):
      - Pavel Khenov (561) (Project 1265 (Sonya-class) minesweeper; active as of 2025)
      - PDKA 89/PDKA 910 firefighting boats
    - 2 × Project 10750 (Lida-class) minesweepers:
      - RT-57 (status uncertain; may have decommissioned in 2026)
      - RT-248
    - Buran (Project 97 icebreaker) (active as of 2024)

==== Baltiysk Naval Base (Baltiysk) ====
- 64th Maritime Region Protection Brigade
  - 3 x Project 133.1 (Parchim-class) ASW corvettes (146th Tactical Group):
    - Aleksin (218) (active as of 2026)
    - Kabardino-Balkaria (243) (active as of 2026)
    - Kalmykiya (232)
  - 2-3 x Project 1265 (Sonya-class) minesweeper (147th & 148th Tactical Groups):
    - Sergey Kolbasev (formerly BT-213; status uncertain, may have decommissioned in 2023)
    - Novocheboksarsk (formerly BT-212; active as of 2022)
    - Leonid Sobolev (formerly BT-230; active as of 2022)
  - 6 x Project 21631 (Buyan M-class) missile corvettes (36th Red Banner Order of Nakhimov Missile Ship Brigade):
    - Serpukhov (active as of 2025)
    - Zelenyy Dol (active as of 2025)
    - Grad (active as of 2026; attacked in internal Russian waterways in 2025, but repaired)
    - Naro-Fominsk (active as of 2026; attacked and damaged by Ukrainian drones in November 2026)
    - Stavropol (entered service 2025; active in 2026)
    - Orekhovo-Zuyevo (part of the Black Sea Fleet but operating in the Mediterranean/Baltic region as of 2024)
  - 5 (+1?) x Project 22800 (Karakurt-class) missile corvettes (1st Guards Missile Boat Battalion):
    - Mytishchi (active as of 2024)
    - Sovetsk (as of 2024, upgraded with Tor-M2 km air defence system)
    - Odintsovo (Pantsir-M surface-to-air missiles incorporated 2024)
    - Amur (entered service in the Caspian in 2024; but transferred to the Baltic as of October 2025)
    - Burya (entered service in 2026)
    - Kozelsk (status unclear, vulnerability due to construction at the More (Feodosiya) shipyard in Crimea; reported on "tests" as of 2024; may commission in due course)
  - 3 x Project 1234 (Nanuchka-class) missile corvettes (106th Small Missile Ship Battalion):
    - Geyzer (555)
    - Zyb (560)
    - Passat (570) (active as of 2022)
  - 4 x Project 1241 (Tarantul III-class) missile corvettes (reported based in Kaliningrad region as of 2018):
    - Chuvashiya (active as of 2024)
    - Dimitrovgrad (active as of 2024)
    - Zarechnyy (active as of 2026)
    - Morshansk (active as of 2025)
  - 3 × Project 12700 (Alexandrit-class) minesweepers:
    - Alexander Obukhov (507) (active as of 2025)
    - Lev Chernavin (660) (active as of 2025)
    - Vladimir Emelyanov (assigned to the Black Sea Fleet but operating in the Mediterranean/Baltic as of 2023)
  - 2 × Project 10750 (Lida-class) minesweepers:
    - Vasily Polyakov (formerly RT-252) (active as of 2025)
    - Victor Sigalov (formerly RT-273)

==== Other vessels ====
- Patrol/anti-saboteur boats
  - 1 x Project 22160 patrol ship Viktor Velikiy (active as of 2026; destined for the Black Sea Fleet, but operating in the Baltic/Mediterranean operational area)
  - 4 × Project 21980 (Grachonok-class) anti-saboteur ships:
    - Nakhimovets (P-104)
    - P-468
    - Vladimir Nosov (P-471)
    - P-474
  - 9 × Project 03160 (Raptor-class) patrol boats:
    - Yunarmeets Baltiki (P-342) (originally assigned to the Baltic Fleet, but serving in the Black Sea Fleet when attacked and damaged in 2022; she is since reported to have been repaired)
    - Maksim Panin (P-281)
    - P-344
    - Georgiy Potekhin (P-415)
    - Grigory Davidenko (P-437)
    - P-461
    - P-462
    - Evgeny Kolesnikov
    - Yunarmeets Moskvy (P-456)

Additional smaller Russian navy patrol boats are deployed in the Baltic while some may have been transferred to the Black Sea. See: List of active Russian Navy ships#Patrol boats

Principal Auxiliaries For a more complete list see: List of active Russian Navy ships#Auxiliaries

- Intelligence vessels
  - 2 × Project 503R (Alpinist-class) vessels
    - Syzran
    - Zhigulevsk (active as of 2026)
  - 2 × Project 864 (Vishnya-class) intelligence ships:
    - Fedor Golovin
    - Vasiliy Tatishchev (active as of 2026)
  - Baklan-class intelligence ship KSV-2168
  - Moma-class intelligence vessel Kil'din: (from the Black Sea Fleet but operating in the Mediterranean/Baltic; may have suffered some damage due to accidental fire in the Mediterranean in early 2025)
  - 2 x Project 141 Salvage vessel/ Submersible support: Alexandr Pushkin & SS-750 (SS-750 reported active as of 2023)
- Training vessels
  - 2 × Project 887 training ship (Smolnyy - active as of 2025 - and Perekop - active as of 2026)
- Fleet oilers/support vessels:
  - 2 × Project 160 oilers (Elnya and Kola; Elnya active as of 2026; Kola active as of 2021)
  - 2 x Project 03182 replenishment oilers Vice Admiral Paromov & Valentin Rykov (both part of the Black Sea Fleet but deployed in the Mediterranean/Baltic)
  - Project 23130 replenishment oiler Vasiliy Nikitin (projected for the Black Sea Fleet; but built at the Sredne-Nevsky Shipyard and commissioned in the Baltic in April 2025)
  - Project 03180 class: Alexandr Grebenschikov
  - 3 × Project 304 repair ships (PM-30, PM-86 and PM-82; PM-82 reported active and operating in the English Channel as of 2026)
- Hydrographic survey vessels
  - 1 × Project 862 (Yug-class) (Nikolay Matusevich)
  - 1 x Project 852 Expeditionary oceanographic vessel (Akademik Krylov-class): Admiral Vladimirsky (active as of 2025)

=== Aviation and Air Defence Forces ===
- 34th Mixed Aviation Division: (HQ: Kaliningrad) (Division established in 2019)
  - 4th Separate Naval Attack Aviation Regiment (regiment re-established starting 2017): Two Squadrons (with Su-24 and 12 Su-30SM/SM2 - with Kh-61 anti-ship missile)
  - 125th Independent Helicopter Squadron – HQ at Chkalovsk – operating Mi-8, Mi-24 (this was the former 288th Independent Helicopter Regt of the 11th Guards Army and used to be at Nivenskoye)
  - 396th Independent Shipborne Anti-Submarine Helicopter Squadron – Donskoye Air Base – Ka-27/M, Ka-29; (Ka-27M model ASW helicopters reportedly added October 2018.)
  - 398th Independent Air Transport Squadron – HQ at Khrabrovo – An-2, An-12, An-24, An-26, Be-12, Mi-8.
- [689th Independent Fighter Aviation Regiment – Kaliningrad Chkalovsk Two Squadrons: operating Su-30SM2, but also incorporating the Su-35S/SM as of 2026; as of 2024 this regiment is no longer under the command of the Baltic Fleet but is subordinate to the 6th Guards Air Force and Air Defence Army of the Russian Air Force]

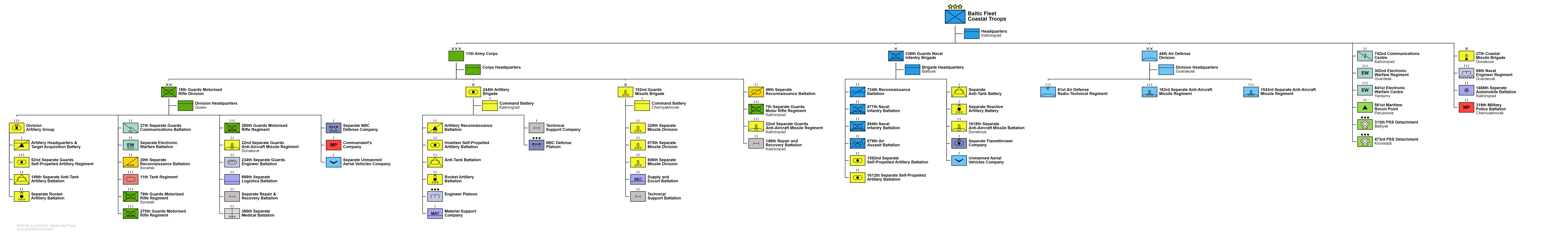
The Russian Baltic Fleet Naval Infantry Forces (prior to reassignment of the 11th Army Corps to Russian ground forces & the elevation of the 336th Naval Infantry Brigade to "Division" strength)

- [44th Air Defence Division (also no longer under the Baltic Fleet but subordinate to the 6th Guards Air Army of the Russian Air Force)
  - 183rd Guards Air Defence Missile Regiment (Two battalions with S-300P SAMs; four battalions with S-400 SAMs; six Pantsir-S1 SAM systems), in Gvardeysk
  - 1545th Air Defence Missile Regiment (Two battalions with S-400 SAMs), in Znamensk (both 183rd and 1545th Air Defence Regiments were equipped with S-400 SAM systems starting in 2019.)]

=== Baltic Fleet Coastal Forces ===
- Naval Infantry/Special Forces
  - 120th Guards Naval Infantry Division (formerly 336th Guards Naval Infantry Brigade) based in Baltiysk: reportedly expanded from brigade to division strength as of December 2025; as of September 2025, elements of the (former) brigade were reportedly operating in the area of Pokrovsk in eastern Ukraine as part of intensified Russian combat operations there. Elements of the brigade had previously been reported as operating in the area of Novopavlivka.
  - 561st "Maritime Recon Point" (Special Forces battalion - HQ at Parusnoye)
  - 69th Guards Naval Engineer Regiment, in Gvardeysk
- Surface-to-Surface Missile Units
  - 152nd Guards Missile Brigade (9K720 Iskander-M), at Chernyakhovsk Air Base
  - 25th Coastal Defence Missile Brigade (BAL-E/K-300P Bastion-P/Monolit-BR coastal defence radars), at Donskoye Air Base
    - Coastal missile defence unit (Bastion/Bal systems) being established in Kronshtadt, Leningrad Oblast under Baltic Fleet command as of 2021.
    - 299th Training Center of Coastal Forces, in Gvardeysk
    - 561st Reconnaissance Center, in Parusnoye
    - 742nd Communication Center, in Kaliningrad
    - 841st Independent Electronic Warfare Center, in Yantarny
    - 313th Special Detachment of Anti-Sabotage Forces and Means, in Baltiysk
    - 473rd Special Detachment of Anti-Sabotage Forces and Means, in Kronstadt

=== Logistics ===
Among the materiel support bases of the Baltic Fleet is the arsenal (complex storage of missiles, ammunition and explosive materials, 2nd category), Military Unit 55443-ЛЙ (-25) (formerly the 15th Arsenal of the Navy, military unit 69233, since 2010 7082nd Technical Mine-Torpedo Base of the Navy, 1st grade, military unit 81263), located at Bolshaya Izhora, Lomonosovsky District, Leningrad Oblast.

== See also ==
- Baltic Fleet electoral district (Russian Constituent Assembly election, 1917)
