= Donskoye (air base) =

Air base in Kaliningrad Oblast, Russia

Donskoye
- Donskoye, Kaliningrad Oblast in Russia
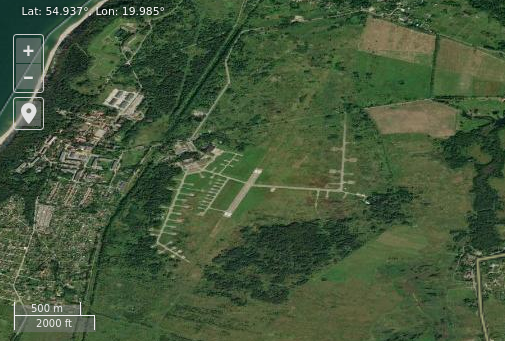
- Satellite imagery of Donskoye air base

Site information
- Type: Air Base
- Owner: Ministry of Defence
- Operator: Russian Navy - Russian Naval Aviation
- Controlled by: Baltic Fleet

Location
- Shown within Kaliningrad Oblast Donskoye (Russia)
- Coordinates: 54°56′12″N 19°59′6″E

Site history
- Built: 1945
- In use: 1945 - present

Airfield information
- Elevation: 50 metres (164 ft) AMSL
Runways
Direction	Length and surface
02/20	500 metres (1,640 ft) Concrete

Donskoye (also Bryusterort or Donskoe) is an air base in Kaliningrad Oblast, Russia, located 1 km east of Donskoye.

The base is home to the 72nd Guards Aviation Base.

It probably dates back to World War II, and is located nearly at Russia's most extreme western point. The facility contains 25 aircraft pads. Its original length was 2000m, but only 500m remains. Its pads are occupied by a number of helicopters.

The base was used by the:

- 28th Guards Fighter Aviation Regiment between 1945 and 1947.
- 68th Guards Fighter Aviation Regiment between 1945 and 1947.
- 72nd Guards Fighter Aviation Regiment during 1945.

Units stationed at Donskoye in the early 1990s included 396 OKPLVP (396th Independent Shipborne Anti-submarine Helicopter Regiment) flying 22 Kamov Ka-27 (ASCC: Helix) helicopters; and 745 OPLVP (745th Independent Anti-submarine Helicopter Regiment), which joined in 1958, flying 15 Mil Mi-14 (ASCC: Haze) helicopters and 5 Kamov Ka-25 (ASCC: Hormone) helicopters.

== See also ==
- List of military airbases in Russia
