= Aleksandr Vladimirovich Razvozov =

Russian and Soviet admiral (1879–1920)

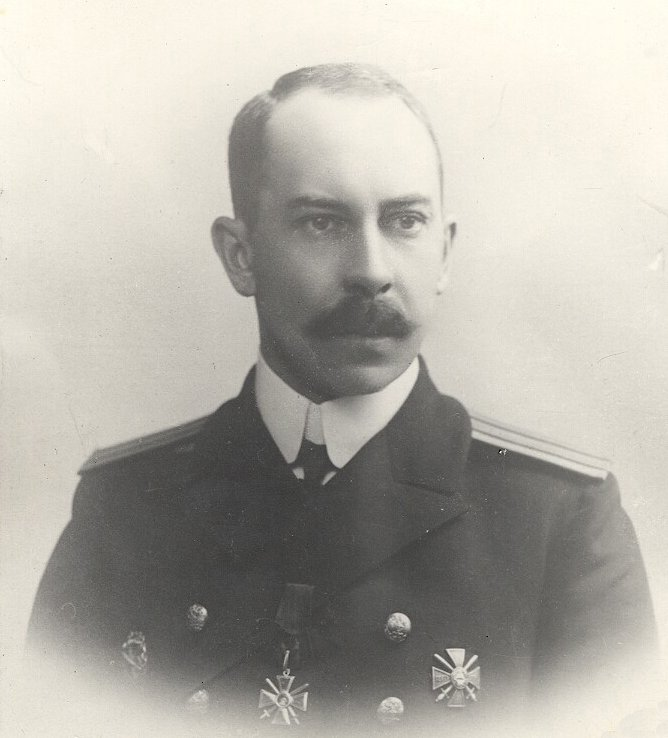
- Aleksandr Razvozov
- Born: June 27, 1879; Tallinn, Governorate of Estonia, Russian Empire
- Died: June 14, 1920 (aged 40); Petrograd, Soviet Russia
- Military career
- Allegiance: Russian Empire; Soviet Russia
- Branch: Imperial Russian Navy; Red Fleet
- Service years: 1888–1920
- Rank: Rear Admiral
- Commands: Baltic Fleet
- Conflicts: Russo Japanese War; World War I Russian Civil War
- Awards: Order of St. Vladimir; Order of St. Anna; Légion d'honneur (France)

Aleksandr Vladimirovich Razvozov (Russian: Алекса́ндр Влади́мирович Разво́зов; June 27, 1879 – June 14, 1920) was a Russian and Soviet admiral. He was the first commander of the Soviet Baltic Fleet.

== Biography ==
Razvozov was born into a naval family in Reval, Estonia. He graduated from the Sea Cadet Corps in 1889 and first served on the cruiser Gerzog Edinburgski. He specialised in torpedo warfare and became torpedo officer on the battleship Retvizan in 1901 and served aboard that ship during the Russo-Japanese War. He took part in the Siege of Port Arthur and the Battle of the Yellow Sea.

Razvozov was repatriated in 1906 in the last tranche of prisoners of war and taught at the mine and torpedo school in Kronstadt. In 1907 he was appointed torpedo officer on the cruiser Rurik. In 1912 he was given command of the destroyer Burny and in 1914 the destroyer Ussuriyets. On the outbreak of war he commanded a destroyer squadron of the Baltic Fleet.

Razvozov was appointed commander of the destroyer forces of the Baltic Fleet in March 1917 and was given command of the Fleet itself in June 1917. He was dismissed from service in late 1917 and then re-instated and finally dismissed and arrested in March 1918. Razvozov was soon released and worked in the naval archive during the remainder of 1918 and 1919. He was arrested by the Cheka in September 1919 on suspicion of conspiracy with the White Russian forces of General Nikolai Yudenich. He was imprisoned in the Kresty Prison and died of infection following an appendectomy. He is buried in the Smolensky Cemetery in Saint Petersburg.

== Honours and awards ==
- Order of St. Vladimir, 4th class, with swords and bow
- Order of St. Anna, 4th class, with swords
- Order of St. Anna, 4th class with the inscription "For Bravery"
- Order of St. Stanislaus, 2nd class with swords
- Gold Sword for Bravery
- Chevalier of the Legion of Honour
- Orders of Denmark and Montenegro

== Sources ==
- - Russian Language Biography
- - Russian Language Biography
