= Russian destroyer Nastoychivy =

Sovremenny-class destroyer of the Russian Navy

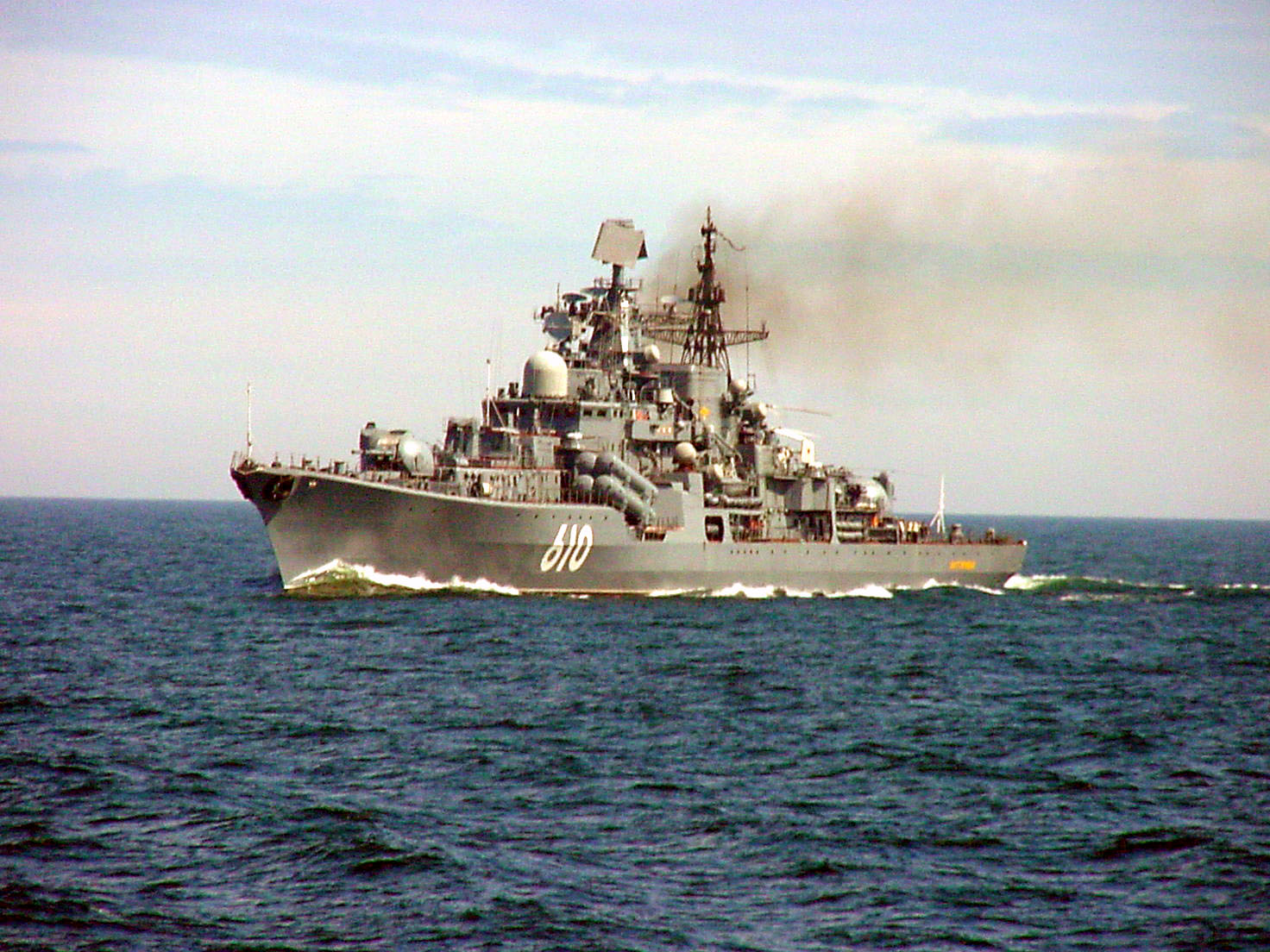
- Nastoychivy on 6 June 2005

History

Soviet Union → Russia
- Name: Moskovsky Komsomolets; (Моско́вский комсомо́лец)
- Renamed: Nastoychivy; (Настойчивый)
- Namesake: Komsomol of Moscow; Persistent in Russian
- Builder: Severnaya Verf, Leningrad
- Laid down: 7 April 1988
- Launched: 19 January 1991
- Commissioned: 30 December 1992
- Home port: Kaliningrad
- Identification: Pennant number: 610, 675, 810
- Status: Undergoing overhaul since 2019; reported to have possibly decommissioned in 2025

General characteristics
- Class & type: Sovremenny-class destroyer
- Displacement: 6,600 tons standard, 8,480 tons full load
- Length: 156 m (511 ft 10 in)
- Beam: 17.3 m (56 ft 9 in)
- Draught: 6.5 m (21 ft 4 in)
- Propulsion: 2 shaft steam turbines, 4 boilers, 75,000 kW (100,000 hp), 2 fixed propellers, 2 turbo generators, and 2 diesel generators
- Speed: 32.7 knots (60.6 km/h; 37.6 mph)
- Range: 3,920 nmi (7,260 km; 4,510 mi) at 18 knots (33 km/h; 21 mph); 1,345 nmi (2,491 km; 1,548 mi) at 33 knots (61 km/h; 38 mph)
- Complement: 350
- Sensors & processing systems: Radar: Air target acquisition radar, 3 × navigation radars, 130 mm gun fire-control radars, 30 mm air-defence gun fire control radar; Sonar: Active and passive under-keel sonar; ES: Tactical situation plotting board, anti-ship missile fire control system, air defence, missile fire-control system, and torpedo fire control system
- Electronic warfare & decoys: 2 PK-2 decoy dispensers (200 rockets)
- Armament: Guns: 4 (2 × 2) AK-130 130 mm naval guns; 4 × 30 mm AK-630 CIWS; Missiles; 8 (2 × 4) (SS-N-22 'Sunburn') anti-ship missiles; 48 (2 × 24) SA-N-7 'Gadfly' surface-to-air missiles; Anti-submarine: 2 × 2 533 mm torpedo tubes; 2 × 6 RBU-1000 300 mm anti-submarine rocket launchers
- Aircraft carried: 1× Ka-27 series helicopter
- Aviation facilities: Helipad

Nastoychivy is a Sovremenny-class destroyer of the Soviet and later Russian navy. Previously she was named Moskovsky Komsomolets before being renamed on 15 February 1992.

== Development and design ==
The project began in the late 1960s when it was becoming obvious to the Soviet Navy that naval guns still had an important role particularly in support of amphibious landings, but existing gun cruisers and destroyers were showing their age. A new design was started, employing a new 130 mm automatic gun turret.

The ships were 156 metres (512 ft) in length, with a beam of 17.3 metres (56 ft 9 in) and a draught of 6.5 metres (21 ft 4 in).

== Construction and career ==
Moskovsky Komsomolets was laid down on 7 April 1981 and launched on 19 January 1991 by Severnaya Verf in Leningrad. Before her commissioning on 30 December 1992, she was renamed Nastoychivy.

On July 31, 2011, the Navy Day, Russian President Dmitry Medvedev visited the destroyer at the main naval base of the Baltic Fleet in the city of Baltiysk (Kaliningrad region).

As of 2025, Nastoychivy remained the flagship of the Baltic Fleet of the Russian Navy. However, for twenty years of combat service, the destroyer was at sea for a total of about two years and covered more than 70,000 nautical miles.

In recent years, the flagship of the Baltic Fleet did not go on long voyages, going through the restoration of technical readiness in Baltiysk. In 2015, she occasionally took part in naval activities: in March she went to sea during a surprise check of the combat readiness of the Western Military District, in July, she took part in a parade in honor of Navy Day. According to the procurement data of 33 Shipyard, which serves the ships of the Baltic Fleet, the systems of the main power plant (boiler and turbine), life support equipment, and ship armament are being repaired aboard the Nastoichivny.

Since 2019, the destroyer has been undergoing scheduled repairs, during which the propulsion system will be replaced and a number of ship's life support systems will be repaired. In 2025, it was reported that the ship may have been decommissioned or was the process of decommissioning. This report remained to be confirmed.

== Gallery ==
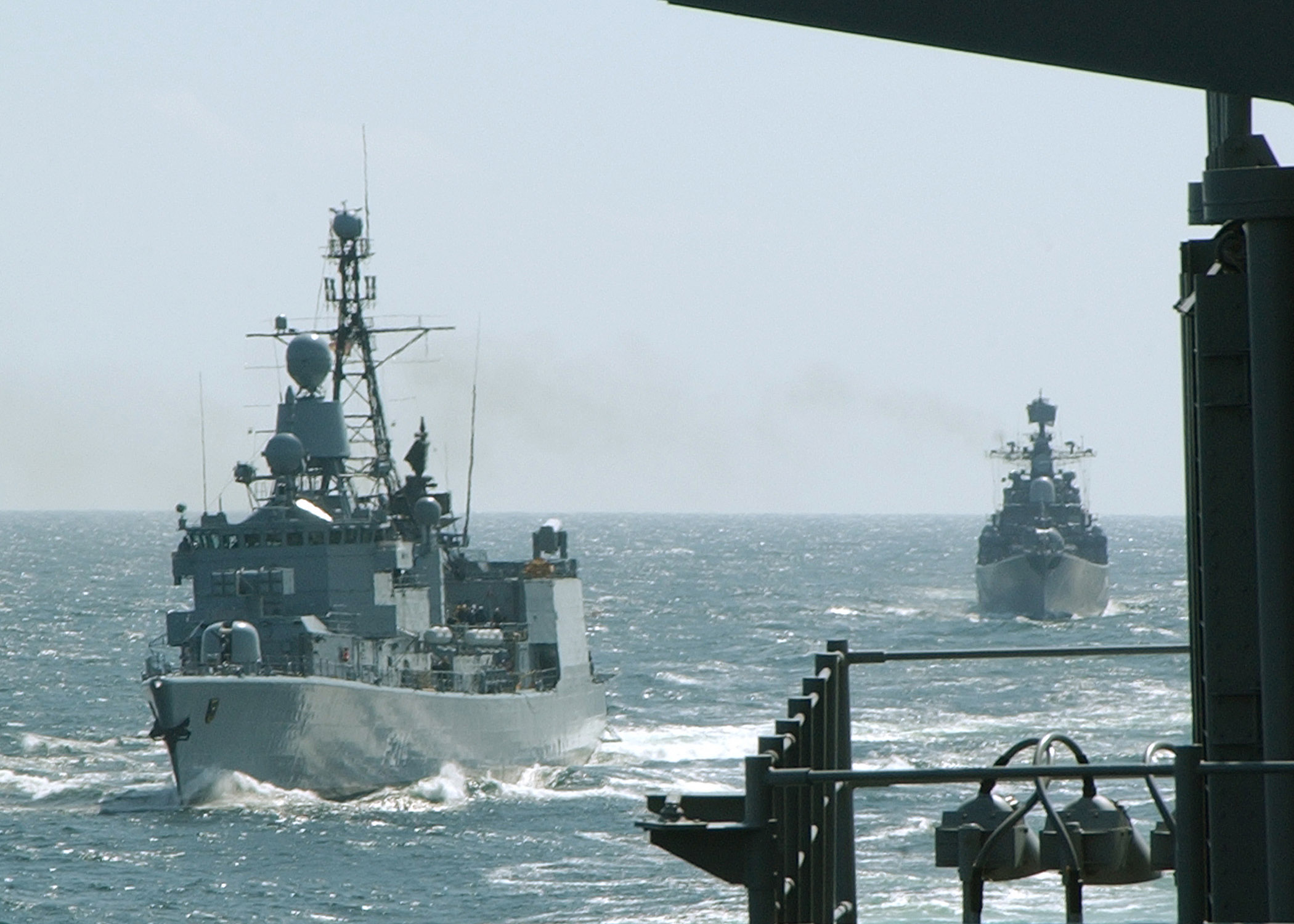
Nastoychivy and Lübeck underway on 9 June 2003.

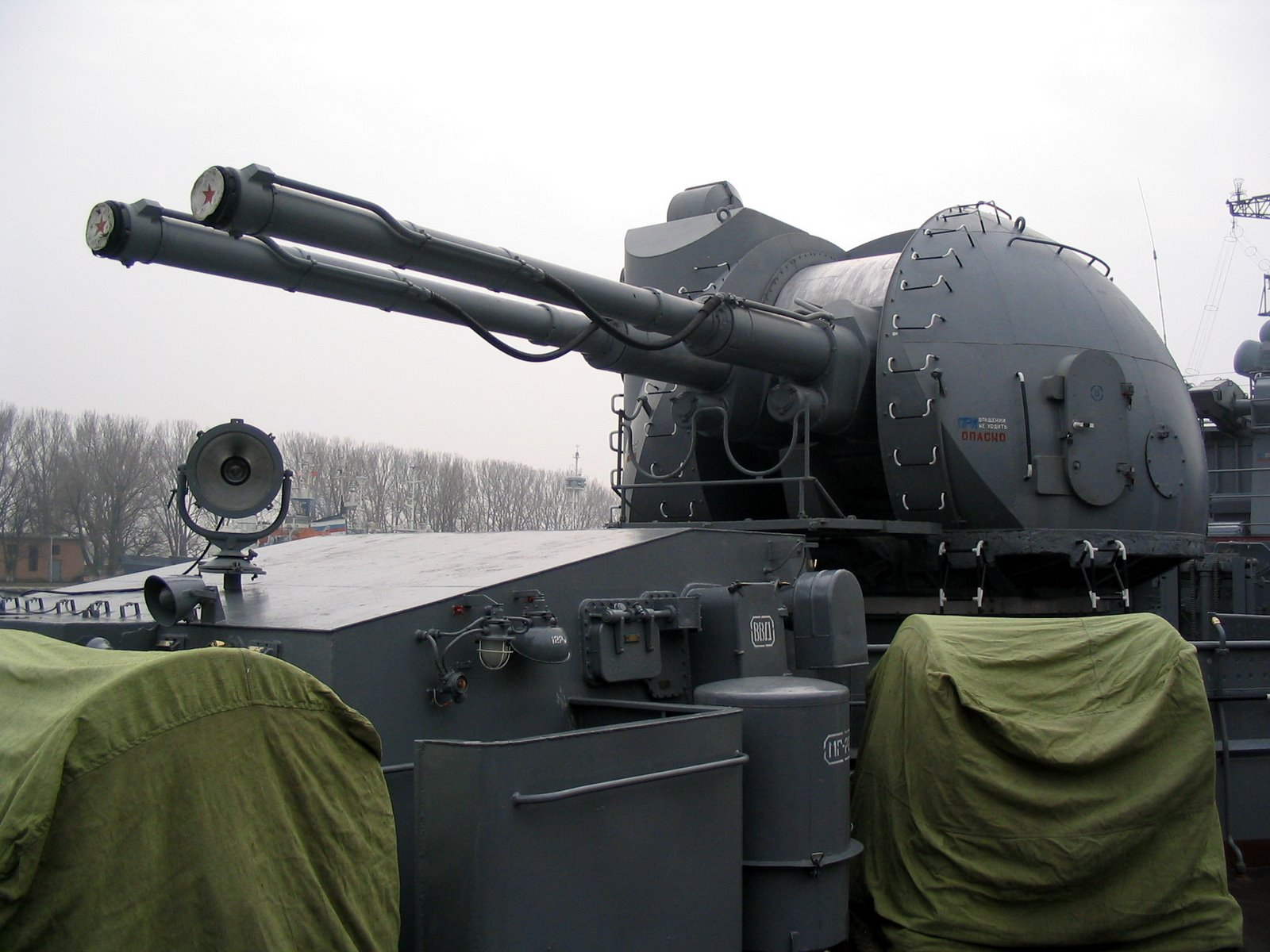
Nastoychivy on 21 February 2008.

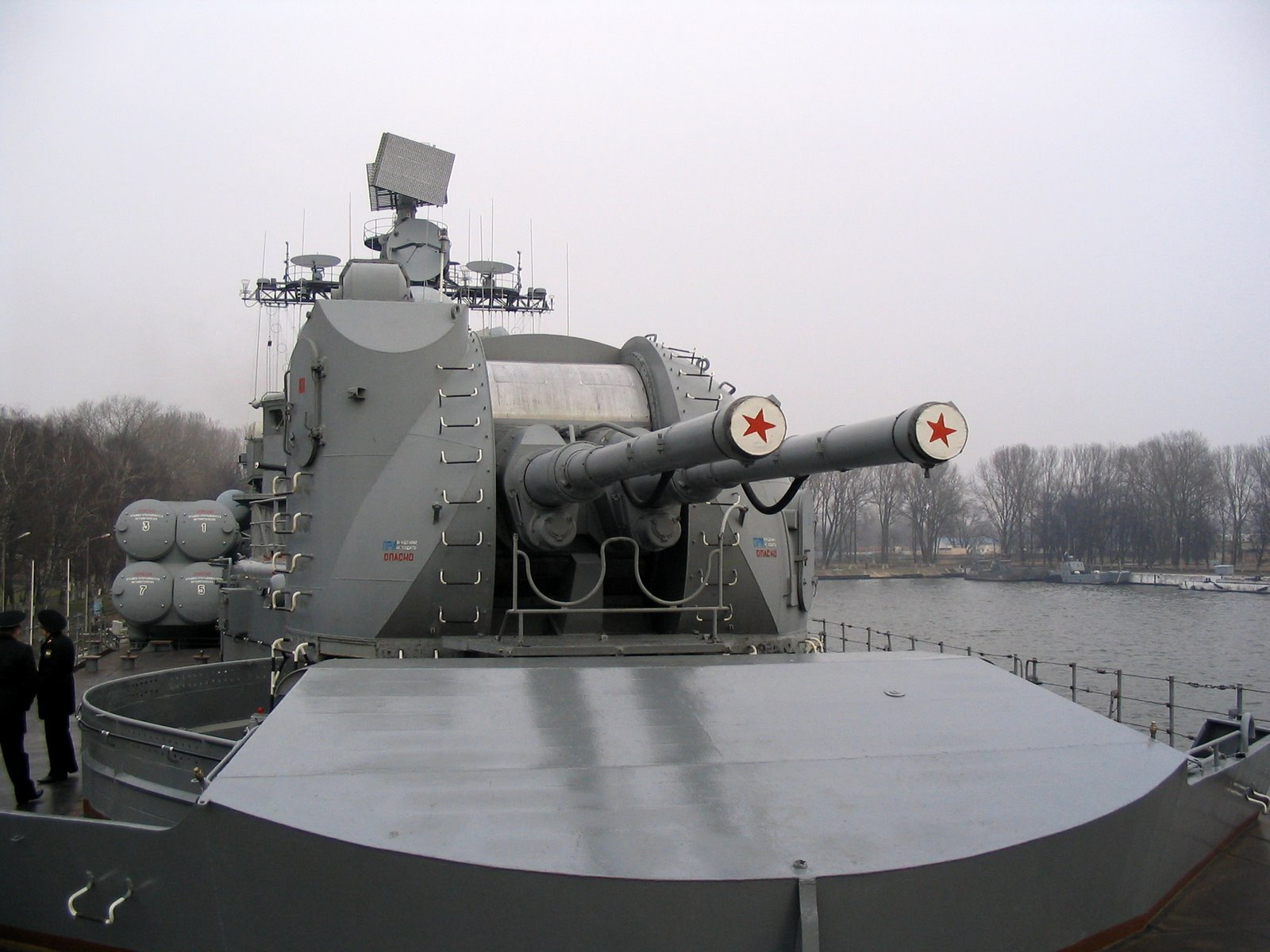
Nastoychivy on 21 February 2008.

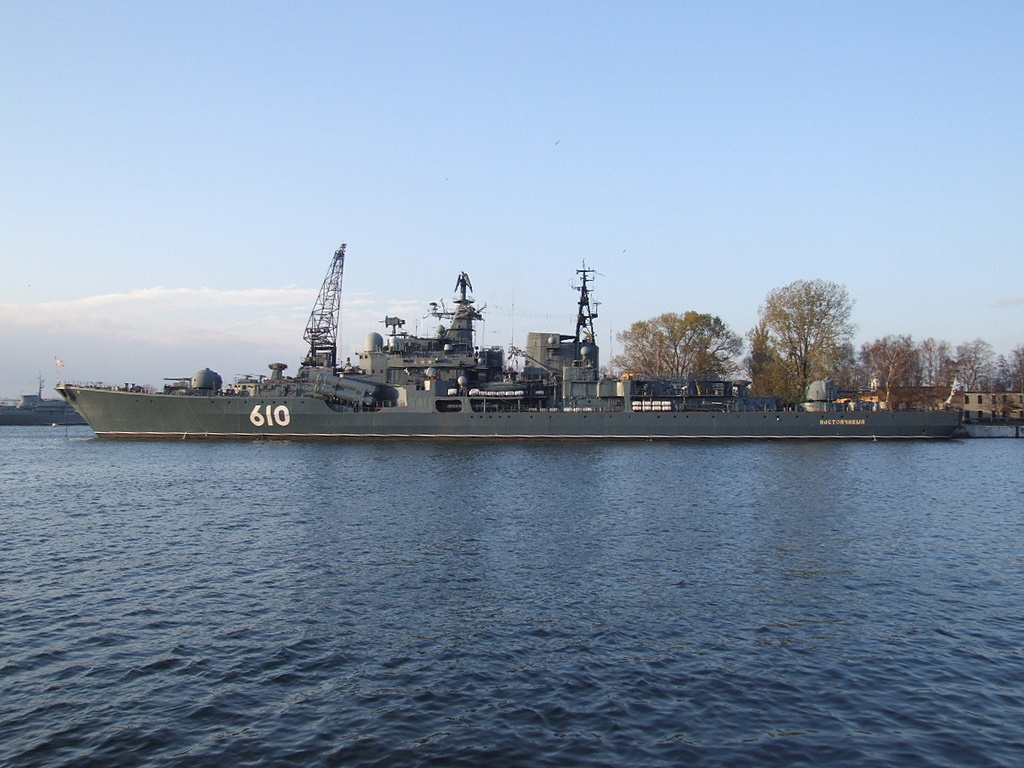
Nastoychivy on 30 October 2008.

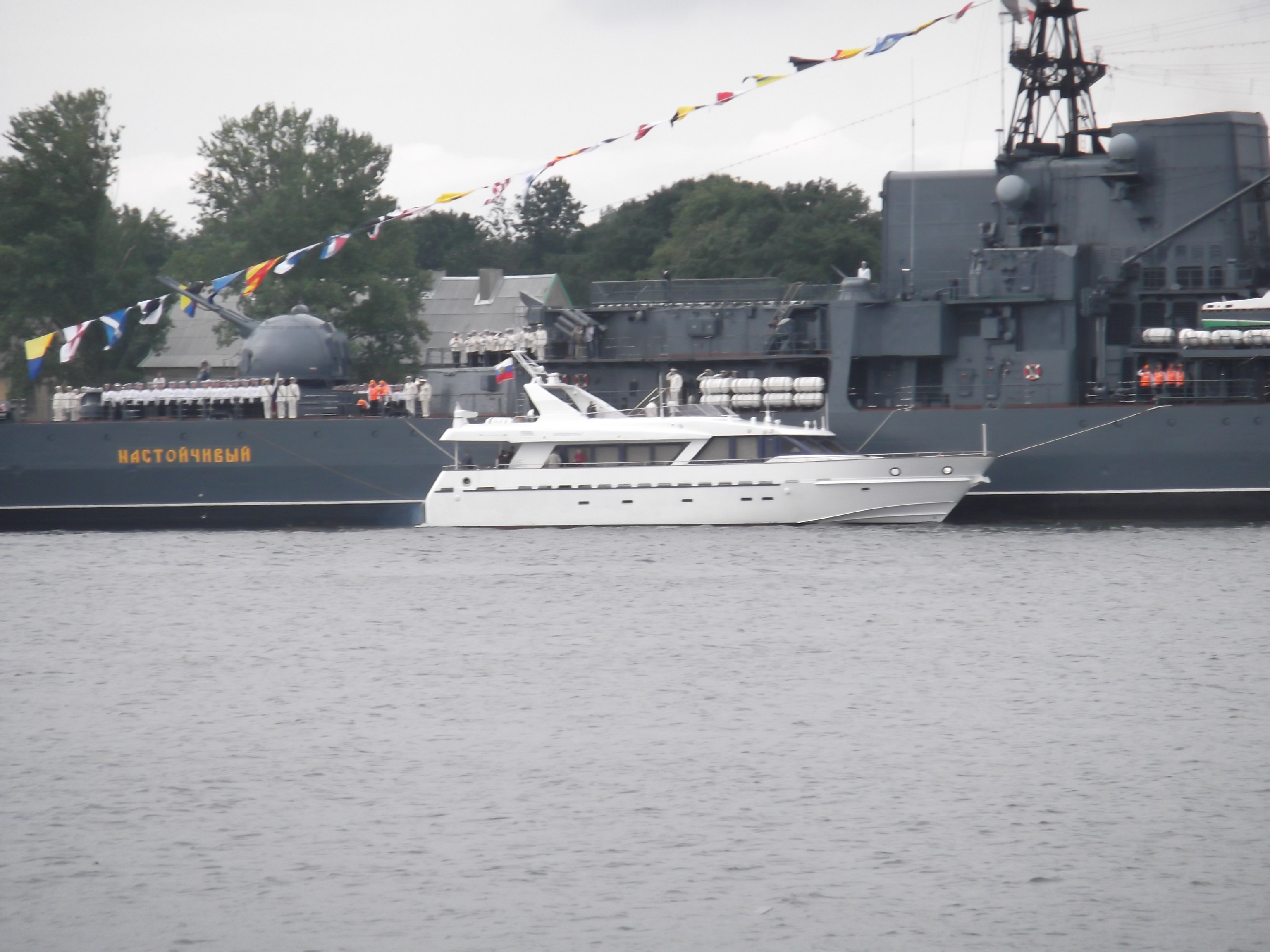
Nastoychivy on 31 July 2011.

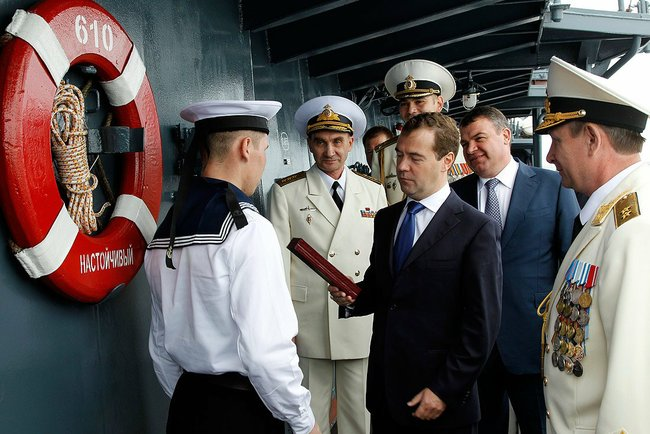
Vladimir Vysotsky and Dmitry Medvedev onboard Nastoychivy on 31 July 2011.

Destroyer Nastoychivy at the point of permanent deployment

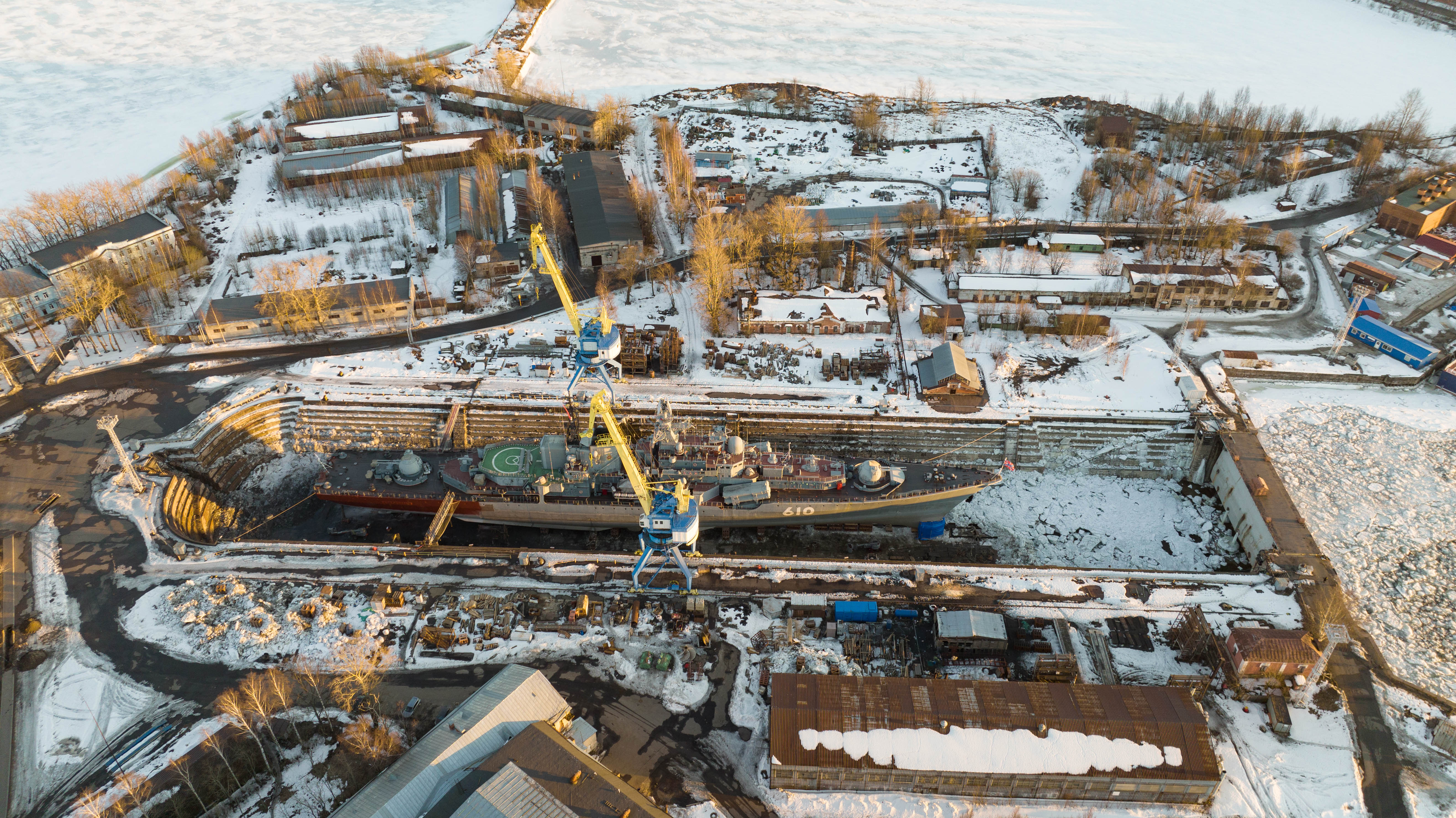
"Nastoychivy" on repairs in Kronstadt
