= Alexander Vekman =

- Александр Карлович Векман
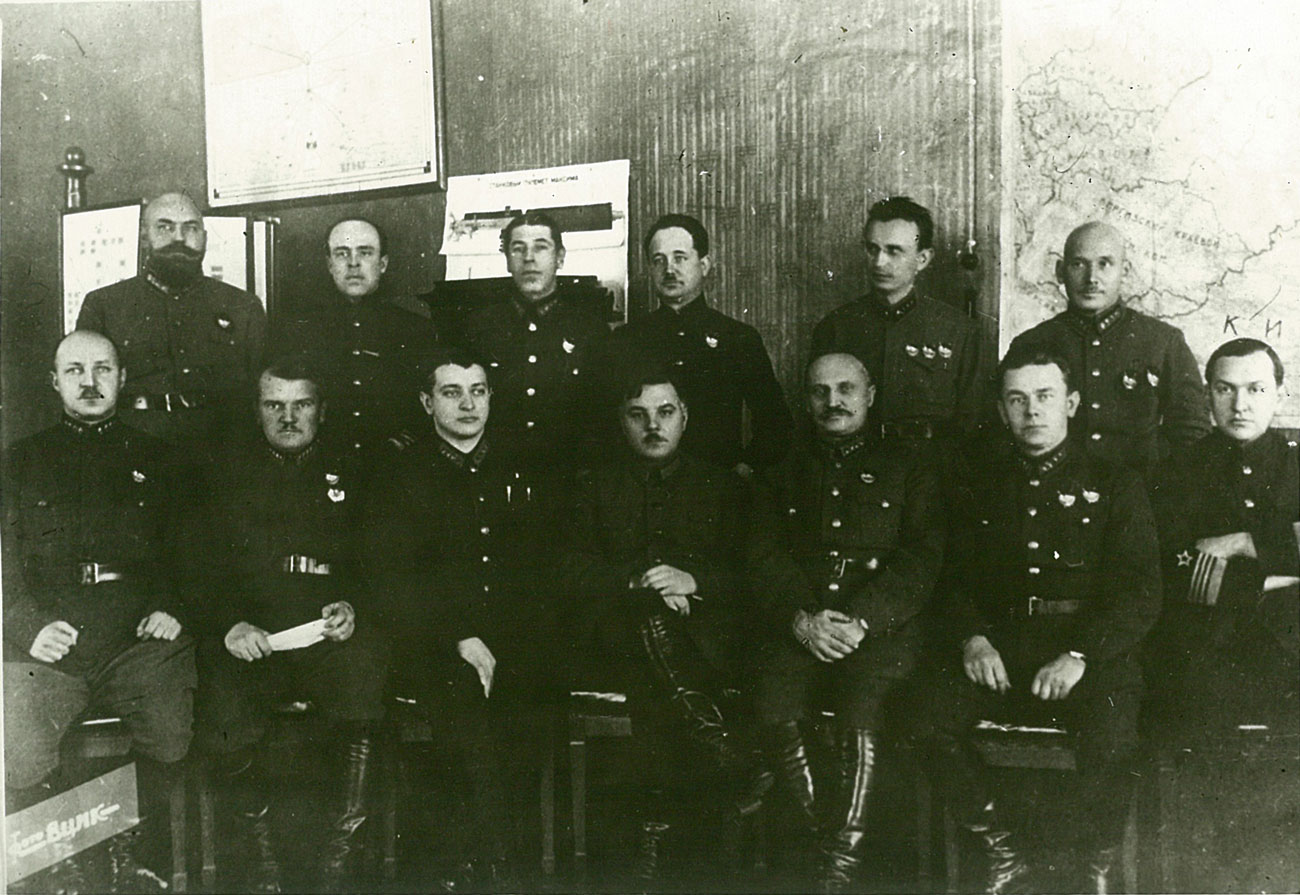
- Meeting of Red Army military district commanders. Vekman is back row, fourth from left.
- Born: July 31, 1884
- Died: April 9, 1955 (aged 70)
- Military career
- Allegiance: Soviet
- Rank: Vice admiral
- Awards: Order of Lenin

Alexander Karlovich Vekman (Russian: Александр Карлович Векман) (July 31, 1884 - April 9, 1955) was a Soviet military leader and vice admiral.

He was commander of the Black Sea Fleet between August 1922 and June 1924. He was also a commander of the Baltic Fleet.

Alexander Vekman was awarded the Order of Lenin, two Orders of the Red Banner, Order of the Patriotic War (1st Class), and numerous medals.
