= Admiral Vladimirsky =

Russian oceanographic ship

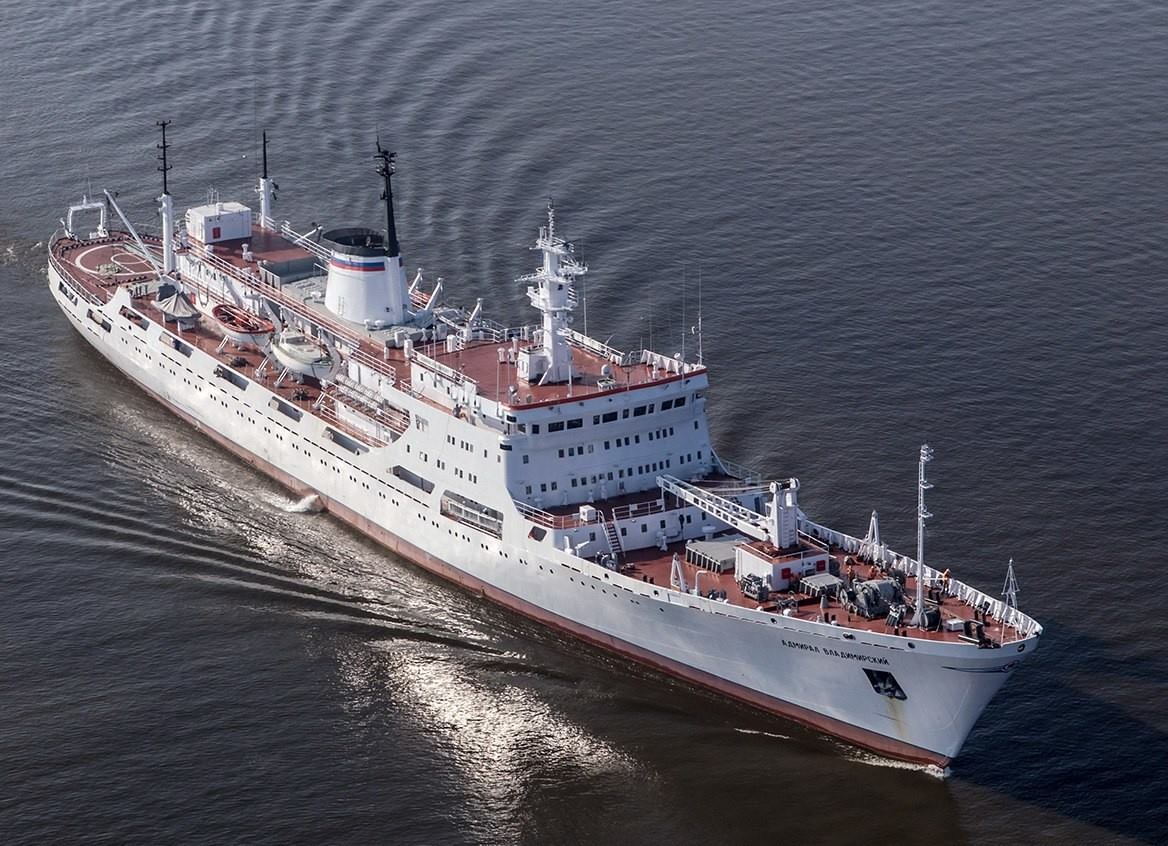
- Admiral Vladimirsky in November 2015.

History

Russia
- Name: Admiral Vladimirsky (Адмирал Владимирский)
- Namesake: Lev Vladimirsky
- Owner: Russia
- Port of registry: Russia
- Builder: Szczecin Shipyard
- Yard number: 852/3
- Laid down: 1 December 1973
- Launched: 4 April 1974
- Christened: 31 May 1975
- Identification: IMO number: 6126797
- Status: In service

General characteristics
- Type: Research vessel
- Displacement: 9,120 tons
- Length: 147.8 m
- Beam: 18.6 m
- Draught: 6.4 m
- Speed: 19.2 knots
- Range: 18,000 mi
- Crew: 170

Admiral Vladimirsky (Russian: Адмирал Владимирский) is a Russian Akademik Krylov-class oceanographic research ship built in 1975. It has been described as a secret spy ship in Western media since 2022. It was named after Admiral Lev Vladimirsky.

The ship was reported active and assigned to the Baltic Fleet as of 2025.
