= Lida-class minesweeper =

Russian Minesweeper

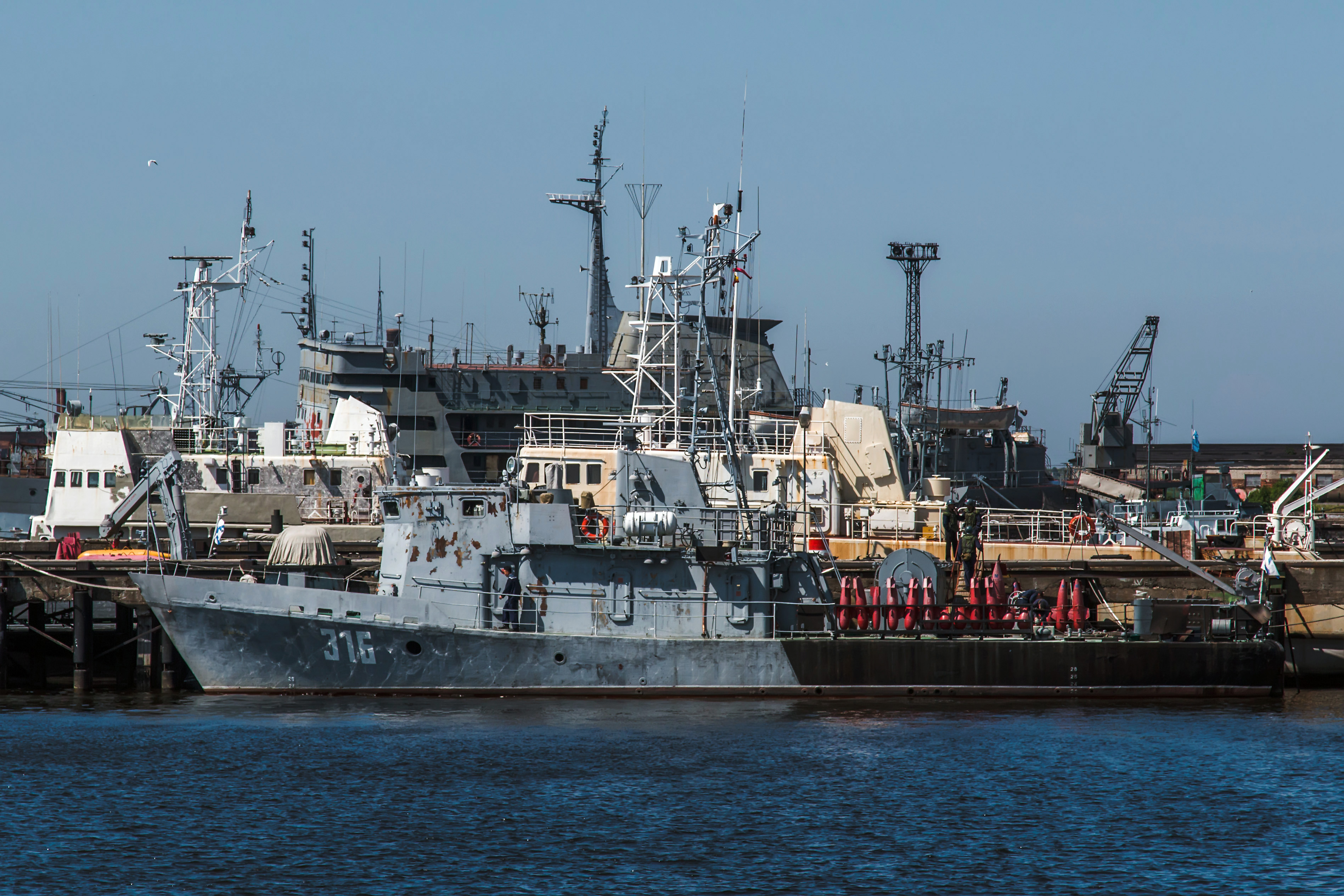
- RT-57, the first unit of project 10750, in Kronstadt in 2014

Class overview
- Name: Lida class
- Builders: Sredne-Nevsky Shipyard
- Operators: Russian Navy
- Built: 1986–1994; 2016-Present
- In service: since 1989
- Planned: 17
- Building: 7
- Completed: 10
- Active: c. 5 or 6 (as of 2026)
- Retired: c. 4

General characteristics
- Type: Minesweeper
- Displacement: 131 tons (standard); 135 tons (full load)
- Length: 31.5 m (103 ft 4 in)
- Beam: 6.5 m (21 ft 4 in)
- Draught: 1.53 m (5 ft 0 in)
- Installed power: 3x300 hp 3D12M diesels; 3x50 kW DGR50M1/1500-2 diesel-generators
- Propulsion: 3 fixed pitch propellers
- Speed: 12 knots (22 km/h)
- Range: 400 nmi (740 km; 460 mi) at 10 knots (19 km/h; 12 mph)
- Endurance: 5 days
- Complement: 14
- Armament: 1 × 6 30 mm AK-630; 2x 9K32 Strela-2 missiles; 4x Mines

The Lida-class minesweeper, Soviet designation Project 10750 Code name: Sapfir (Russian: Сапфир for Sapphire, NATO - designation: Lida) is a class of small minesweeper of the Soviet and Russian navies, which was developed to search for sea mines in port entrances, ports and rivers. Nine vessels were built by the Soviet Union and later by Russia from 1986 for the Russian Navy. Since then, the construction of eight more has started.

== Description ==
=== Hull and sonar ===
The hulls of Project 10750 are made of fiberglass, have a double bottom and are divided into nine watertight compartments.

To search for underwater contacts, a dome with a Kabarga-A1 sonar is built into the hull. On the aft of the ship there is a working platform on which a 5.3-tonne crane is mounted, with which the search robot and minesweeping gear can be brought in and out.

=== Armament ===
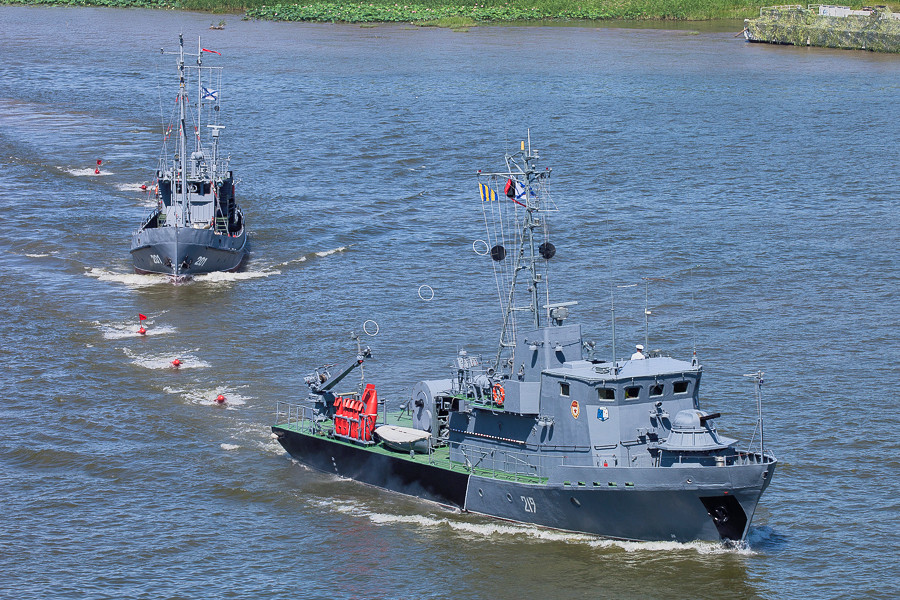
Minesweeper PT-181 Project 10750 with Project 697TB PT-233

The boats are armed with a 30 mm turret AK-306 on the forecastle. In addition, two Strela-2 anti-aircraft missiles can be used against flying targets. Four sea mines along with KIU-1 Luch or KIU-2M Anakonda mine searcher-and-destroyer or GKT-3-MO contact sweep, AT-6 acoustic sweep or SEMT-1 electromagnetic sweep, AT-6 acoustic sweep or 2x200 meters of the detonation cord can be carried.

=== Export ===
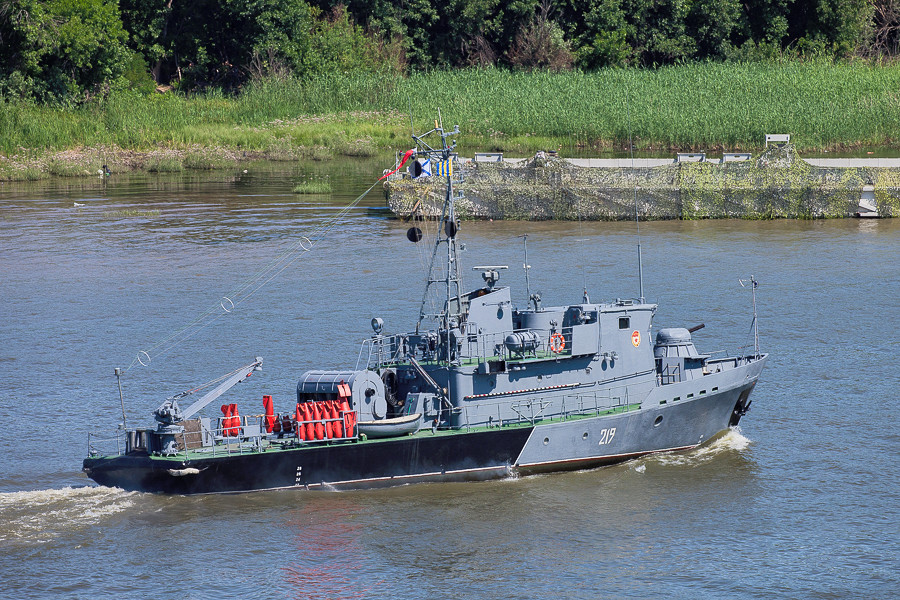
Minesweeper PT-219 Project 10750

In addition to project 10750, the variant Project 10750E MCM was planned for export to Kazakhstan, of which at least one boat was built. The boats are equipped with two 380 hp (280 kW) MAN D2866 diesels instead of the three engines on the Russian boats, have only two propellers, carry different sensors and communication equipment and are equipped with two 12.7 mm Kord machine guns armed.

== Whereabouts ==
Nine Project 10750 boats were completed for the Russian Navy by 1996; the construction of six boats is said to have started since then. Originally 26 ships were planned, but were never started due to financing problems. Two boats were decommissioned up to 2014.

As of 2026, about five or six Lida-class vessels were believed to remain in service with the Russian navy. One report indicates that RT-57 (in service with the Baltic Fleet) may have decommissioned in 2026.

== See also ==
- List of active Russian Navy ships
- List of ships of Russia by project number
- List of minesweeper classes

== Literature ==
- Ю.В.Апальков: Корабли ВМФ СССР. Том IV - Десантные и минно-тральные корабли. Saint Petersburg, 2007, ISBN 978-5-8172-0135-2. (in Russian)
