= Lev Galler =

Soviet military leader (1883–1950)

Lev Mikhailovich Galler
- Born: Leo Julius Alexander Philipp von Haller; 29 November [O.S. 17 November] 1883; St Petersburg, Russia
- Died: 12 July 1950 (aged 66); Soviet Union
- Military career
- Allegiance: Russian Empire; Soviet Union
- Branch: Imperial Russian Navy; Soviet Navy
- Service years: 1905–1948
- Rank: Admiral
- Commands: Baltic Fleet
- Conflicts: World War I Estonian War of Independence; Russian Civil War

Lev Mikhailovich Galler (Born Leo Julius Alexander Philipp von Haller; Russian: Лев Михайлович Галлер; 29 November [O.S. 17 November] 1883 – 12 July 1950) was a Soviet military leader and admiral of Baltic German origin.

Galler was born into a Baltic German family of a military engineer Philipp Michael Hugo von Haller (Galler) and joined the Baltic Fleet on completing the Naval school in 1905. During World War I he was squadron gunnery officer of the Battleship Division, executive officer of the Slava and commanded the destroyer Turkmenets Stavropolski. After the October Revolution he joined the Bolsheviks and participated in the Ice Cruise of the Baltic Fleet. Subsequently, he commanded the destroyer Mecheslav, the battleship Andrei Pervozvanny and was subsequently chief of staff of the Baltic Fleet during the British Campaign in the Baltic 1918–1919.

After the Civil War, Galler was commander of the Baltic Fleet's battleship division and commanded the Baltic Fleet from 1932 to 1937. In 1938 he became chief of naval staff and in 1940 he became Deputy Commissar for the Navy responsible for naval construction. In 1947 he was head of the Naval Academy.

Galler was arrested in 1948 and imprisoned. He died in custody in 1950 and was rehabilitated in 1953.

== Honours and awards ==
Soviet Union

- Three Orders of Lenin
- Four Orders of the Red Banner
- Two Order of Ushakov, 1st class
- Order of the Red Star
- Medal "For the Victory over Germany in the Great Patriotic War 1941–1945"
- Jubilee Medal "XX Years of the Workers' and Peasants' Red Army"

Russian Empire

- Order of St. Stanislaus, 2nd class with Swords (1916) and 3rd class (1909)
- Order of St. Anna, 3rd class (1913)

Poland

- Cross of Grunwald, 1st class
