= Russian frigate Shtandart =

Ship of the Baltic fleet, 1703–27

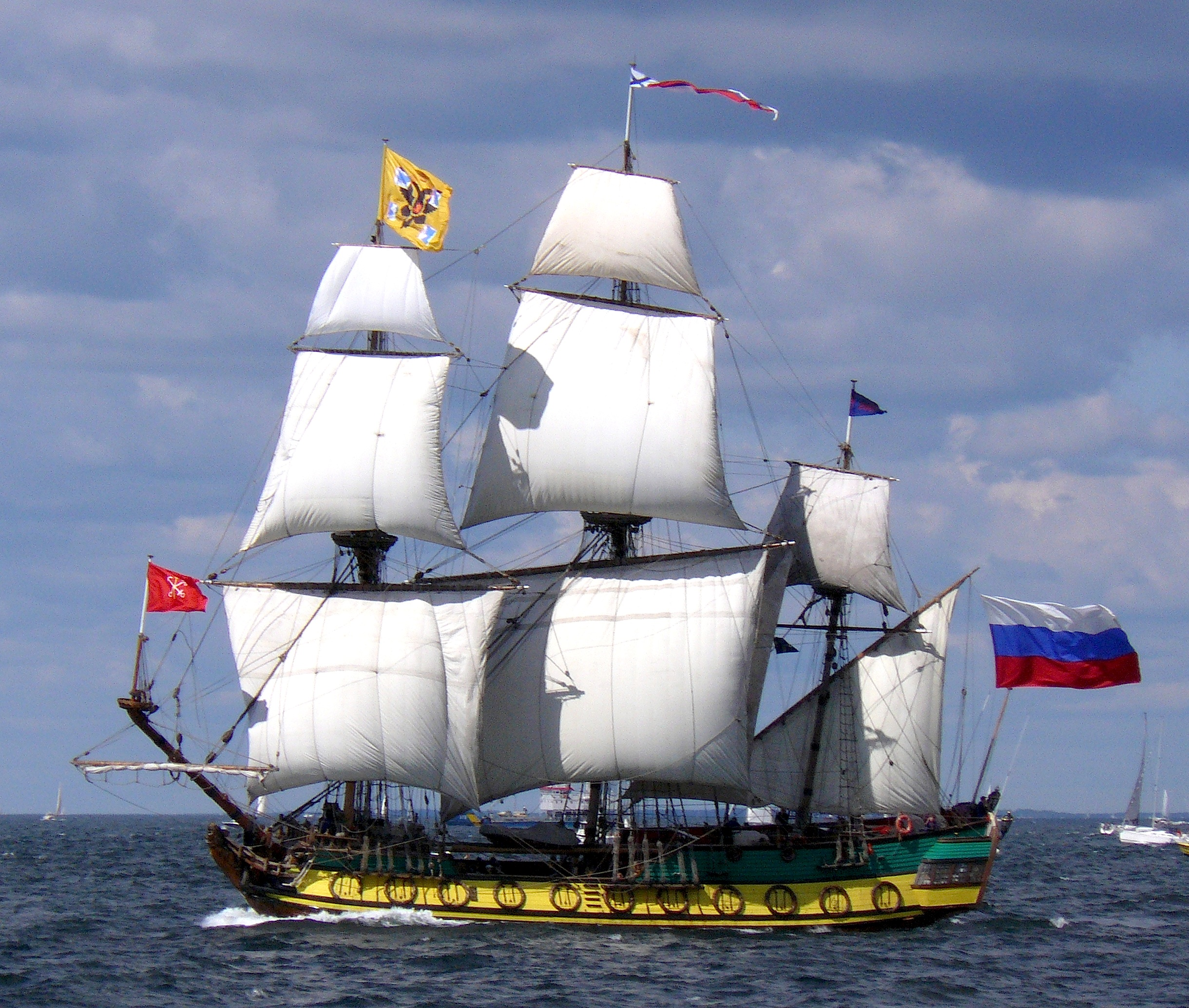
- The modern replica Shtandart (1999) under sail in the Baltic Sea, 2007

History

Russian Empire
- Name: Shtandart
- Namesake: Imperial Yacht ship,
- Owner: Imperial Russian Navy
- Ordered: 1703
- Builder: Shipyard of Olonets city
- Laid down: April 24, 1703
- Launched: August 22, 1703
- Acquired: September 8, 1703
- Commissioned: September 8, 1703
- Decommissioned: 1727
- In service: 1710
- Out of service: 1711
- Fate: Broken up

General characteristics (typical)
- Class & type: 24-gun (28-gun after 1710 refit) three-masted frigate
- Displacement: 220 tons
- Length: 34.5 m (113 ft) (Overall), 25.0 m (82.0 ft) (Deck centreline)
- Beam: 6.9 m (23 ft)
- Height: 33 m (108 ft) mainmast
- Draft: 3.3 m (11 ft)
- Decks: Berth, Gun, Spar
- Propulsion: Sail (three masts, ship rig),
- Sail plan: 620 m^{2} (6,700 sq ft) on three masts
- Speed: 11 knots (20 km/h)
- Complement: 1703: 120 seamen,
- Armament: 24 guns (after 1710 28 guns)

The frigate Shtandart (Russian: Штандартъ) was the first ship of Russia's Baltic fleet. Her keel was laid on April 24, 1703, at the Olonetsky shipyard near Olonets by the decree of Tsar Peter I and orders issued by commander Aleksandr Menshikov. The vessel was built by the Dutch shipwright Vybe Gerens under the direct supervision of the tsar. She was the first flagship of the Imperial Russian Navy and was in service until 1727. The name Shtandart was also given to the royal yachts of the tsars until the Russian Revolution in 1917. Tsar Nicholas II's royal yacht was last of this series.

The replica frigate has three masts and her displacement is 220 tons. She is 25 metres (82 feet) long at her centre line, 27.5 metres (90 feet) long on deck and 34.5 metres (113 feet) long overall. The Shtandart is 6.9 metres (23 feet) wide with a draft of 3.3 metres (11 feet). The ship is designed for speeds between 8-9 knots under sail, and under auxiliary engines required by modern standards up to 15 knots (28 km/h). The original crew complement in 1703 was between 120 and 150, and the modern crew consists of 30 trainees and 10 officers.

== The first Shtandart (1703) ==
The name Shtandart signifies Peter the Great's desire to gain access to the Baltic Sea, which at the time of the Shtandart's construction was dominated by the Swedish Empire. A plan to take control of the Baltic Sea away from Sweden was revived after Peter's Grand Embassy ended in 1698. The name refers more directly to a naval ensign created for the new Baltic Fleet, of which the Shtandart was the first ship. Peter's goal was finally realized after he decisively defeated Swedish forces at the Battle of Poltava in 1709, a turning point for Russia in the Great Northern War (1700–1721).

The Shtandart's design combined techniques from English and Dutch shipbuilding schools. The frame of the ship is wide, almost square, and the ship's double bottom is flat, reducing the draft. The high rigging of the sails is in the English style. The frigate was launched on August 22, 1703, and set sail on September 8, 1703, for St. Petersburg to be baptised.

=== The Shtandart and Peter I ===
The Shtandart was built in only five months, and Tsar Peter I's personal involvement may have expedited the construction. Peter had learned shipbuilding techniques from the Dutch during his Grand Embassy tour of western Europe (1697–98), and he sailed on the Shtandart as its captain under the pseudonym Peter Mihajlov on its maiden voyage from Olonets to Saint Petersburg in September 1703.

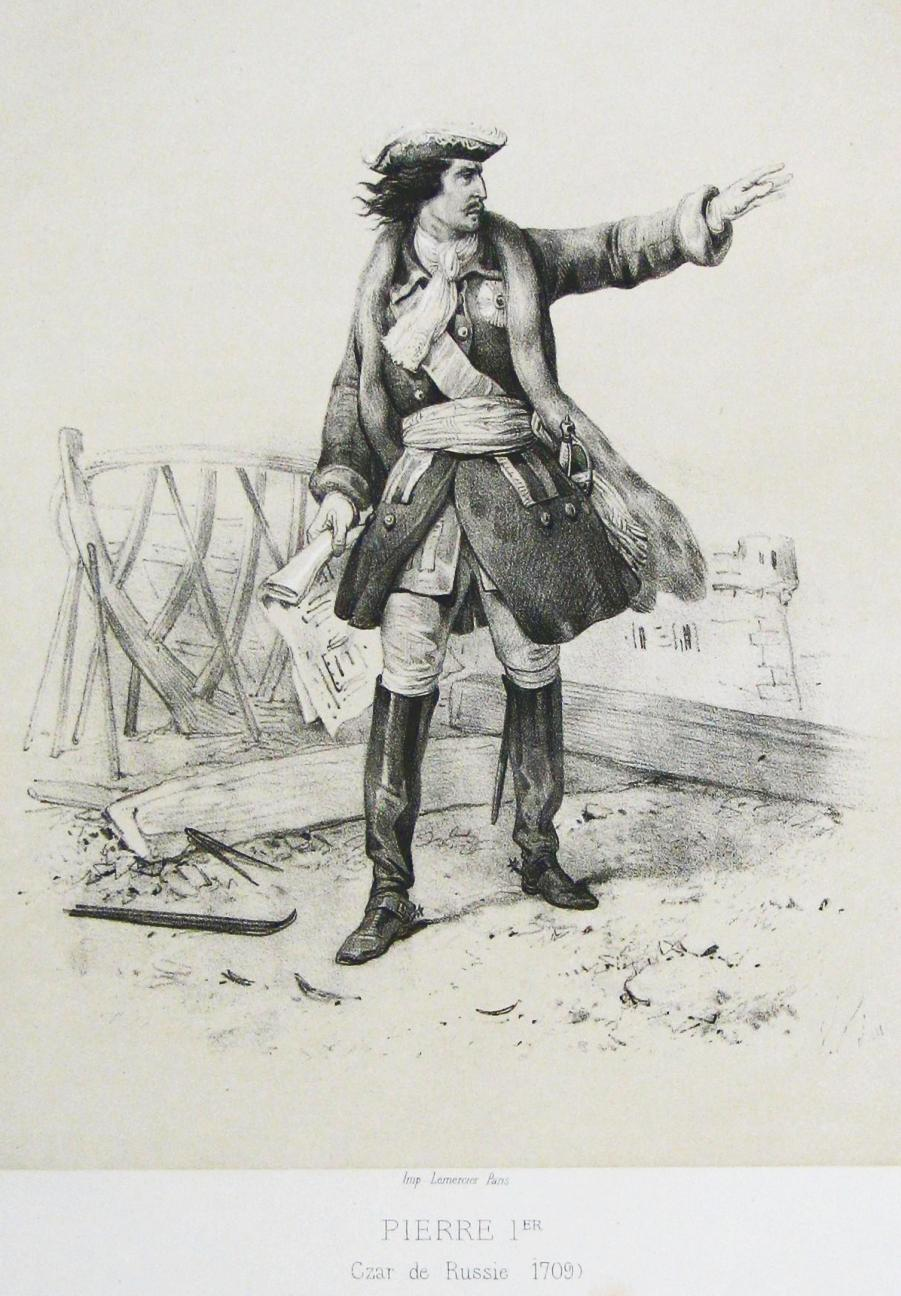
Emperor Peter I at a shipyard (Lemersoue 1709)

In the great cabin there is a compass hanging over a table which can only be read from its underside. A Russian legend relates that this compass hung over Peter's hammock and that when he woke up, he always checked the compass to ensure that the frigate was on course.

=== Repairs and breakup ===
The Shtandart was overhauled in 1710 and four cannons were added to her armament, making her a 28-gun frigate. The ship was laid up in drydock in 1711 to have several beams replaced. In 1727 Catherine I ordered a survey of the frigate to determine if she was sound enough for another refit. During an attempt to raise the ship above the waterline, the hull was cut in half by cables used in the process. The Shtandart was broken up, and Catherine ordered a replacement to be built. This order was finally carried out in 1994.

== The modern replica (1999) ==
In 1994 a small group of sailing enthusiasts led by Vladimir Martus started construction of a replica of the ship. Martus developed a new layout of the Shtandart wherein she was built with four bulkheads, dividing her into five compartments. The "Shtandart Project" (a non-commercial organisation dedicated to youth development) launched a replica of the frigate on September 4, 1999.
