= Donskoye, Svetlogorsky District, Kaliningrad Oblast =

Donskoye Донско́е
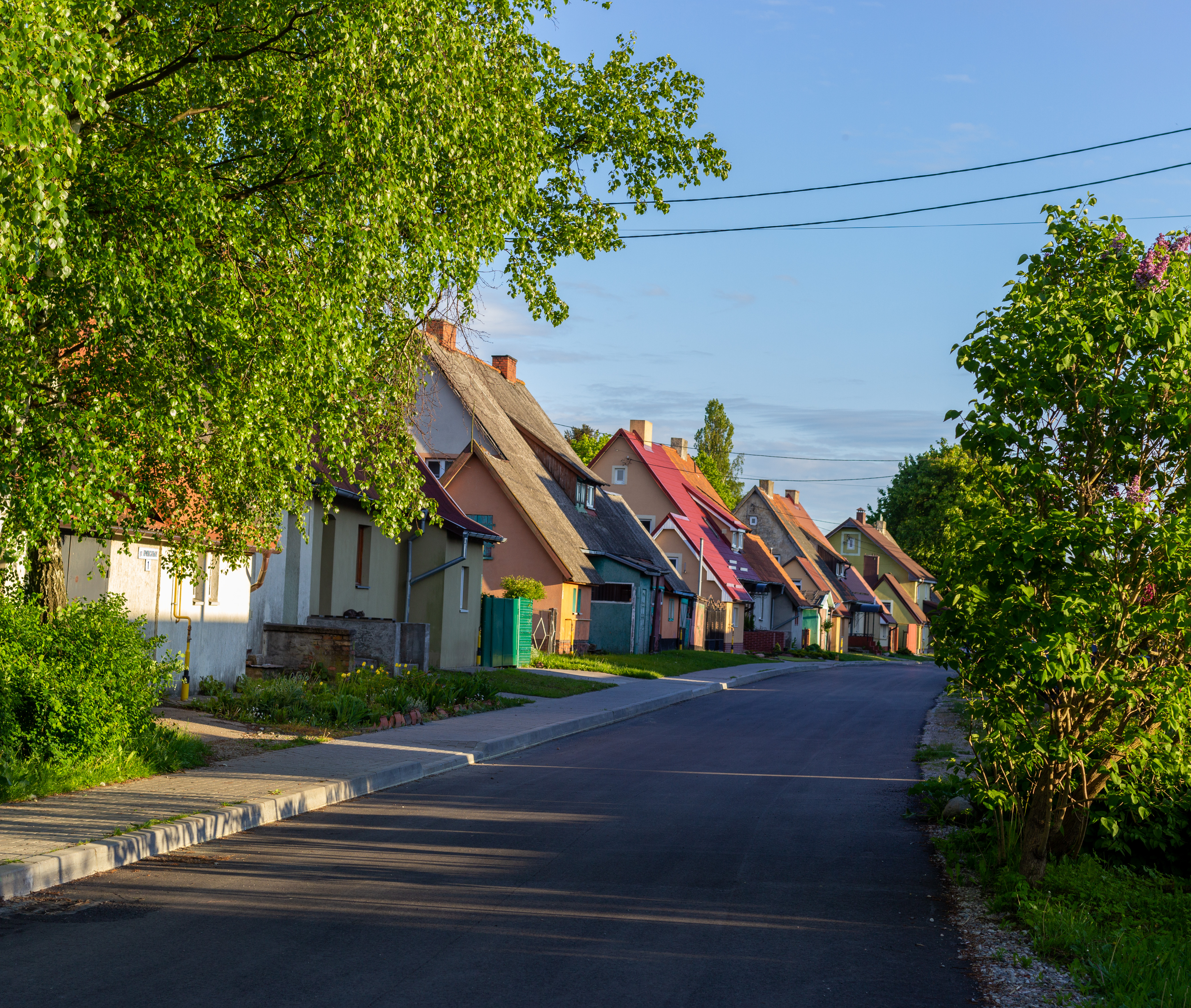
- Interactive map of Donskoye
- Location of Donskoye Donskoye (European Russia) Donskoye (Russia)
- Coordinates: 54°46′14″N 19°58′3″E
- Country: Russia
- Federal subject: Kaliningrad Oblast

Population (2010 Census)
  - Total: 2,924
  - Estimate (2018): 2,795 (−4.4%)
- Time zone: UTC+2 (MSK–1)
- Postal code: 238570
- OKTMO ID: 27634102101

Donskoye (Russian: Донско́е, German: Groß-Dirschkeim, Lithuanian: Diržkaimis, Polish: Tryszkajmy) is an urban locality (an urban-type settlement) in Svetlogorsky District of Kaliningrad Oblast, Russia. Population: 2,924 (2010 census); 3,170 (2002 census);
