= Khrabrovo =

Khrabrovo (Russian: Храброво) is the name of several rural localities in Russia:

- Khrabrovo, Ivanovo Oblast, a village in Ivanovsky District of Ivanovo Oblast
- Khrabrovo, Kaliningrad Oblast, a settlement in Khrabrovsky Rural Okrug of Guryevsky District of Kaliningrad Oblast
- Khrabrovo, Dmitrovsky District, Moscow Oblast, a selo under the administrative jurisdiction of the Town of Yakhroma in Dmitrovsky District of Moscow Oblast
- Khrabrovo, Mozhaysky District, Moscow Oblast, a village in Zamoshinskoye Rural Settlement of Mozhaysky District of Moscow Oblast
- Khrabrovo, Ozyorsky District, Moscow Oblast, a village in Klishinskoye Rural Settlement of Ozyorsky District of Moscow Oblast
- Khrabrovo, Taldomsky District, Moscow Oblast, a village in Yermolinskoye Rural Settlement of Taldomsky District of Moscow Oblast
