= Parusnoye, Voronezh Oblast =

Parusnoye Парусное
- Selo
- Location within Voronezh Oblast Location within European Russia Location within Russia
- Coordinates: 51°35′N 39°31′E
- Country: Russia
- Region: Voronezh Oblast
- District: Novousmansky District
- Time zone: UTC+3:00

Parusnoye (Russian: Парусное) is a rural locality (a selo) in Usmanskoye 2-ye Rural Settlement, Novousmansky District, Voronezh Oblast, Russia. The population was 920 as of 2010. There are 11 streets.

== Geography ==
Parusnoye is located on the Tamlyk River, 15 km southeast of Novaya Usman (the district's administrative centre) by road. Podkletnoye is the nearest rural locality.
