= Sergei Lipilin =

Russian Navy officer (born 1965)

Sergei Vladimirovich Lipilin
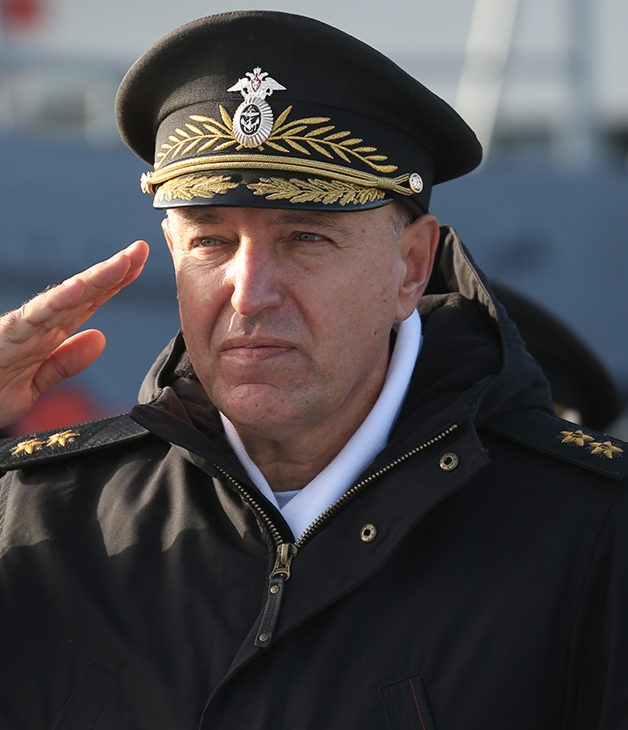
- Born: 28 August 1965 (age 61); Nizhneudinsk, Irkutsk Oblast, Russian SFSR, USSR
- Military career
- Allegiance: USSR; Russia
- Branch: Soviet Navy; Russian Navy
- Service years: 1982-present
- Rank: Vice-Admiral
- Commands: Bezboyaznenny; Bystry; Varyag; 30th Division of Surface Ships; Northeastern Group of Troops and Forces; Baltic Fleet
- Awards: Order of Military Merit; Order of Naval Merit; Medal of the Order "For Merit to the Fatherland" Second Class

Sergei Vladimirovich Lipilin (Russian: Сергей Владимирович Липилин; born 28 August 1965) is an officer of the Russian Navy. He currently holds the rank of Vice-Admiral, and has been commander in chief of the Baltic Fleet since 2024.

== Biography ==
Lipilin was born on 28 August 1965 in Nizhneudinsk, Irkutsk Oblast, in what was then the Russian Soviet Federative Socialist Republic, in the Soviet Union. He entered the Soviet Navy, studying at the Pacific Higher Naval School in Vladivostok, graduating from its mine and torpedo faculty in 1987. He was assigned to the Pacific Fleet, where he served on several Krivak-class frigates assigned to the fleet's missile ship brigade in Kamchatka, alternately the Retivyy, Rezkiy, Razumnyy and Letuchnyy. During Lipilin's service on these ships, he rose from the position of commander of the mine and torpedo warhead control group to the ship's commander's senior assistant. By 1995 he was serving as assistant to the commander of the Slava-class missile cruiser Varyag, moving with her when she was transferred from Kamchatka to and assigned to the 36th Surface Ship Division of the Primorsky Flotilla. Following this posting Lipilin held various command and staff positions in the Primorsky Flotilla's surface ship division, becoming deputy chief of staff of the formation. He commanded the Sovremenny-class destroyers Bezboyaznenny and Bystry, followed by the cruiser Varyag, becoming chief of staff of the surface ship division, and in 2008, its commander.

Lipilin carried out further studies at the Kuznetsov Naval Academy, graduating in 2002. In 2009 he took command of the Black Sea Fleet's 30th Division of Surface Ships, a post he held until 2010, when he entered the Military Academy of the General Staff. Graduating from the academy in 2012, on 8 August that year he was appointed chief of staff and first deputy commander of the Northeastern Group of Troops and Forces. In 2014, he led a detachment of ships of the Pacific Fleet at the international Russian-Chinese exercises Peace Mission 2014. In September 2014, Lipilin was appointed to command the formation. He was promoted to rear admiral on 11 June 2015. In January 2018 he was appointed deputy commander of the Black Sea Fleet, before becoming chief of staff and first deputy commander of the Baltic Fleet in March 2021. He held this position until 8 July 2024, when he succeeded Vladimir Vorobyov as commander of the Baltic Fleet.

== Honours and awards ==
Over his career Lipilin has received the Orders of Military Merit, Naval Merit, the Medal of the Order "For Merit to the Fatherland" Second Class and various other medals.
