= Aleksandr Nosatov =

Russian admiral (b. 1963)

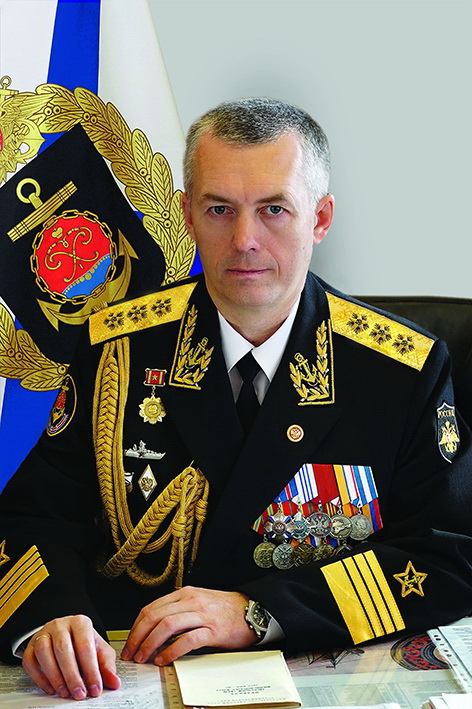
- Nosatov in 2016
- Born: 27 March 1963 (age 63); Sevastopol, Ukrainian SSR, USSR
- Military career
- Allegiance: Soviet Union (to 1991); Russia
- Branch: Soviet Navy; Russian Navy
- Service years: 1981–2024
- Rank: Admiral
- Commands: Baltic Fleet
- Awards: Order of Military Merit; Order of Naval Merit

Admiral Aleksandr Mikhailovich Nosatov (Note: Russian: Александр Михайлович Носатов) (born 27 March 1963) is a retired Russian Navy officer who was Chief of the Main Staff and First Deputy Commander-in-Chief of the Navy from 2021 to 2024.

Born in Sevastopol, Nosatov's initial service was with the Soviet Navy's Pacific Fleet during the last years of the Soviet Union. He remained in the navy after its formation as a Russian military force, rising through the ranks and serving in a number of posts in the Pacific Fleet. Following studies at the Naval Academy, he took command of his own ship in 2000. Various staff appointments followed, before Nosatov transferred to the Black Sea Fleet as its deputy commander, and then chief of staff, in the early 2010s. He briefly became head of the Naval Academy in 2016, shortly before a purge of the Baltic Fleet's higher echelons that year. Having served for only just over a month as head of the academy, Nosatov was appointed acting commander of the Baltic Fleet, and subsequently confirmed in the post later that year. He was promoted to admiral in 2018, and has received several awards and decorations over his career.

== Early life and education ==
Nosatov was born on 27 March 1963 in Sevastopol, then part of the Ukrainian SSR, in the Soviet Union. He studied at the P. S. Nakhimov Black Sea Higher Naval School, graduating in 1985.

== Naval career ==
His early officer service was spent with the Pacific Fleet, as a lieutenant engineer in the laboratory of the coastal base maintenance workshop. Between 1986 and 1989 he commanded an anti-aircraft missile battery aboard the Sovremenny-class destroyer Stoykiy. Nosatov then went on to serve as commander of missile and artillery combat aboard the destroyer Bezboyaznenny and from 1991 was assistant to the flagship missile specialist of the 35th missile ship division. From 1993 Nosatov was commander of the Bezboyaznenny's missile weapons. In 1994 he became the flagship specialist in missile weapons for the 36th division of missile ships, and from 1997 to 1998 was the senior officer to the commander of the Slava-class cruiser Varyag.

Nosatov studied at the N. G. Kuznetsov Naval Academy, graduating in 2000, and then took over his own command, that of the Pacific Fleet destroyer Bystryy. From 2002 to 2007 Nosatov was chief of staff and commander of the 36th division of surface ships. In 2006 he was promoted to rear-admiral by presidential decree. Nosatov undertook further studies, this time at the Military Academy of the General Staff of the Armed Forces of Russia, which he left in 2009. In 2009 he was appointed commander of the naval base at Baltiysk, and on 27 January 2012 he was appointed deputy commander of the Black Sea Fleet. He held this post until 2013, when he became the fleet's chief of staff. On 5 May 2014 he was promoted to vice admiral, by decree of the Russian president.

From 17 May 2016 he was briefly head of the Naval Academy.

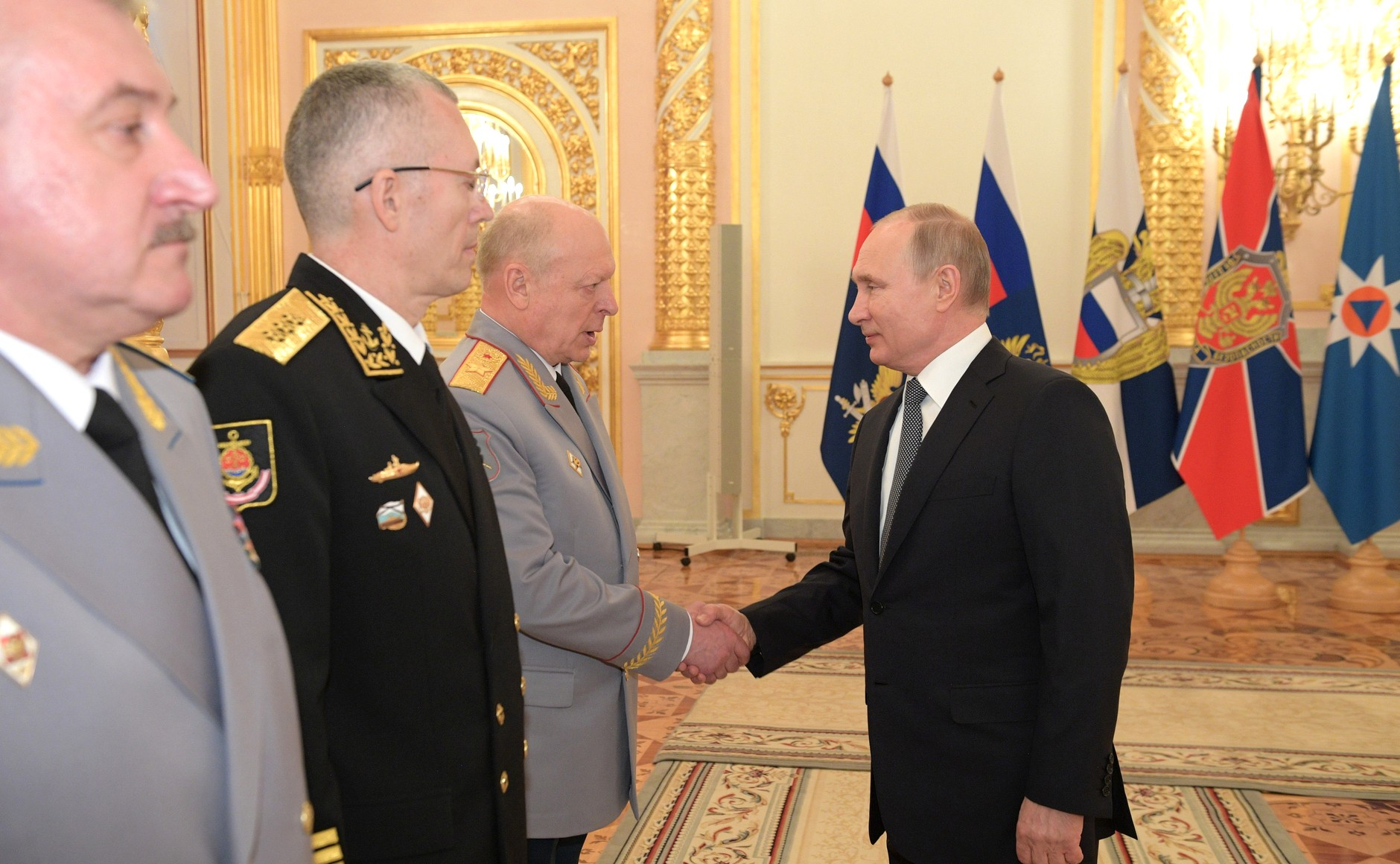
11 April 2019, Russian President Vladimir Putin meeting with senior military leaders. Nosatov stands beside Oleg Salyukov, seen shaking Putin's hand

On 30 June 2016, after one and a half months as head of the academy, Nosatov was appointed acting commander of the Baltic Fleet, replacing Vice-Admiral Viktor Kravchuk who was dismissed for "serious omissions in the organization of combat training, the daily activities of the troops, as well as distortions in the reports of the true state of affairs." Some fifty senior officers in the fleet were dismissed, briefly leaving Vice-Admiral Sergei Yeliseyev, a former deputy commander of the Ukrainian Navy prior to his defection to Russia during the Russian annexation of Crimea, as senior officer of the Baltic Fleet, before Nosatov took up his post. Nosatov was subsequently confirmed in his post by presidential decree on 17 September 2016. On 18 October 2016 he was presented with the ceremonial standard of the fleet. Nosatov was promoted to admiral on 12 December 2018. On 5 October 2021 Nosatov was appointed to the post of Chief of Staff and First Deputy Commander-in-Chief of the Russian Navy. His replacement as commander of the Baltic Fleet was Vice-Admiral Viktor Liina.

Over his years of service Nosatov has been awarded the Order of Military Merit and the Order of Naval Merit, as well as various departmental medals.

== Personal life ==
He was one of the individuals targeted by sanctions over the Russo-Ukrainian war.

He was sanctioned by the UK government in 2014 in relation to the Russo-Ukrainian War.
