= Soviet ship Rezky =

Rezky (Russian: Резкий), also transliterated as Rezkyy or Rezkiy, is the name of the following ships of the Soviet Navy and/or Russian Navy:

- Soviet destroyer Rezky, a Gnevny-class destroyer launched in 1940, transferred to China in 1955, and scrapped in the late 1980s
- Soviet frigate Rezkiy, a Krivak-class frigate in commission 1976–1995
- Russian corvette Rezkiy, a Steregushchiy-class corvette commissioned in 2023

== See also ==
- Rezky (disambiguation)
