= Anatoly Lipinsky =

Russian admiral (born 1959)

- Russian: Анатолий Иванович Липинский
- Born: 7 June 1959 (age 67); Noginsk, RSFSR, USSR
- Military career
- Allegiance: Russia
- Branch: Russian Navy
- Rank: Rear Admiral
- Commands: Leningrad Naval base
- Awards: Order of Military Merit

Anatoly Ivanovich Lipinsky (Russian: Анатолий Иванович Липинский) is a Russian military leader, Rear Admiral former commander of the Leningrad Naval Base.

== Biography ==
Lipinsky was born on 7 June 1959 in the city of Noginsk of Moscow Oblast, Russia.

In 1981 after graduating from the S. M. Kirov Higher Naval School, Baku, he was posted to the Northern Fleet where he served on several ships as the principal warfare officer, an executive officer, and between 1985 and 1990 commanding officer of a small anti-submarine ship.

After graduating in 1993 from the N. G. Kuznetsov Naval Academy he served in the Pacific Fleet as the commanding officer of the Krivak-class frigate Retiviy, and as executive officer and then commanding officer of the Slava-class missile cruiser Varyag from 1996 to 1998.

- From 1998 to 2001 – the chief of staff of the 36th Division of surface ships.
- From 2001 to 2004 – the commander of the 100th Brigade of landing ships.
- From 2004 to 2006 – the commander of Sovetskaya Gavan naval area.
- By the decree of the President of the Russian Federation No.1112 of 9 October 2006 he was appointed of commander of Leningrad Naval Base.
- Subsequently, he was transferred to be the Commander, Novorossiysk Naval Base, from which position he retired on 21 September 2010.

He was awarded the "Order of Military Merit"; he is married and has two sons and a daughter

Military offices
Preceded by Aleksey Tuzov	Commander of Leningrad Naval Base; 9 October 2006 – July 2009	Succeeded by Aleksandr Fedotenkov
