= Rezky =

Rezky may refer to:

== People ==
- Rezky Ikhwan (born 1993), Indonesian footballer
- Rezza Rezky (born 2000), Singaporean footballer

== Ships ==
- Soviet destroyer Rezky (1940), a Gnevny-class destroyer
- Soviet frigate Rezkiy, a Krivak-class frigate
- Rezkiy, a Russian Steregushchiy-class corvette
