= Denis Berezovsky =

Ukrainian-Russian rear admiral

- Дени́с Валенти́нович Березо́вский
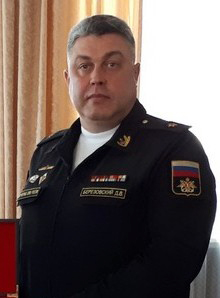
- Berezovsky in 2019
- Born: 15 July 1974 (age 52); Kharkiv, Ukrainian SSR, Soviet Union
- Military career
- Allegiance: Ukraine (until 2014); Crimea (2–24 March 2014); Russia (since 2014)
- Branch: Ukrainian Navy (1996–2014); Russian Navy (2014–present)
- Rank: Vice admiral
- Commands: Commander of the Ukrainian Navy; Deputy Commander of the Black Sea Fleet
- Conflicts: Russo-Ukrainian War; Annexation of Crimea

Denis Valentinovich Berezovsky (Russian: Дени́с Валенти́нович Березо́вский, Ukrainian: Денис Валентинович Березовський, romanized: Denys Valentynovych Berezovskyi; born 15 July 1974) is a Russian and former Ukrainian military officer. He is currently the deputy commander of the Russian Pacific Fleet, holding the rank of vice admiral. Previously, from 2014 to 2015, he was the deputy commander of the Russian Black Sea Fleet. Prior to his defection to Russia in 2014, he was the commander of the Ukrainian Navy.

== Early life ==
Denis Berezovsky was born on 15 July 1974, in Kharkiv, USSR.

== Military service ==
A graduate of the Nakhimov Higher Naval Institute (Sevastopol) in 1996, Berezovsky was the commander of the frigate Hetman Sahaydachniy from 2002 to 2005. On 6 December 2012, he was promoted to the rank of rear admiral. In 2012 and 2013, he led the joint exercises with Ukraine and the United States, Exercise Sea Breeze 2012 and Sea Breeze 2013. Prior to 1 March 2014, he served as deputy commander for combat training - Head of the Ukrainian Navy combat training. On 1 March 2014, President Turchynov appointed Berezovsky as Commander of the Naval Forces of Ukraine.

He was appointed commander-in-chief of the Ukrainian Navy by Interim President Oleksandr Turchynov on 1 March 2014, after the acting commander of the Ukrainian Navy Sergei Yeliseyev defected to Russia the same day. After serving for just one day, on 2 March, he defected to the self-declared pro-Russian separatist Crimean government during the 2014 Crimean crisis.

In the morning of 2 March 2014, Berezovsky was dismissed from his post as commander of the Ukrainian Navy after issuing orders to lay down arms. After being dismissed, he appeared in media to announce he was defecting to the Russian-supported new Crimean authorities as "pledging allegiance to the Crimean people".

On 24 March 2014, Russian Defence Minister Sergei Shoigu, along with a group from the Defence Ministry, visited Crimea, where he appointed Rear Admiral Denis Berezovsky as the new deputy commander of the Russian Black Sea Fleet. He served this post until 15 October 2015, before being posted again to the Russian Pacific Fleet as the deputy commander in November 2018. On 20 February 2020, he was awarded the rank of vice admiral.

== Defection ==
On 2 March 2014, Berezovsky defected to the new Russian-supported Crimean authorities and took an "oath of allegiance to the people of Crimea". "Earlier in the morning of the same day" (as was announced later), he was removed from his position in the Ukrainian Navy "for failing to manage the Navy in extreme conditions" at the decision of the Defense Minister, Ihor Tenyukh. Dmitry Tymchuk, the head of the Center of Military and Political Research, suggested at his Facebook page that Berezovsky pledged his allegiance when his family was kidnapped and held hostage. His defection immediately resulted in Ukraine launching a treason case against him, and the appointment of Serhiy Hayduk as his successor.

On 3 March 2014, both Berezovsky and Hayduk addressed Ukrainian Navy officers. The officers broke into applause when Hayduk read them the order that removed Berezovsky from his position and that Berezovsky was facing treason charges; this was followed by spontaneous singing of the Ukrainian national anthem. Berezovsky then unsuccessfully tried to entice the officers over to the newly proclaimed Crimean fleet, which he had been appointed head of — assuring them that they would retain their ranks and there would be no interruption of salary payments. He (then) claimed that "Viktor Yanukovych is the legitimately elected president of Ukraine," and that thus it would be no breach of oath if they served Crimea since "the seizure of power in Kyiv was orchestrated from abroad" (referring to the 2014 Ukrainian revolution).

=== Sanctions ===
He was sanctioned by the UK government in 2014 in relation to the Russo-Ukrainian War.

== Honours ==
- Medal "For Irreproachable Service", 3rd Class (27 June 2007, revoked in March 2014) - for personal contribution to strengthening the defense of Ukraine, the exemplary performance of military duty, and on the Day of the Naval Forces of Ukraine.
- The memorial "230 years of the Black Sea Fleet of the Russian Federation" (the Black Sea Fleet of the Russian Navy, 2013) - for active participation in the preparation and conduct of the joint Ukrainian-Russian exercises "Fairway of Peace 2013" shown a high level of theoretical training, sea, field, and flight proficiency.

== See also ==
- 2014 Russian military intervention in Ukraine

Military offices
Preceded by Yuriy Ilyin	Naval Commander of Ukraine; 2014	Succeeded by Serhiy Hayduk
