= Aldar Tsydenzhapov =

Russian naval volunteer

Aldar Batorovich Tsydenzhapov
- Алдар Баторович Цыденжапов
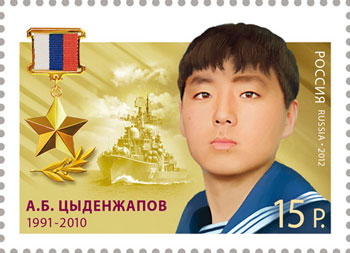
- Tsydenzhapov, as shown on a Russian stamp.
- Born: 4 August 1991; Aginskoye, Agin-Buryat Autonomous Okrug, Chita Oblast, RSFSR, USSR
- Died: 28 September 2010 (aged 19); Vladivostok, Primorsky Krai, Russia
- Military career
- Allegiance: Russia
- Branch: Russian Navy
- Service years: 2009–2010
- Rank: Seaman
- Unit: Pacific Fleet
- Awards: Hero of the Russian Federation

Aldar Batorovich Tsydenzhapov (Russian: Алда́р Ба́торович Цыденжа́пов; 4 August 1991 – 28 September 2010) was a seaman of the Russian Navy serving on the destroyer Bystry of the Pacific Fleet, who was the only fatal victim of a fire that broke out on the destroyer on 24 September 2010. He was posthumously awarded the Gold Star of the Hero of the Russian Federation for his role in extinguishing the fire and preventing an explosion.

== Biography ==
Aldar Tsydenzhapov was a Russian naval volunteer of Buryat-Mongolian ethnicity, born on 4 August 1991 in Aginskoe, Russia. He was the youngest child in his family along with his twin sister Ariuna. He had a brother named Bulat and a sister named Irina. His father Bator Tsydenzhapov is a retired law enforcement employee and his mother Biligma Tsydenzhapova is a kindergarten nurse. He graduated from high school in his hometown and would have gone to university. Instead, he decided to emulate his grandfather, Zydyga Garmaevich Vanchikov, and join the navy. The Russian navy rejected his application several times because he was underweight and too short, but he persisted and in November 2009 he was allowed to enter military service with the navy. He was stationed at the military unit number 40074 of the Pacific Fleet, stationed in Fokino, Primorsky Krai.

On 24 September 2010 a fire broke out on the destroyer Bystry while Aldar was working in the engine room near the boiler. A fuel pipeline burst in the engine room before the Bystry left the harbor and a fire broke out due to a spark from a short circuit. One of five mechanics in the engine room at the time, Aldar rushed to shut off the fuel supply to the boiler, preventing a potentially disastrous explosion. The valve Aldar closed was located inside the fire and he was badly burned during the roughly nine seconds that he spent working on the valve before rushing out of the room. Aldar was taken to the hospital of the Pacific Fleet in Vladivostok and died four days later on 28 September. He had less than a month to serve at the time of his death.

Aldar sacrificed himself to save the 300 crew members and the warship. His name is kept on the crew list of the destroyer Bystry and his bed is maintained and unused. He received a posthumous honor for the act.

== Remembrance ==
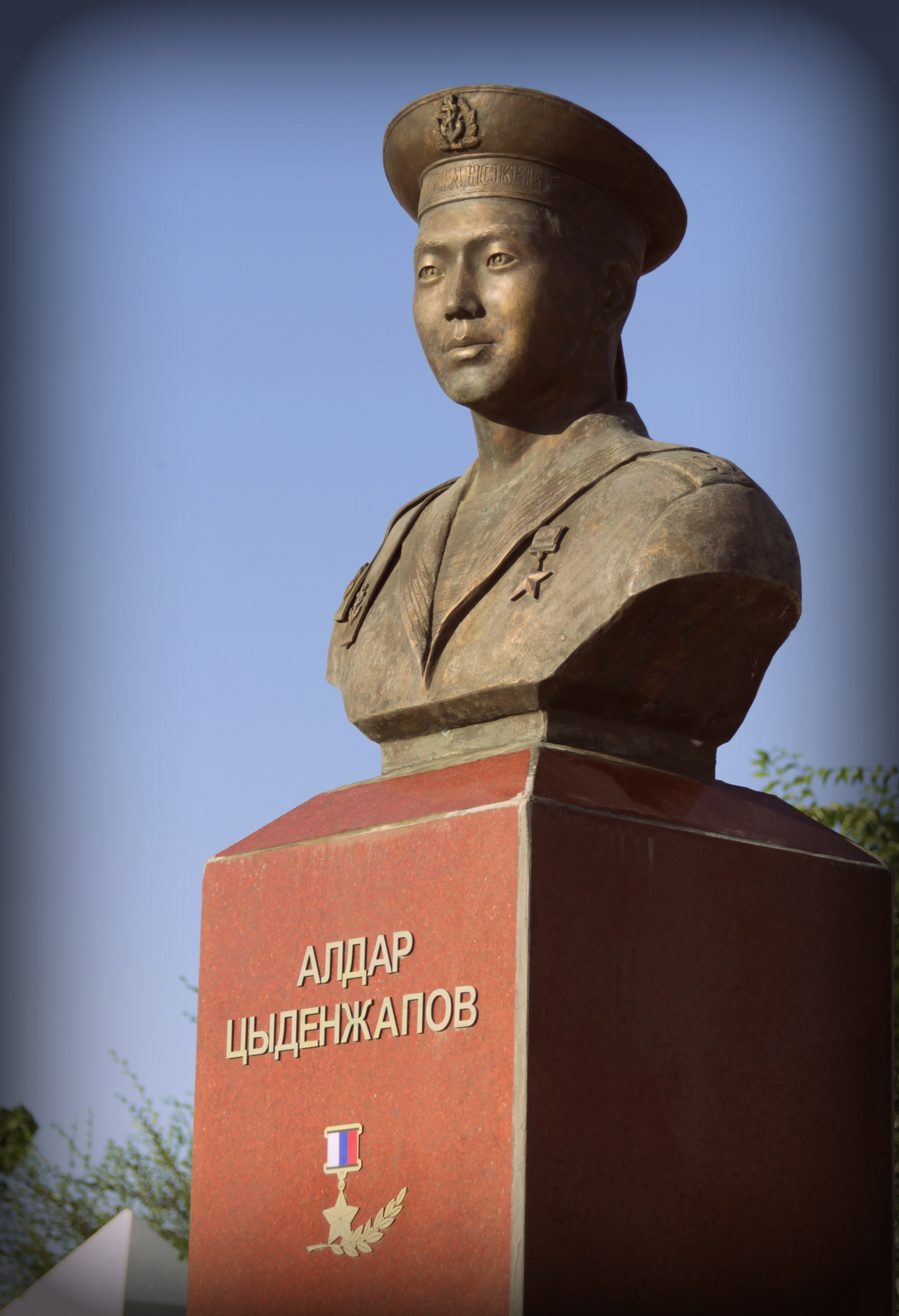
Monument to Aldar Tsydenzhapov on the Alley of Heroes in Aginskoye, July 2012

- Aldar Tsydenzhapov Street in the village of Aginskoye was named after him.
- A street in the village of Ust-Ordynsky Ekhirit-Bulagatsky district of the Irkutsk region was named after him.
- A memorial plaque was installed at the school in the village of Aginskoye, where he studied.
- A memorial sign was unveiled at the home pier of the Bystry on the shore of Abrek Bay where ships of the Primorsky Association of the Pacific Fleet are based.
- In 2011, a monument was erected in the village of Selendum, Selenginsky district of Buryatia.
- In 2012, a postage stamp with a portrait of Aldar Tsydenzhapov was issued in the series “Heroes of the Russian Federation”.
- On 22 July 2015, the project 20380 corvette Hero of the Russian Federation Aldar Tsydenzhapov was launched at the Amur shipyard. On 25 December 2020, the corvette was commissioned into the Pacific Fleet.
- On 21 February 2015, a monument in the form of an anchor was erected on Aldar Tsydenzhapov Street in the village of Aginskoye.
- On 30 June 2016, a monument to Aldar Tsydenzhapov was unveiled in Ulan-Ude, built with money from students.
- On 13 October 2017, school 57 in Ulan-Ude was named after Aldar Tsydenzhapov.

== Awards and tributes ==
- Hero of the Russian Federation (2011).
- Russian Navy Steregushchiy-class corvette Hero of the Russian Federation Aldar Tsydenzhapov is named after him. (2019)

== See also ==
- List of Heroes of the Russian Federation

Other sailors who died while saving their ships:

- Francis Harvey
- Wilhelm Heidkamp
