= Leningrad Naval Base =

Leningrad Naval base
- Part of Baltic Fleet
- Saint Petersburg
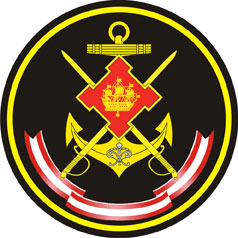
- The Logo of the Leningrad Naval base

Site information
- Owner: Russian Armed Forces
- Controlled by: Russian Navy
- Open to the public: No

Site history
- Built: March 15, 1919

Garrison information
- Current commander: Rear Admiral Vyacheslav Rodionov
- Past commanders: Rear Admiral Anatoly Lipinsky
- Garrison: St. Petersburg

The Leningrad Naval Base is part of the Baltic Fleet of the Russian Navy.

== History ==
The Naval base was created on the basis of Order No. 117 as of March 15, 1919 of the Baltic Sea Fleet. The Naval Forces of Petrograd were transformed by the order into the Petrograd Naval Base. The Petrograd, then the Leningrad naval base has since that time been sometimes abolished, reformed and again created. In the summer of 1919, the crews of torpedo boats Gavril and Azard, and also the submarine Pantera under Aleksandr Bakhtin's command scored the first successes ('kills') for the base, sinking the submarine HMS L55 and the destroyer HMS Vittoria of the British Royal Navy.

During the Great Patriotic War from the headquarters of the naval educational institutions and fleet units a sea defence of Leningrad and Lake area headquarters was created. About 100,000 military seamen fought on the Leningrad front. In 1941-1944 naval vessels of this base participated in carrying out of landing operations in areas Strelna, Peterhof, on Lake Ladoga, in the Vyborg and in the Narva gulfs. During the blockade of Leningrad the fleet provided communication of the besieged city with the country through Lake Ladoga. 1.7 million tons of cargo were transported and 1 million people were evacuated on the water line of the Road of Life alone.

From October 1988 the base consisted of the:

- 25th Submarine Brigade (Kronshtadt, Saint Petersburg)
- 105th Naval Region Protection Brigade (Kronshtadt, Saint Petersburg)
- 166th Brigade of Constructed and Overhauled Ships (Kronshtadt, Saint Petersburg)

Since 1994 the base has been part of the Baltic Fleet.

== Ships in 2008 ==
#	Ship					Commander	
#	Type (and project)	Name	Pennant number	Active in the fleet	Notes	Captain's Rank	Captain's Name
105th brigade of the ships of protection of water area (based in Kronstadt)						Captain of 1st rank	Sergey Pinchuk
109th battalion of the small anti-submarine ships						Captain of 2nd rank	Maxim Kirpichnikov
1	Project 1331M small anti-submarine ship	MPK-99 "Zelenodolsk" Russian: МПК-99 «Зеленодольск»	308	since 1987	Under repair	Captain of 3rd rank	Evgenie Tishkevich
2	Project 1331M small anti-submarine ship	MPK-192 "Urengoy" Russian: МПК-192 «Уренгой»	304	since 1986		Captain Lieutenant	Evgenie Kuznetsov
3	Project 1331M small anti-submarine ship	MPK-205 "Kazanets" (translate:Citizen of Kazan) Russian: МПК-205 «Казанец»	311	since 1987			
22nd Minesweeper Division						Captain of 2nd rank	Michael Ahahlin
4	Base minesweeper of project 12650	BT-44 Russian: БТ-44	563	since 1985			
5	Base minesweeper ship of project 12650	BT-115 Russian: БТ-115	561	since 1994		Captain Lieutenant	Vladimir Remezov
123rd separate submarines under repair battalion (based in Kronstadt)						Captain of 1st rank	Igor Martemjanov
6	Project 877 class diesel submarine	B-227 Russian: Б-227		since 1983		Captain of 2nd rank	Igor Abitov
7	Project 877EKM diesel submarine	B-806 Russian: Б-806		since 1986		Captain of 3rd rank	Vitaly Tchikin
13th brigade of the under construction and repaired ships (based in Kronstadt)						Captain of 1st rank	Sergey Petrovich Belonogy
8	diesel submarine of project 677 (Lada class submarine)	B-585 "Saint Petersburg" Russian: Б-585 «Санкт-Петербург»		Formally as a part of fleet since 2007	To be commissioned in 2010.		
32nd Separate Division of Support Vessels (based in Priozersk)						Captain of 1st rank	Vladimir Karmanov

== Commanders ==
During Soviet times, the post was known as the Commandant of the Kronstadt naval fortress.

- Admiral Valentin Selivanov (December 1989 - September 1992)
- Vice Admiral Vladimir Grishanov (February 1993 - August 1995)
- Vice Admiral Alexander Kornilov (December 1995 - October 2002)
- Vice Admiral Vladimir Kudryavtsev (October 2002 - March 2006)
- Rear Admiral Alexey Tuzov (March - November 2006)
- Rear Admiral Anatoly Lipinsky (November 2006 - July 2009)
- Rear Admiral Aleksandr Fedotenkov (September 2009 - June 2011)
- Captain Oleg Zhuravlyov (December 2011 - May 2015)
- Rear Admiral Igor Smolyak (May 2015 - September 2017)
- Rear Admiral Vyacheslav Rodionov (since September 2017)
