= Igor Smolyak =

Russian naval officer

Igor Vladimirovich Smolyak
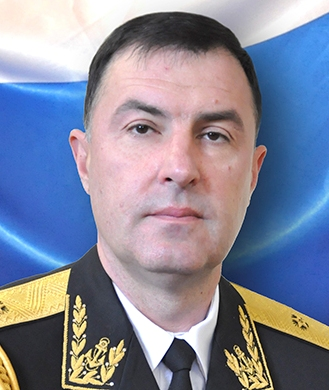
- Born: 27 February 1968 (age 58); Velyki Sorochyntsi, Myrhorod Raion, Poltava Oblast, Ukrainian SSR, USSR
- Allegiance: Soviet Union; Russia
- Branch: Soviet Navy; Russian Navy
- Service years: 1985-2022
- Rank: Rear-Admiral
- Commands: Moskva; 30th Surface Ship Division; 36th Surface Ship Division; Nakhimov Black Sea Higher Naval School; Leningrad Naval Base
- Awards: Order of Courage; Order of Military Merit

Igor Vladimirovich Smolyak (Russian: Игорь Владимирович Смоляк; born 27 February 1968) is a retired officer of the Russian Navy. He holds the rank of Rear-Admiral, and served as commander of the Leningrad Naval Base between 2015 and 2016, and as commander of the Nakhimov Black Sea Higher Naval School between 2016 and 2017.

== Biography ==
Smolyak was born on 27 February 1968 in the village of Velyki Sorochyntsi, Myrhorod Raion, Poltava Oblast, in what was then the Ukrainian Soviet Socialist Republic, in the Soviet Union. He entered the Soviet Navy, studying at the Leningrad Nakhimov Naval School and graduating in 1985. Having received a grounding in naval training, he entered the Nakhimov Black Sea Higher Naval School in Sevastopol to prepare for officer commissioning, and graduated in 1990. He began his active service in the Northern Fleet, serving as commander of a missile and artillery warhead control group aboard the aircraft carrier Admiral Kuznetsov. He was transferred to the Black Sea Fleet in 1993, where after starting out as commander of a warship's missile and artillery warhead group, he was executive officer of the Kashin-class destroyer Sderzhanny, and then executive officer of the Kara-class cruiser Kerch. His next post was in command of his own ship, the Kashin-class destroyer Smetlivy. After carrying out further studies at the Kuznetsov Naval Academy and graduating in 2004, Smolyak returned to the Black Sea Fleet. He served as commander of a rescue vessel division, executive officer of the missile cruiser Moskva, before being appointed to command the Moskva.

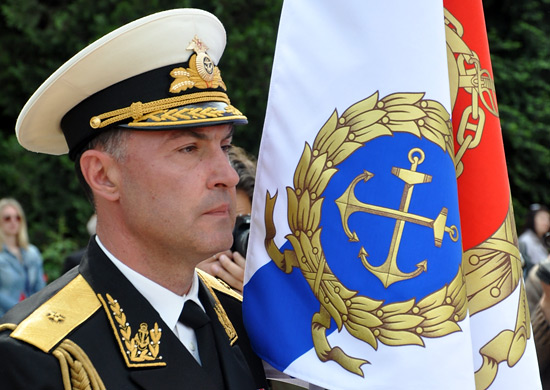
Smolyak in May 2014, during his tenure as head of the Nakhimov Black Sea Higher Naval School

Smolyak continued his service with the Black Sea Fleet, as deputy commander, and then commander of the 30th Surface Ship Division. In December 2011, he transferred to the Pacific Fleet to command the 36th Surface Ship Division. He held this post until 25 March 2014, when he was appointed as head of the Nakhimov Black Sea Higher Naval School in Sevastopol. He became the first head of the former-Ukrainian school after the annexation of Crimea by the Russian Federation. In March 2015, he was reassigned to the Baltic Fleet as commander of the Leningrad Naval Base. His next posting was as chief of the Western Military District's naval directorate between September 2016 and September 2017. After studies at the Military Academy of the General Staff, from which he graduated in 2019, Smolyak was appointed chief of staff and first deputy commander of the Black Sea Fleet.

During his time as first deputy commander, the 2021 Black Sea incident took place. On 23 June 2021, the British destroyer HMS Defender conducted a freedom of navigation voyage through waters off Crimea. The ability of the British ship to do so caused controversy in Russia, and on 5 October 2021, Smolyak was reassigned, being appointed as deputy commander of the Baltic Fleet. It was noted by online commentators that this was an effective demotion from having been second in command of the Black Sea Fleet.

Smolyak is married and has a daughter.

== Honours and awards ==
Over his career Smolyak has received the Order of Courage, the Order of Military Merit, and various other medals.
