= Gavriil Zhukov =

Soviet naval commander

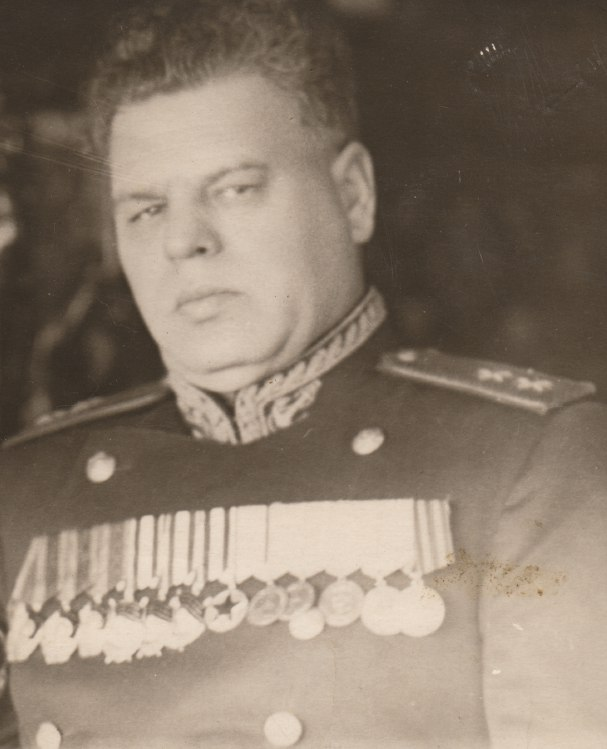
- Born: 24 March 1899; Bereyozovy Gai, Samara Oblast, Russian Empire
- Died: 8 January 1957 (aged 57); Odessa, Ukrainian SSR, Soviet Union
- Military career
- Allegiance: Soviet Union
- Branch: Soviet Navy
- Service years: 1918–1950
- Rank: Vice Admiral (1944)
- Commands: Odessa Defense Region
- Conflicts: Russian Civil War; Spanish Civil War; World War II
- Awards: Order of Lenin (3); Order of the Red Banner (4); Order of Nakhimov; Medal "For the Defence of Odessa"

Gavriil Vasilyevich Zhukov (Russian: Гавриил Васильевич Жуков; 24 March 1899 - 8 January 1957) was a Soviet naval commander who served in both the Spanish Civil War and the Second World War.

== Early life ==
Zhukov was born in the Village of Beryozovy Gai in the Samara Governorate in 1899. After limited schooling at the age of 15 he was employed at a factory manufacturing artillery fuzes. Later he traveled to Petrograd and entered a maritime School there. In April 1918, he joined the Red Army sailors' detachment and took part in battles with the White Guard troops in Samara, Simbirsk and Kazan in the composition of the Volga Military Flotillas. He rose through the ranks first as a seaman, then a machine gunner, chief of staff of the sailors' unit and finally adjutant to the unit commander. After the Civil War from 1925 to 1927 he studied at the Russian Naval School. During the Spanish Civil War from October 1936 to 31 July 1937, Zhukov was in Spain as adviser and assistant to the naval attaché to Nikolai Kuznetsov . For his participation alongside the Spanish Republicans he received his first Order of Lenin. From its construction in 1937 to 1939 he was captain of the cruiser Maxim Gorky and was then promoted in 1939 to command the Detachment of Training Ships of the Baltic Fleet, before serving as commandant of the Northwestern Fortified Region of the Black Sea Fleet. In March 1940, he was transferred to command the Odessa Naval Base .

== Second World War ==
When the Germans invaded the USSR, Gavriil Zhukov was the commander of the Odessa Naval Base as well as the Odessa Defense Region during the Siege of Odessa when the city was surrounded by Romanian and German forces in August 1941 until the evacuation of troops in October 1941. In December, Zhukov was appointed deputy commander of the Black Sea Fleet for land defense of its main base, Sevastopol. After the defense of Sevastopol, he commanded naval bases, taking charge of the Tuapse Naval Base in April 1942. In May 1943 Zhukov was transferred to command the Island Naval Base of the Baltic Fleet on Lavansaari and Seiskari in the Gulf of Finland. In January 1945 he was shifted to command the Odessa Naval Base.

== Later life ==
Between 1946 and 1948, Zhukov commanded the Southern Naval Region of the Pacific Fleet, before serving as chief of the Black Sea Higher Naval School in Sevastopol. In September 1948 he was transferred to serve as chief of the Odessa Higher Nautical School, his last post before he resigned due to illness in 1951. Zhukov died in Odessa in 1957 and buried at the Second Christian Cemetery in Odessa.
