= Viktor Kravchuk =

Russian naval officer

Viktor Petrovich Kravchuk
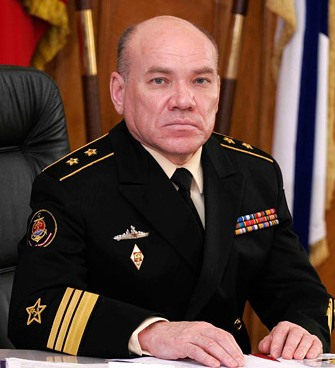
- Born: 18 January 1961 (age 65); Palasher, Usolsky District, Perm Oblast, Russian SFSR, USSR
- Allegiance: Soviet Union; Russia
- Branch: Soviet Navy; Russian Navy
- Service years: 1978-2016
- Rank: Vice-Admiral
- Commands: Caspian Flotilla; Baltic Fleet
- Awards: Order of Military Merit

Viktor Petrovich Kravchuk (Russian: Виктор Петрович Кравчук; born 18 January 1961) is a retired officer of the Russian Navy. He holds the rank of Vice-Admiral, and served as commander of the Caspian Flotilla between 2005 and 2009, and as commander of the Baltic Fleet between 2012 and 2016.

== Biography ==
Kravchuk was born on 18 January 1961 in the village of Palasher, Usolsky District, in what was then Perm Oblast, Russian Soviet Federative Socialist Republic, in the Soviet Union. He entered the Soviet Navy, studying at the Pacific Higher Naval School in Vladivostok from 1978 to 1983. He was then assigned to serve in the Pacific Fleet, where he worked up through the positions of commander of the navigation combat unit of a patrol ship, to commander of a missile boat. He undertook further study with the Higher Special Officer Classes of the Navy between 1987 and 1988, and then served as chief of staff of a missile boat division, then its commander, then chief of staff, and then commander of a missile boat brigade by 1999. He combined this with studies at the Kuznetsov Naval Academy, graduating in absentia in 1997. Between 1999 and 2000, he was deputy flotilla commander and head of armaments of the Caspian Flotilla.

Kravchuk studied at the Military Academy of the General Staff of the Armed Forces between 2000 and 2002, and on graduation was appointed deputy commander of the Caspian Flotilla. From 2003, he served as chief of staff and first deputy commander of the flotilla, being promoted to the rank of rear-admiral on 22 February 2004. On 4 November 2005 he was appointed commander of the Caspian Flotilla, and was promoted to vice-admiral in 2007. He held this post until December 2009, when he was appointed deputy commander of the Baltic Fleet. On 14 September 2012, by decree of the President of Russia, Kravchuk was appointed commander of the Baltic Fleet.

=== Dismissal from service ===
On 29 June 2016, Kravchuk, the Baltic Fleet's chief of staff Sergei Popov, and a number of other Baltic Fleet officials, were removed from their posts by order of Defence Minister Sergei Shoigu. The removals followed a control inspection of the Baltic Fleet between 11 May and 10 June 2016, which in turn followed a period of increased NATO activity around Kaliningrad and the May Anaconda and June BALTOPS 2016 military exercises. The Ministry of Defence issued a statement attributing the removals as "for serious omissions in combat training, as well as distortion of the real state of affairs in reports." The removal of officers temporarily left Vice-Admiral Sergei Yeliseyev, a former deputy commander of the Ukrainian Navy prior to his defection to Russia during the Russian annexation of Crimea, as senior officer of the Baltic Fleet, before Vice-Admiral Aleksandr Nosatov, only recently appointed as head of the Kuznetsov Naval Academy, was assigned as the new commander.

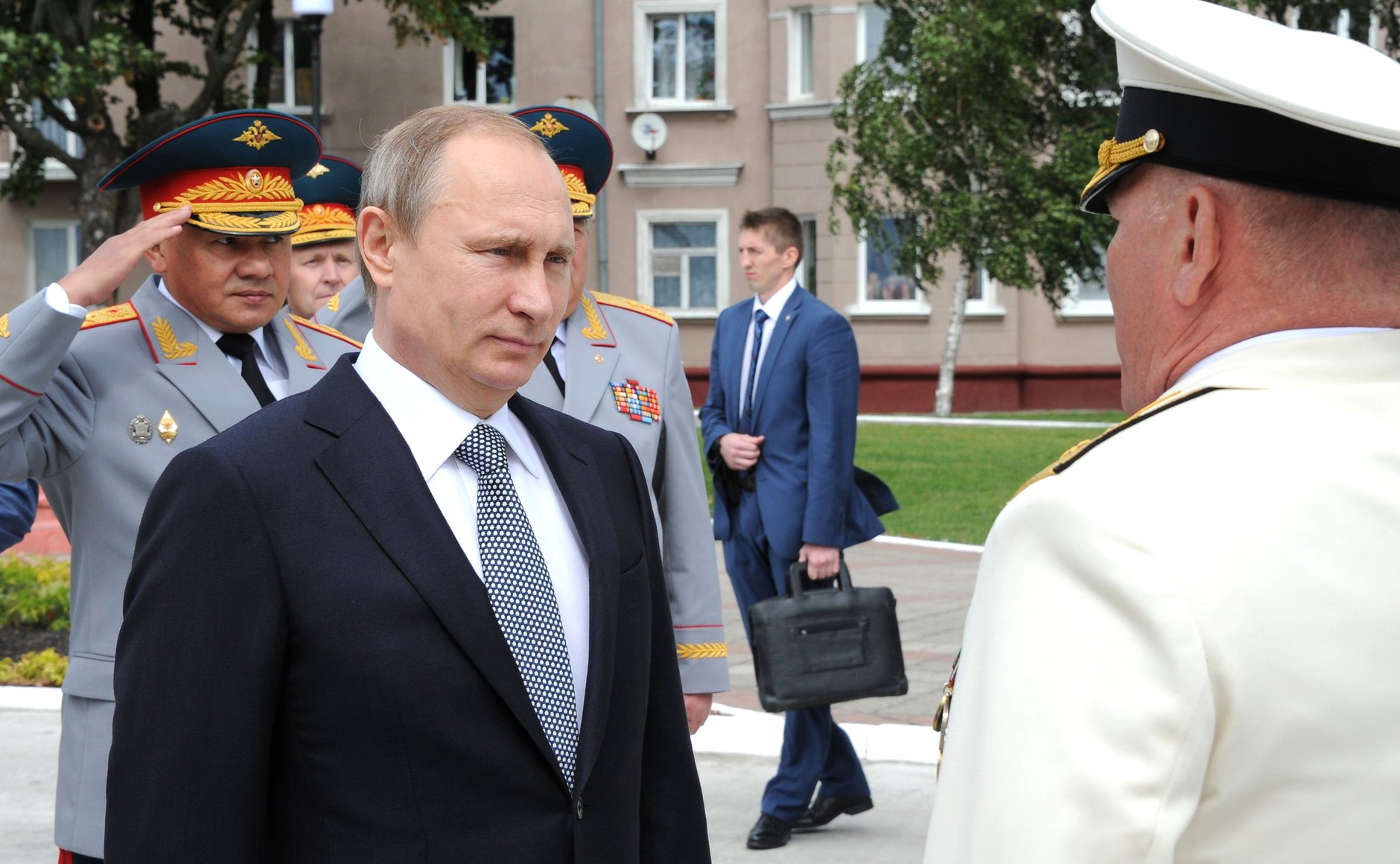
President Vladimir Putin and Defence Minister Sergei Shoigu meeting Kravchuk at the Navy Day celebrations in Baltiysk on 26 July 2015. Less than a year later Putin and Shoigu would sack Kravchuk for "serious omissions".

Kravchuk filed a complaint with the Supreme Court in July 2016, arguing for the reason of dismissal due to professional incompetence be cancelled and that he be allowed to resign due to health reasons. This would have allowed him to retain his pensions and benefits. The Supreme Court dismissed Kravchuk's case in 2017.

== Honours and awards ==
Over his career Kravchuk has received the Order of Military Merit, and various other medals. On 6 February 2016 he was awarded a personalized dirk for special services to the state and the Armed Forces by Colonel-General Andrei Kartapolov, commander of the Western Military District, at a ceremony of the district's Military Council in Saint Petersburg.

Military offices
| Preceded by Yuri Startsev | Commander of the Caspian Flotilla; 2005-2009 | Succeeded by Sergei Alyokminsky |
