= Russian destroyer Bezboyaznenny =

Sovremenny-class destroyer of the Russian Navy

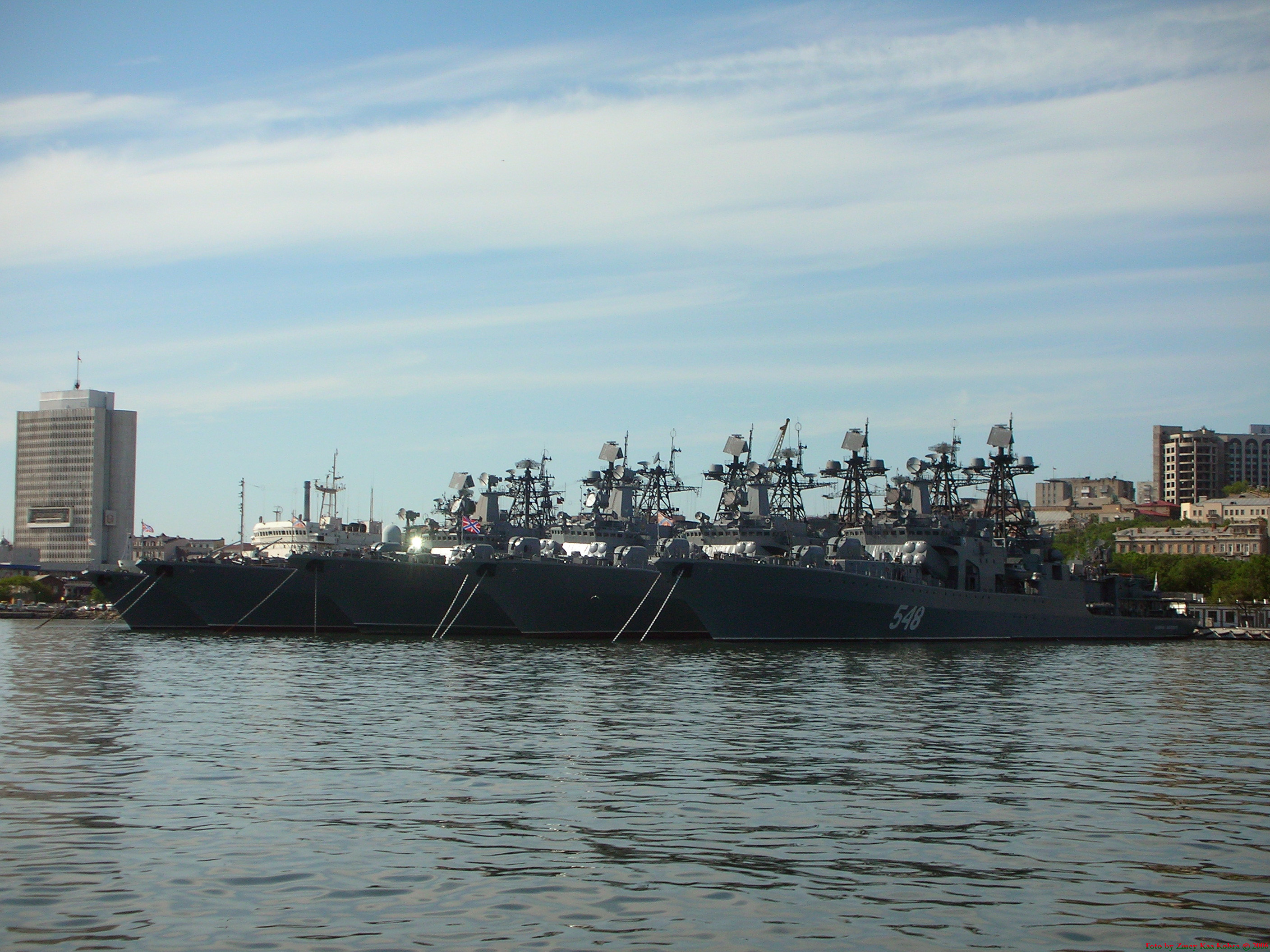
- Bezboyaznenny (far left) along with four Udaloy class

History

Soviet Union → Russia
- Name: Bezboyaznenny; (Безбоязненный)
- Namesake: Fearless in Russian
- Builder: Zhdanov Shipyard, Leningrad
- Laid down: 8 January 1987
- Launched: 18 February 1989
- Commissioned: 29 December 1990
- Decommissioned: 1999
- Home port: Vladivostok
- Identification: Pennant number: 672, 711, 754
- Fate: Scrapped October 2020

General characteristics
- Class & type: Sovremenny-class destroyer
- Displacement: 6,600 tons standard, 8,480 tons full load
- Length: 156 m (511 ft 10 in)
- Beam: 17.3 m (56 ft 9 in)
- Draught: 6.5 m (21 ft 4 in)
- Propulsion: 2 shaft steam turbines, 4 boilers, 75,000 kW (100,000 hp), 2 fixed propellers, 2 turbo generators, and 2 diesel generators
- Speed: 32.7 knots (60.6 km/h; 37.6 mph)
- Range: 3,920 nmi (7,260 km; 4,510 mi) at 18 knots (33 km/h; 21 mph); 1,345 nmi (2,491 km; 1,548 mi) at 33 knots (61 km/h; 38 mph)
- Complement: 350
- Sensors & processing systems: Radar: Air target acquisition radar, 3 × navigation radars, 130 mm gun fire-control radars, 30 mm air-defence gun fire control radar; Sonar: Active and passive under-keel sonar; ES: Tactical situation plotting board, anti-ship missile fire control system, air defence, missile fire-control system, and torpedo fire control system
- Electronic warfare & decoys: 2 PK-2 decoy dispensers (200 rockets)
- Armament: Guns: 2 × twin AK-130 130 mm (5 in) naval guns; 4 × 30 mm (1.2 in) AK-630 CIWS; Missiles; 2 × quad (SS-N-22 'Sunburn') anti-ship missiles; 2 × 24 SA-N-7 'Gadfly' surface-to-air missiles; Anti-submarine: 2 × twin 533 mm (21 in) torpedo tubes; 2 × 6 RBU-1000 300 mm (12 in) anti-submarine rocket launchers
- Aircraft carried: 1× Ka-27 helicopter
- Aviation facilities: Helipad

Bezboyaznenny was a Sovremenny-class destroyer of the Soviet and later Russian navy.

== Development and design ==
The project began in the late 1960s when it was becoming obvious in the Soviet Navy that naval guns still had an important role particularly in support of amphibious landings, but existing gun cruisers and destroyers were showing their age. A new design was started, employing a new 130-millimetre (5 in) automatic gun turret.

The Sovremenny-class ships were 156 metres (512 ft) in length, with a beam of 17.3 metres (56 ft 9 in) and a draught of 6.5 metres (21 ft 4 in).

== Construction and career ==
Bezboyaznenny was laid down on 28 September 1982 and launched on 27 July 1985 by Zhdanov Shipyard in Leningrad. She was commissioned on 24 February 1987.

In the period from November 25, 1991, to January 7, 1992, the ship carried out an inter-fleet passage from Baltiysk to Vladivostok, without calling at foreign ports. During the passage in the Red Sea, one of the sailors disappeared under unknown circumstances. Another sailor arrested on suspicion of involvement, placed and locked up in a combat post, was found dead in this post three days before arriving in Vladivostok.

From April 18 to April 22, 1993, her together with Bystry, took part in an anti-submarine search operation in the Sea of Japan, during which six contacts with foreign submarines were recorded. From August 18 to September 16, 1994, she took part in the Pacific Fleet exercises, and hit an air target as part of a ship formation.

On October 6, 1994, an accident occurred on the ship during preparation for the cruise, as a result of which four sailors were scalded with steam.

On May 9, 1995, during the parade in honor of the 50th anniversary of the victory over Nazi Germany in the Golden Horn Bay, in the sailor's cabin of the BCh-2, the senior sailor Romin, a native of Kamchatka, was beaten to death by the conscripts. (The commander of the ship V.P. Masko for this incident was removed from office.) In August, the destroyer took part in the parade in honor of the 50th anniversary of the end of the war in the Golden Horn Bay. On October 20, the ship received the prize of the Commander-in-Chief of the Navy for the performance of rocket firing as part of the KUG with the destroyer Boyevoy.

At the end of 1997, the destroyer was recognized as the best in the Pacific Fleet in terms of fire training.

In 1999, the ship was taken to the reserve for repairs but remained there until 2018.

It was sent for recycling in October 2020.
