= Aleksandr Fedotenkov =

Russian naval officer (born 1959)

Aleksandr Nikolaevich Fedotenkov
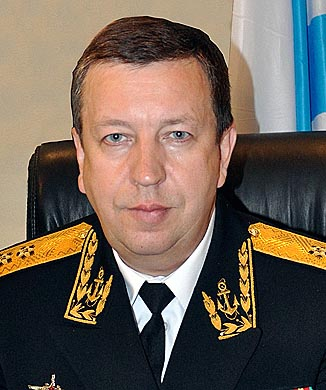
- Born: 17 January 1959 (age 67); Seltso, Bryansk Oblast, Russian SFSR, USSR
- Allegiance: Soviet Union; Russia
- Branch: Soviet Navy; Russian Navy
- Service years: 1976–2018
- Rank: Vice-Admiral
- Commands: Leningrad Naval Base; Black Sea Fleet
- Awards: Order of Courage; Order "For Service to the Homeland in the Armed Forces of the USSR" Third Class

Aleksandr Nikolaevich Fedotenkov (Russian: Александр Николаевич Федотенков; born 7 January 1959) is a former officer of the Russian Navy. He holds the rank of Vice-Admiral, and was deputy commander of the Russian Navy.

== Career ==
Fedotenkov was born on 7 January 1959 in Seltso, Bryansk Oblast, then part of the Russian SFSR in the Soviet Union. He attended the Nakhimov Black Sea Higher Naval School, graduating in 1981, and going on to serve in the Northern Fleet. Here he rose through the ranks from a laboratory engineer to senior assistant commander of a submarine. He took the Higher Special Officer Classes of the Navy, graduating in 1992, and in 1993 took command of the Project 671RTM/RTMK Shchuka nuclear attack submarine B-524. This was followed with an appointment as deputy commander of the 33rd Submarine Division of the Northern Fleet.

Fedotenkov graduated with honours from the N. G. Kuznetsov Naval Academy in 2000, and from then until 2002 served as chief of staff of the 7th Submarine Division of the Northern Fleet, and then as its commander from 2002 until 2005. After further study at the Military Academy of the General Staff of the Armed Forces of Russia, he graduated in 2007 and until 2009 served as Deputy Commander of the Kola Flotilla, part of the Northern Fleet. From 2009 until 2011, he was commander of Leningrad Naval Base, and by decree of the President of Russia, he was appointed commander of the Black Sea Fleet on 24 June 2011. He succeeded Vladimir Korolyov, who was appointed to command the Northern Fleet. He was promoted to vice-admiral on 13 December 2012. On 17 April 2013 Fedotenkov was appointed Deputy Commander-in-Chief of the Navy of the Russian Federation.

In May 2015, Fedotenkov was the Russian leader for the joint Sino-Russian naval exercises "Sea Cooperation 2015" in the Mediterranean and Black Seas, alongside his counterpart, Vice-Admiral Du Jingchen of the People's Liberation Army Navy. Ten ships from the Chinese and Russian navies took part in the week-long exercises starting on 17 May. Fedotenkov stated that the goal of the exercises was to "strengthen mutual understanding between the navies ... regarding boosting stability, countering new challenges and threats at sea." Fedotenkov was also the Russian director for the exercises the following year, which took place in the waters off Zhanjiang, Guangdong province. Fedotenkov reached the age of 60, the mandatory age for retirement, in 2018, and stepped down from active service. He has since been an advisor on warship construction to the director of the Malakhit Marine Engineering Bureau.

Over his career Fedotenkov has been awarded the Order of Courage and the Order "For Service to the Homeland in the Armed Forces of the USSR" Third Class. He is married, with a son.
