= Rezky Ikhwan =

Indonesian footballer

Personal information
- Full name: Rezky Ikhwan
- Date of birth: 21 June 1993 (age 33)
- Place of birth: Bogor, Indonesia
- Height: 1.62 m (5 ft 4 in)
- Position: Midfielder

Senior career*
Years	Team	Apps	(Gls)
2014–2016	Persikabo Bogor	22	(0)
2017–2018	Persika Karawang	32	(8)
2019–2020	Persikabo 1973	12	(0)
2021	Badak Lampung	4	(0)
2022–2023	Adhyaksa Farmel	4	(0)
2023–2024	Persika 1951	12	(0)
2024–2025	Citeureup Raya	5	(0)
2025	PSB Bogor	5	(1)
2026	Sriwijaya	1	(0)
- * Club domestic league appearances and goals as of 16 January 2026

Rezky Ikhwan (born 21 June 1993) is an Indonesian professional footballer who plays as a midfielder.

== Club career ==
=== Persika Karawang ===
He was signed for Persika Karawang to play in Liga 2 in 2017 and 2018 season.

=== TIRA-Persikabo ===
In 2019, Rezky Ikhwan signed a year contract with TIRA-Persikabo from Persika Karawang. He made his league debut on 18 May 2019 in a match against Badak Lampung at the Pakansari Stadium, Cibinong.

=== Badak Lampung ===
In 2021, Rezky signed a contract with Indonesian Liga 2 club Badak Lampung. He made first 2021–22 Liga 2 debut on 19 October 2021, coming on as a starting in a 1–0 loss against RANS Cilegon at the Gelora Bung Karno Madya Stadium, Jakarta.

== Career statistics ==
=== Club ===
As of match played 23 November 2021

Club	Season	League			Cup (Note: Includes Piala Indonesia)		Continental		Other		Total	
Club	Season	Division	Apps	Goals	Apps	Goals	Apps	Goals	Apps	Goals	Apps	Goals
Persikabo Bogor	2014	Premier Division	14	0	0	0	0	0	0	0	14	0
Persikabo Bogor	2015	Premier Division	0	0	0	0	0	0	0	0	0	0
Persikabo Bogor	2016	ISC B	8	0	0	0	0	0	0	0	8	0
Persikabo Bogor	Total		22	0	0	0	0	0	0	0	22	0
Persika Karawang	2017	Liga 2	13	4	0	0	0	0	0	0	13	4
Persika Karawang	2018	Liga 2	19	4	0	0	0	0	0	0	19	4
Persika Karawang	Total		32	8	0	0	0	0	0	0	32	8
TIRA-Persikabo	2019	Liga 1	12	0	0	0	0	0	0	0	12	0
TIRA-Persikabo	2020	Liga 1	0	0	0	0	0	0	0	0	0	0
TIRA-Persikabo	Total		12	0	0	0	0	0	0	0	12	0
Badak Lampung	2021	Liga 2	4	0	0	0	0	0	0	0	4	0
Adhyaksa Farmel	2022-23	Liga 3	0	0	0	0	0	0	0	0	0	0
Career total			70	8	0	0	0	0	0	0	70	8
