= Sergei Yeliseyev (admiral) =

Ukrainian naval officer (born 1961)

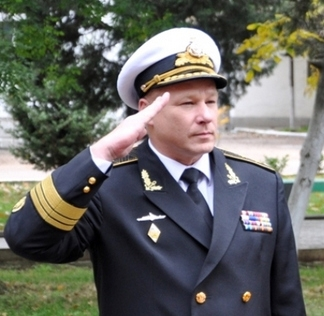
- Yeliseyev as First Deputy Commander of the Ukrainian Navy, (17 October 2013)
- Born: 24 October 1961 (age 64); Noginsk, Moscow Oblast, USSR
- Military career
- Allegiance: Ukraine (until 1 March 2014); Russia (since 2 March 2014)
- Branch: Soviet Navy (1983–1991); Ukrainian Navy (1993–2014); Russian Navy (2014–present)
- Service years: 1983–present
- Rank: Vice Admiral (Ukrainian Navy); Vice Admiral (Russian Navy)
- Commands: Commander of the Ukrainian Navy (acting); Deputy Commander of the Baltic Fleet

Sergei Stanislavovich Yeliseyev (Russian: Сергей Станиславович Елисеев, Ukrainian: Сергій Станіславович Єлісєєв; born 24 October 1961) is a Vice Admiral, former First Deputy Commander and acting commander-in-chief of the Ukrainian Navy who defected to Russia in 2014 during Russian annexation of Crimea.

== Early career ==
He graduated from a Soviet naval school in Kaliningrad in 1983 and previously served with the Russian Pacific Fleet of the Soviet Navy.

== Career with Ukraine ==
In 1993, Yeliseyev joined the newly formed Ukrainian Navy and in 1999–2001 he was the commander of the Ropucha-class landing ship U402 Kostyantyn Olshansky.

In 2004, he graduated from the National Defense Academy of Ukraine.

In 2010, he was appointed the First Deputy Commander of the Ukrainian Navy and later on promoted to Vice-admiral.

== Defection to Russia ==
From 19 February to 1 March 2014, Yeliseyev was acting Commander of the Ukrainian Navy as the First Deputy Commander. In March 2014, he broke the military oath of the Ukrainian Armed Forces and sided with the Russian Federation against Ukraine along with another high-ranking military officer, the appointed commander-in-chief of the Ukrainian Navy Denis Berezovsky in the wake of the annexation of Crimea.

In August 2014, the Military Prosecutor's Office of Ukraine accuse Yeliseyev of treason and desertion.

== Career with Russian Navy ==
Since July 2014, he has served as a Deputy Commander of the Russian Baltic Fleet and retained his rank of Vice-admiral in the Russian Navy.

Yeliseyev was the only senior officer in the command of the Baltic Fleet who retained his post after the dismissal of the then Baltic fleet commander Vice-admiral Viktor Kravchuk in June 2016 and the subsequent removal of more officers from the headquarters of the fleet for failure to comply to rules and regulations.

== See also ==
- Denis Berezovsky
