= Nakhimov Black Sea Higher Naval School =

Russian naval education institution

- Черноморское высшее военно-морское орденов Нахимова и Красной Звезды училище имени П. С. Нахимова
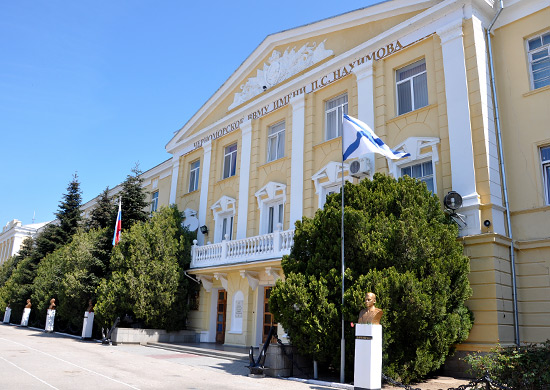
- Type: Military commissioning school
- Established: 1937
- President: Rear-Admiral Aleksandr Grinkevich
- Students: 2,800
- Location: Sevastopol, Crimea; 44.6065°N 33.4762°E
- Website: https://chvvmu.mil.ru/

The Nakhimov Black Sea Higher Naval School, formally the Black Sea Higher Naval Orders of Nakhimov and the Red Star School named after P. S. Nakhimov (Russian: Черноморское высшее военно-морское орденов Нахимова и Красной Звезды училище имени П. С. Нахимова, romanized: Chernomorskoye vyssheye voyenno-morskoye ordena Nakhimova i Krasnoy Zvezdy uchilishche imeni P. S. Nakhimova), abbreviated as ChVVMU (Russian: ЧВВМУ) is a higher naval education institution in Sevastopol which prepares prospective officers for commissions in the Russian Navy.

The school has existed since 1937, when it was formed as the Second Naval School, to supplement the M. V. Frunze Naval School in training officers for the Soviet Navy. In 1939 it was renamed the Black Sea Naval School, and then the Black Sea Higher Naval School in 1940. With the Axis invasion of the Soviet Union in 1941, in August and September that year the school was at first evacuated from Sevastopol to Rostov-on-Don, and then disbanded in November 1941. The school was re-established in 1946, and in 1952 was renamed the P. S. Nakhimov Black Sea Higher Naval School.

With the dissolution of the Soviet Union in 1991, the school became part of the newly-independent state of Ukraine. In 1992, the school was merged with the Sevastopol Higher Naval Engineering School to form the Sevastopol Naval Institute. In 1999, it was renamed the Nakhimov Sevastopol Naval Institute, and then reorganised once more in 2009 as the P.S. Nakhimov Academy of the Naval Forces of Ukraine. Following the Russian annexation of Crimea in 2014, the school came under the control of the Russian Armed Forces. Ukrainian cadets and teachers who chose not to remain were evacuated to Odesa, joining the Odesa Maritime Academy as its Naval Faculty. The school was reopened as a Russian educational facility in 2014 as the Nakhimov Black Sea Higher Naval School.

== Predecessors ==
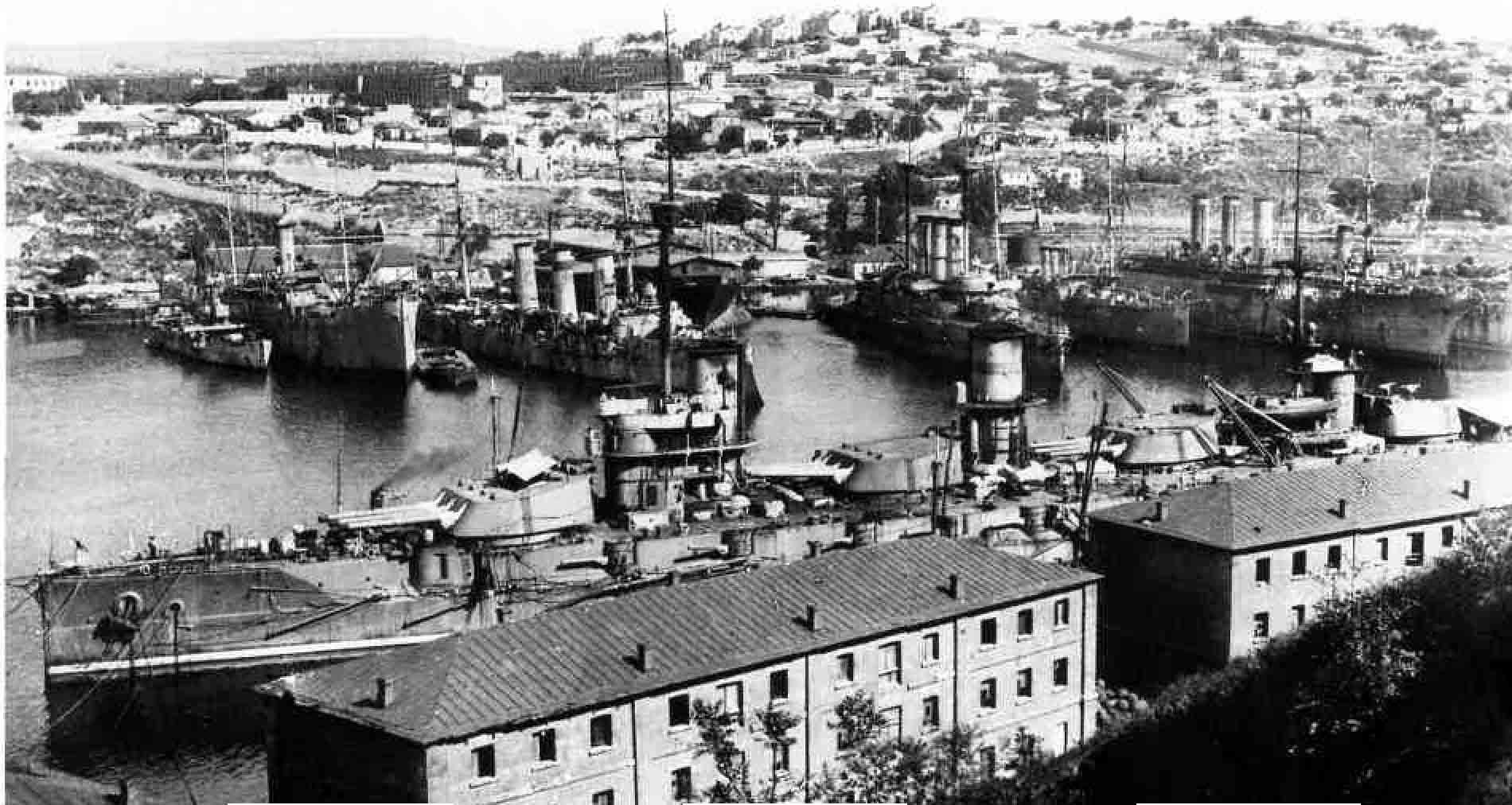
Warships in Sevastopol, 1918

The Imperial Russian government had planned to develop naval education in the Black Sea following an acute shortage of officers because of heavy losses sustained in the Russo-Japanese War. Plans were approved to create a naval cadet corps in Sevastopol, base of the Black Sea Fleet, to mirror the Naval Cadet Corps in Saint Petersburg. The Sevastopol Naval Cadet Corps was inaugurated in 1915, with construction of facilities intended to be complete by autumn 1917, but the corps was instead closed after the February Revolution that year. It was opened on 20 October 1919 during the Russian Civil War by Nikolai Mashukov, training members of the White movement for service in the fleet. Rear-Admiral Sergei Vorozheykin was appointed director of the corps. With the success of the Red Army over the Whites, the corps was evacuated to Bizerte, where the first graduation of what was now the Bizerte Naval Cadet Corps taking place in summer 1921. There were some 300 graduates from the corps before it was closed on 25 May 1925.

With the success of the Red Army in securing the ports and bases of the Black Sea, the Black Sea Fleet became a Red force, and a training detachment was created in 1920. On 18 April 1931 the Revolutionary Military Council issued Order No. 334, establishing the Sevastopol Naval School of Coastal Defence. The school occupied the buildings of the former naval barracks.

== Soviet history ==
=== Second Naval School ===
The school was created by Order No. 035 of 1 April 1937 of the Council of People's Commissars of the Soviet Union, which ordered the formation of a school in Sevastopol for "the training of command personnel for ships and parts of the fleet", to be named the Second Naval School. The navy was going through a period of expansion and it was decided to supplement the navy's only commissioning school, the M. V. Frunze Naval School in Leningrad, with a new school located at the main base of the Black Sea Fleet.

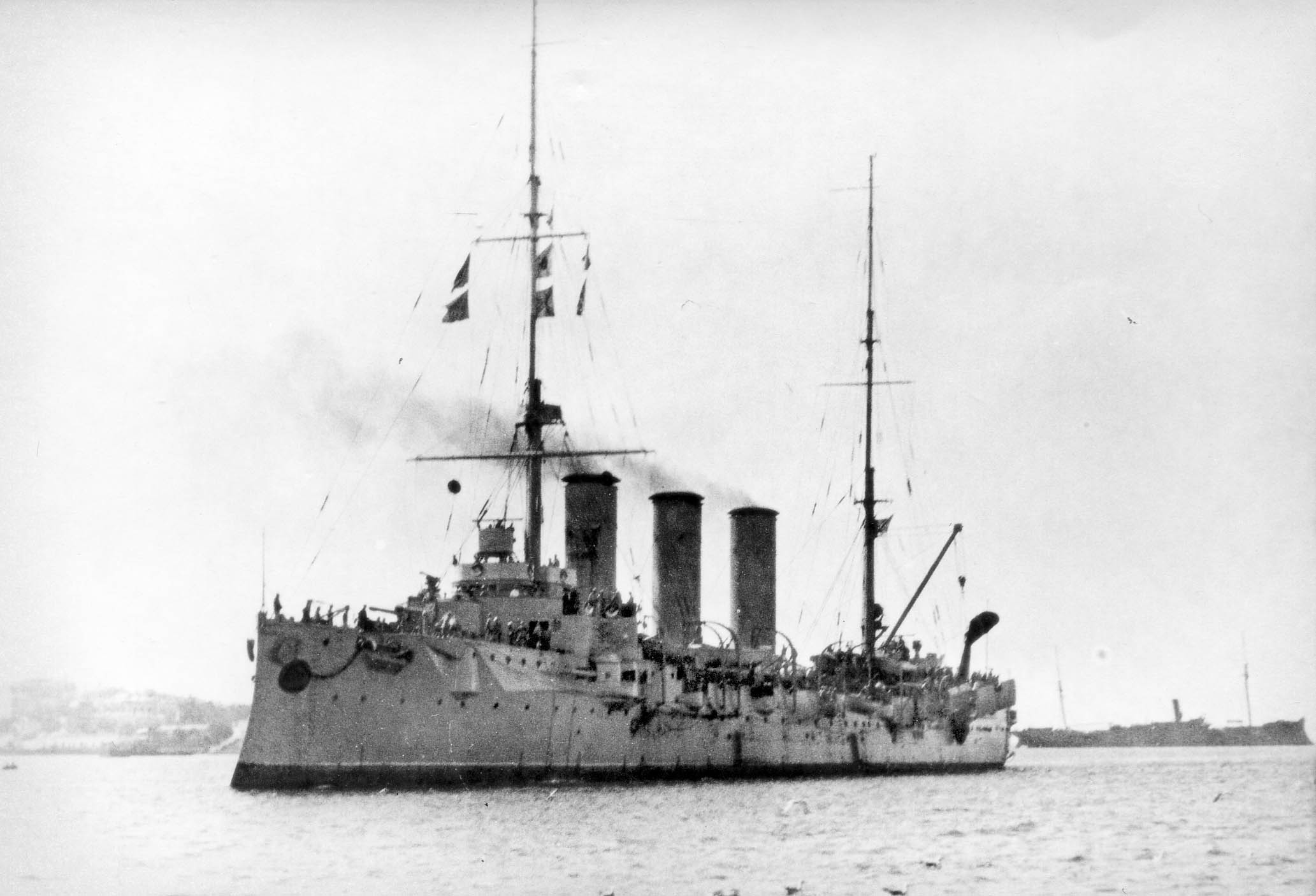
The cruiser Komintern, used for cadet training voyages

The land allocated for the school was a parcel of open land measuring 35.4 hectares between Streletskaya Bay and Pesochnaya Bay. It was occupied only by artillery battery No. 14, which was by then used by the Coastal Defence School for training. The tasks of constructing the school's facilities, securing staff and recruiting cadets was assigned to its first head, flag officer 2nd rank Yakov Ozolin. Construction began in July 1937 by the first intake of cadets and Komsomol members, with the academic year beginning on 9 November, with classes being held outdoors and in unfinished buildings. At first the cadets lived in tents that were established on a sea coast and in winter aboard the steamship Ochakov. A training cruise took place in 1938 aboard the cruiser Komintern. On 21 September 1938, Captain 3rd rank Pavel Ipatov was appointed to command the school. Further training cruises were carried out aboard the Komintern, as well as the motor vessels Neva and Dnepr, and in summer 1939 the naval department of the Coastal Defence School was transferred to the Second Naval School.

=== Black Sea Higer Naval School ===
By order of the People's Commissar of the Navy No. 241 of 25 June 1939, the Second Naval School was renamed the Black Sea Naval School. After passing inspections, and by resolution of the Council of People's Commissars No. 963 on 5 July 1940, and the order of the People's Commissar of the Navy No. 294 on 10 July 1940, the school was classed as a higher educational institution and renamed the Black Sea Higher Naval School. With the Axis invasion of the Soviet Union in June 1941, many of the cadets were called up for service in the fleets, while the remainder prepared fortifications and assisted in defending the city against air attack. By August the city was directly threatened by Axis ground forces, and orders were given to begin evacuating the school to Rostov-on-Don. By October Rostov-on-Don was also in imminent danger, and on 9 October the headquarters of the North Caucasus Military District ordered the school to be reorganized into the 6th Naval Cadet Regiment. The regiment consisted of four battalions in ten companies, comprising 1,059 cadets. The regiment was assigned to the reserve defences of the city, holding a defensive line until 24 October 1941, when they were ordered to Mineralnye Vody to be reformed. They departed the city by train on 25 October, arriving at Mineralnye Vody on 27 October.

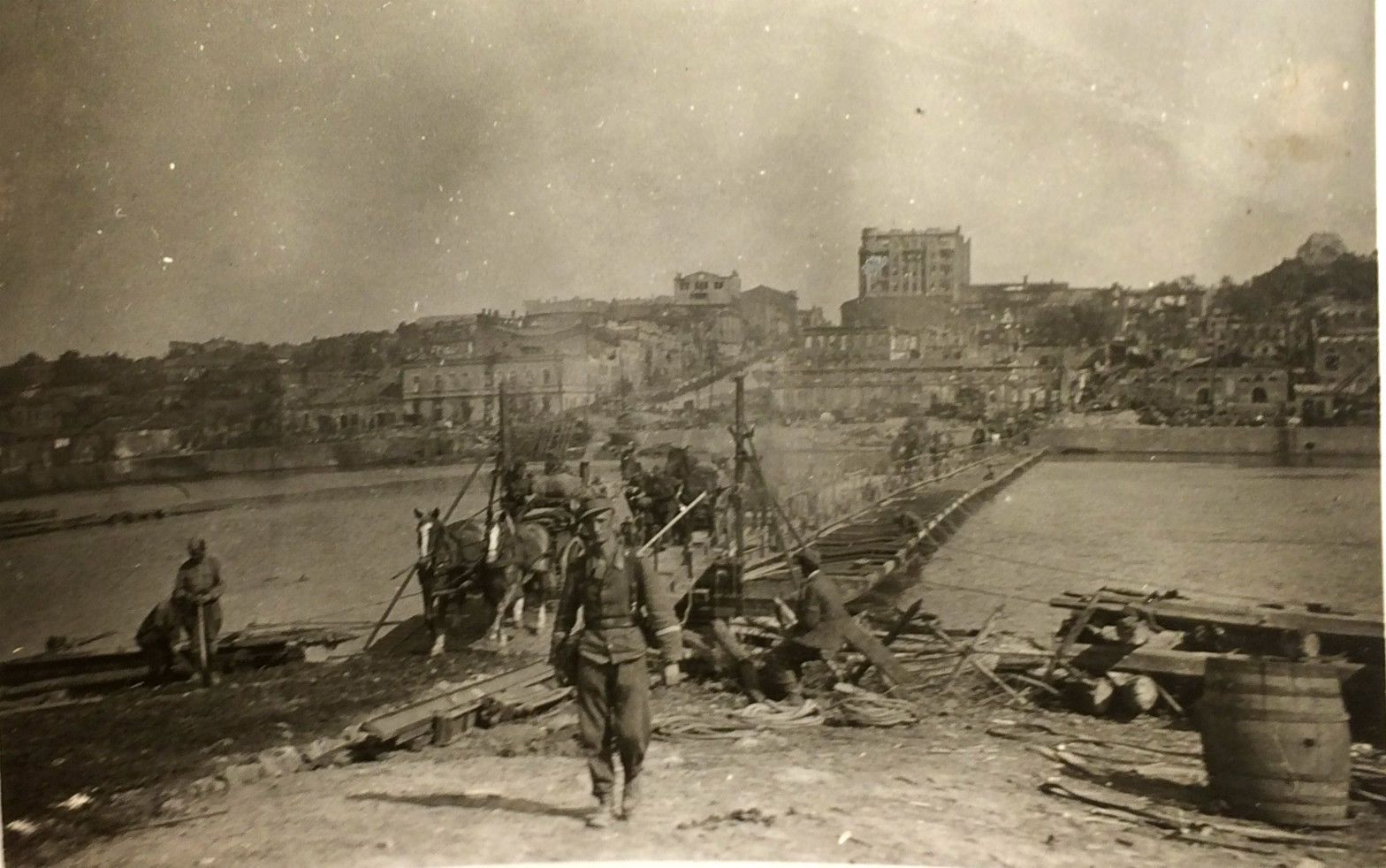
Rostov-on-Don in 1942. Cadets and staff of the former school, reformed as the 76th Naval Rifle Brigade, took part in defensive and offensive operations around the city during the war years.

With the dispatch to the front of the entire cadet force and most of the teaching staff, the People's Commissar of the Soviet Navy issued Order No. 02255 on 1 November, disbanding the Black Sea Naval School. The remaining teaching staff were transferred to other naval educational institutions, and the surviving property of the school was sent to the Caspian Higher Naval School. The cadets of the school were formed into the 76th Naval Rifle Brigade, commanded by the former head of the school, Captain 1st Rank Boris Apostoli. After being reformed and equipped at Mineralnye Vody, the brigade returned to Rostov-on-Don in January 1942. In March they were in heavy action around Matveyev Kurgan, and in July they were forced back across the Don River when the Germans captured the city. The brigade continued to serve with the 56th Army in defensive and offensive operations throughout 1942 and into 1943, until March 1943 when it and the other naval rifle brigades were disbanded and the sailors were returned to the navy. Of the 1,794 graduates of the school who served in the Soviet Armed Forces during the Second World War, thirteen were awarded the title of Hero of the Soviet Union during wartime, and two more in the post-war period. Another received the title of Hero of Socialist Labour, with five more receiving the title of Hero of the Russian Federation.

=== Post-war reconstruction ===
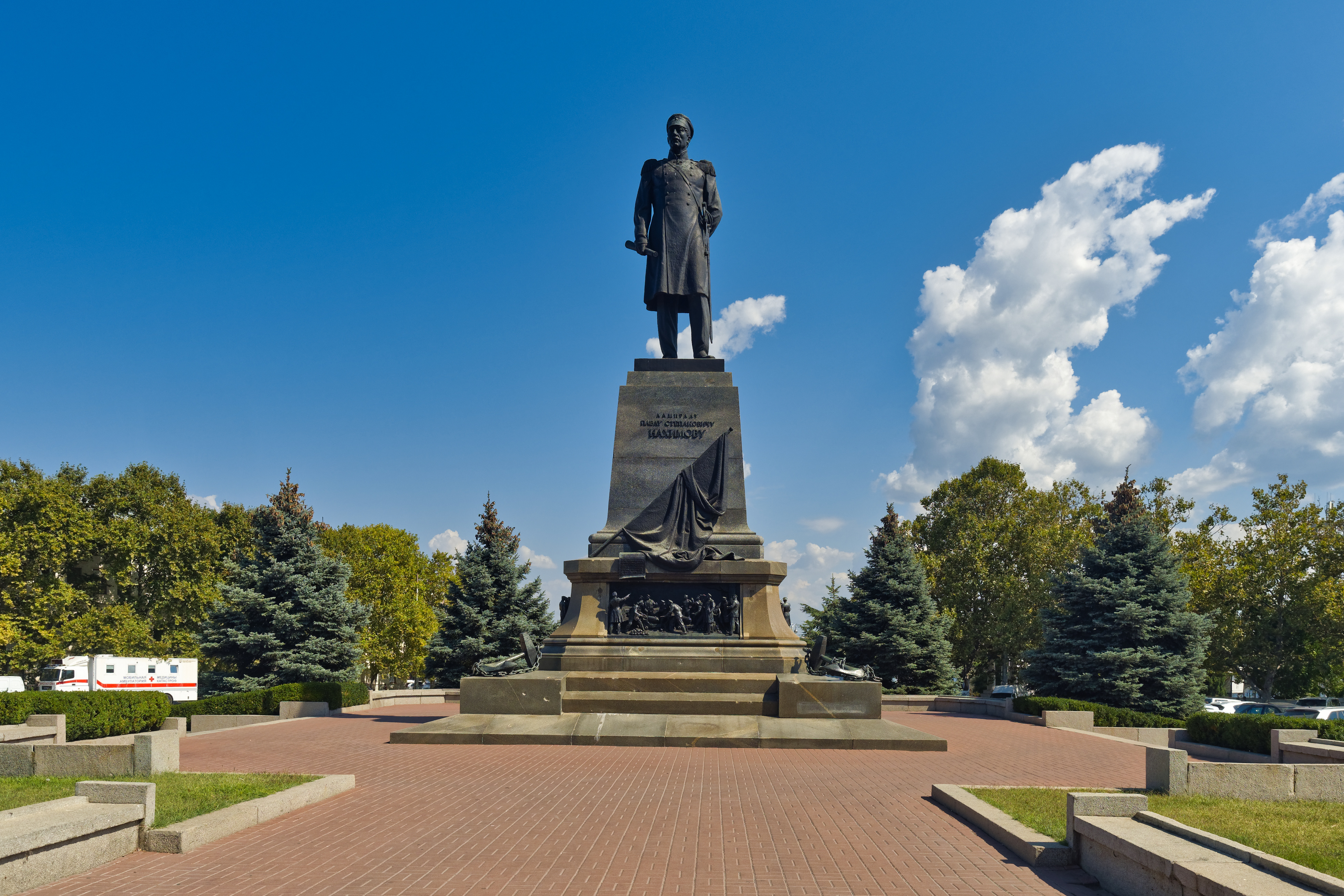
The monument to Admiral Pavel Nakhimov in Sevastopol. The school's namesake from 1952.

Sevastapol was recaptured in 1944, but had suffered heavy damage. On 4 March 1946, a new school, designated military unit 69202, was established in the city to provide a two-year training course for small ship commanders. Captain 1st Rank Yuri Ladinsky was appointed its first commander. Reconstruction of the city, naval base, and school took place, and on 26 July 1946, Captain 1st Rank Boris Nikitin was appointed the new head. 225 cadets were enrolled at the start of the academic year on 1 November 1946. On 30 April 1947, the school received its military banner from the Commander of the Black Sea Fleet, Admiral Filipp Oktyabrsky, and on 1 May 1947 the cadets took part in the city's parade for the first time since the war. On 1 September 1948 the school name was restored as the Black Sea Higher Naval School, and on 20 September 1948 Vice-Admiral Gavriil Zhukov took command of the school. His successor in 1950 was Hero of the Soviet Union Rear-Admiral Ivan Kolyshkin. By the resolution of the Council of Ministers No. 1857 on 18 April 1952, and the Order of the Minister of the Navy No. 107 on 24 April 1952, the school was renamed the P. S. Nakhimov Black Sea Higher Naval School, commemorating the 150th anniversary of the birth of Admiral Pavel Nakhimov. Kolyshkin was succeeded as head of the school by Rear-Admiral Nikolai Bogdanov in December 1953, and he in turn by Admiral Filipp Oktyabrsky in 1957.

=== Nakhimov Black Sea Higher Naval School ===
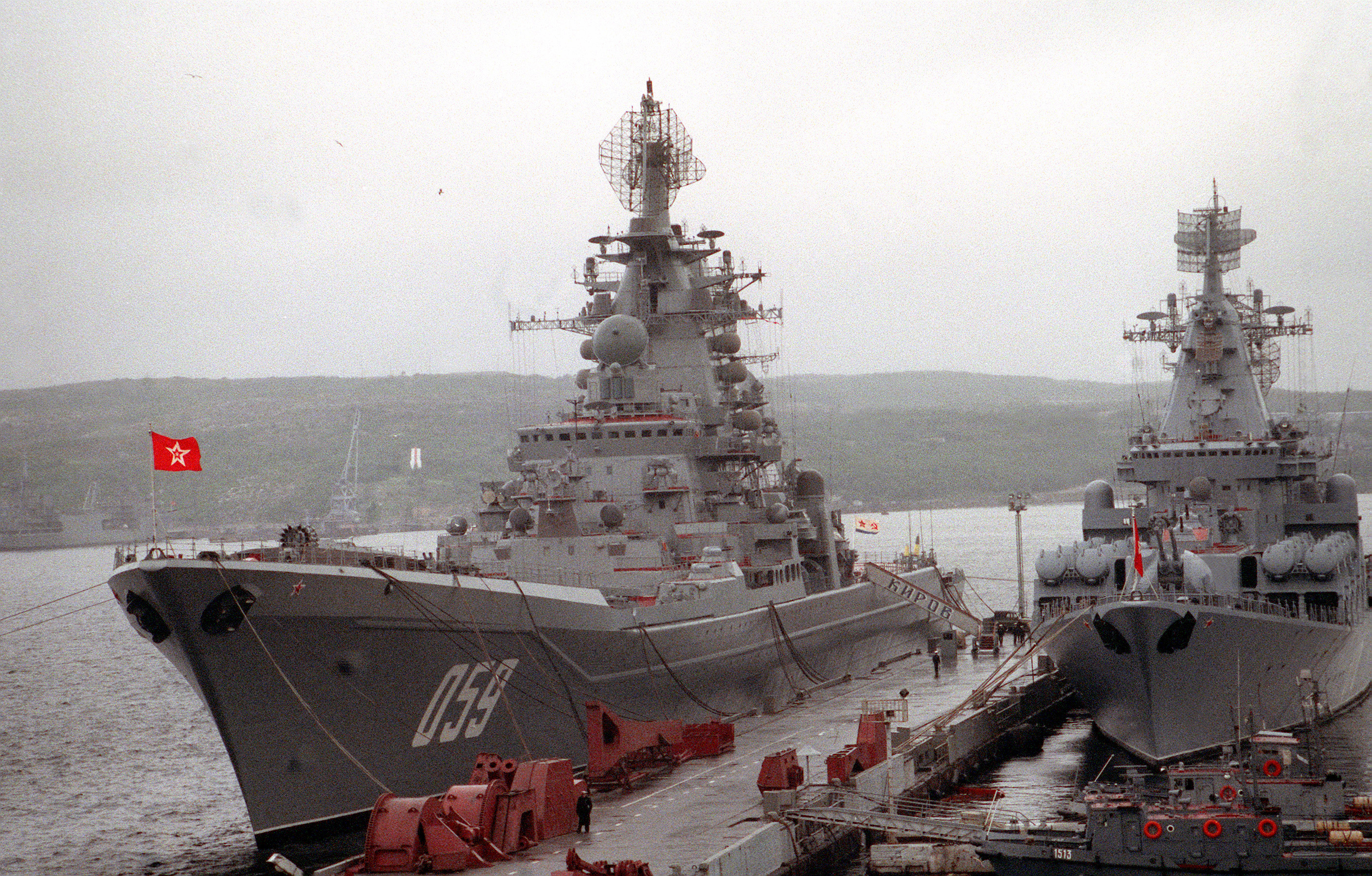
Soviet warships in port. By the late Soviet period the school was training specialists for service aboard nuclear-powered vessels armed with missiles and other modern weaponry.

In March 1960, Nakhimov Black Sea Higher Naval School was subordinated to the commander of the Black Sea Fleet, and from February 1961, the first deputy commander of the Black Sea Fleet had direct management of the school's activities. Rear-Admiral Aleksandr Kuzmin succeeded Admiral Oktyabrsky on 30 June 1960, going on to spend more than five years in command, until his death on 13 November 1965. His successor was Hero of the Soviet Union Rear-Admiral Ilya Khvorostyanov, appointed on 22 January 1966. By now the school was specialising in preparing officers for the modern ships of the fleet, with departments set up to master new technologies, especially missiles and rockets, and the uses of nuclear power and weapons. In December 1971, Rear-Admiral Stepan Sokolan took charge of the school, being promoted to vice-admiral during his tenure, on 5 November 1973. On 30 April 1975, by decree of the Presidium of the Supreme Soviet, the school was awarded the Order of the Red Star. It was presented by the Commander-in-Chief of the Navy Admiral of the Fleet of the Soviet Union Sergey Gorshkov on 19 June 1975. In August 1981, Rear-Admiral Georgy Avraamov, was appointed to the post of head of the school, being promoted to vice-admiral in October 1984. He was succeeded in August 1987 by Rear-Admiral Vladimir Denisenkov, the last head of the school before the dissolution of the Soviet Union in 1991.

== Since the fall of the USSR ==
=== Ukraine ===
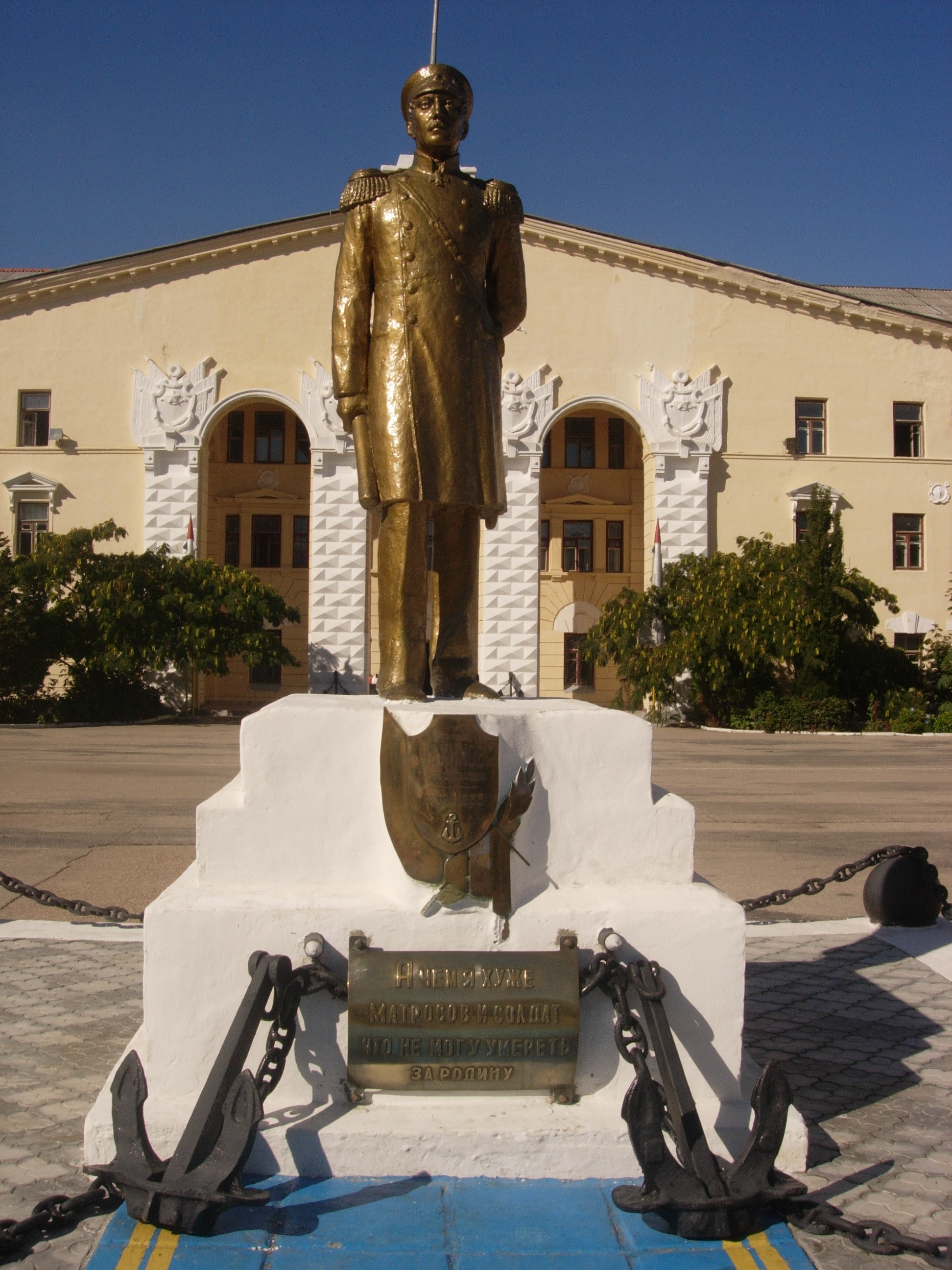
The statue of Pavel Nakhimov in front of the school, 2007

With the dissolution of the Soviet Union and the emergence of the independent states of Russia and Ukraine, the question of ownership of the former-Soviet military units and facilities on the territory of the former Soviet Republics became a pressing issue. The Black Sea Fleet, and its related facilities and personnel were the subject of high-level discussions between the new Russian and Ukrainian governments. While discussions were taking place, Ukrainian defence minister Kostyantyn Morozov issued orders to carry out the 5 April 1992 decree No. 209 of the President of Ukraine to place the Sevastopol Higher Naval Engineering School and the Nakhimov Black Sea Higher Naval School under the authority of the Ukrainian Defence Ministry's military education department. The Commander of the Ukrainian Navy, Rear-Admiral Boris Kozhin, duly appointed Captain 1st Rank Viktor Makarov as head of the Nakhimov Black Sea Higher Naval School on 17 July 1992. The Cabinet of Ministers of Ukraine issued resolution No. 490 on 19 August 1992, merging the Sevastopol Higher Naval Engineering School and the Nakhimov Black Sea Higher Naval School into the Sevastopol Naval Institute. Cadets who preferred to leave rather than join the Ukrainian Armed Forces were transferred to other naval educational institutions in Russia. On 14 January 1993 the Nakhimov Black Sea Higher Naval School was officially disbanded by directive of the Russian General Staff of the Armed Forces.

On 17 September 1994, by the directive of the Head of the General Staff of the Armed Forces of Ukraine, Colonel General Anatoly Lopata, a command faculty was created in the school to train officers at the operational-tactical level. On 8 October 1994, the Battle Banner was awarded to the Sevastopol Naval Institute. On 20 July 1999 the institute was renamed the Nakhimov Sevastopol Naval Institute. In 2009 the naval institute was renamed the Nakhimov Naval Academy.

=== Since 2014 ===
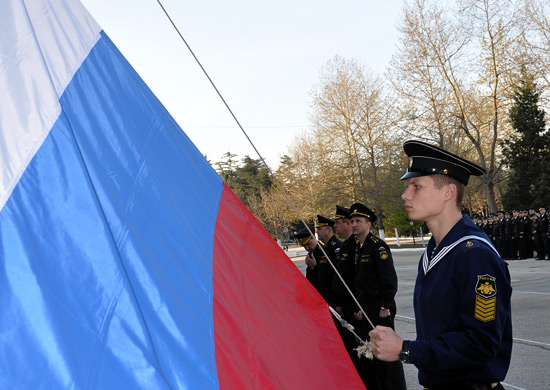
Raising of the Russian flag at the school

During the annexation of Crimea by the Russian Federation, Russian forces began blockading the Nakhimov Naval Academy by land and sea from 27 February 2014. On 20 March Russian command over the academy was established, and cadets and teaching staff who chose not to stay left for Odesa. With the de facto annexation by early April, staff and some 200 students who wished to remain with Ukraine were transferred to Odesa. On 4 June 2014 this was confirmed in an order by the Russian government, while on the same day the resolution No. 163 of the Cabinet of Ministers of Ukraine disbanded the Nakhimov Naval Academy, and established the Naval Faculty at the Odesa National Maritime Academy. This was, on 13 July 2016, reorganized into the Institute of Naval Forces of the Odesa Maritime Academy.

Once more named the Nakhimov Black Sea Higher Naval School, it received a new battle flag from Deputy Commander-in-Chief of the Russian Navy Vice-Admiral Aleksandr Fedotenkov on 13 May 2014, and on 18 June 2014 the first graduation for sailors into the Russian Navy was held. On 1 September 2022, by decree of the President of the Russian Federation, the school was awarded the Order of Nakhimov. The award was presented by Commander-in-Chief of the Navy Admiral Nikolai Yevmenov.

== Commanders ==
=== Soviet Union ===
- Flagman 2nd Rank Yakov Ozolin (May 1937 - July 1938)
- Captain 1st Rank Pavel Ipatov (September 1938 - September 1940)
- Rear-Admiral Valentin Drozd (November 1940 - February 1941)
- Captain 1st Rank Boris Apostoli (March 1941 - November 1941)
- Captain 1st Rank Yuri Ladinsky (March 1946 - July 1946)
- Captain 1st Rank Boris Nikitin (July 1946 - September 1948)
- Rear-Admiral Gavriil Zhukov (September 1948 - September 1950)
- Rear-Admiral Ivan Kolyshkin (September 1950 - December 1953)
- Rear-Admiral Nikolai Bogdanov (December 1953 - May 1957)
- Admiral Filipp Oktyabrsky (May 1957 - June 1960)
- Vice-Admiral Aleksandr Kuzmin (June 1960 - November 1965)
- Vice-Admiral Ilya Khvorostyanov (January 1966 - December 1971)
- Vice-Admiral Stepan Sokolan (December 1971 - July 1981)
- Vice-Admiral Georgy Avraamov (August 1981 - August 1987)
- Rear-Admiral Vladimir Denisenkov (August 1987 - August 1992)

=== Ukraine ===
- Rear-Admiral Viktor Makarov (August 1992 - 1996)
- Rear-Admiral Vyacheslav Sychev (1996-1998)
- Rear-Admiral Volodymyr Kolpakov (1998-2004)
- Rear-Admiral Viktor Nosenko (2004-2006)
- Rear-Admiral Serhii Taranenko (2006-2010)
- Captain 1st Rank Petro Goncharenko (2010-2012)
- Captain 1st Rank Oleksiy Neizhpapa (2012-2014)
- Captain 1st Rank Petro Goncharenko (2014) (acting)

=== Russia ===
- Captain 1st Rank Aleksandr Grinkevich (20 March 2014 - 25 March 2014) (acting)
- Rear-Admiral Igor Smolyak (25 March 2014 - May 2015)
- Rear-Admiral Aleksandr Grinkevich (May 2015 - present)
