= Soviet frigate Retivyy =

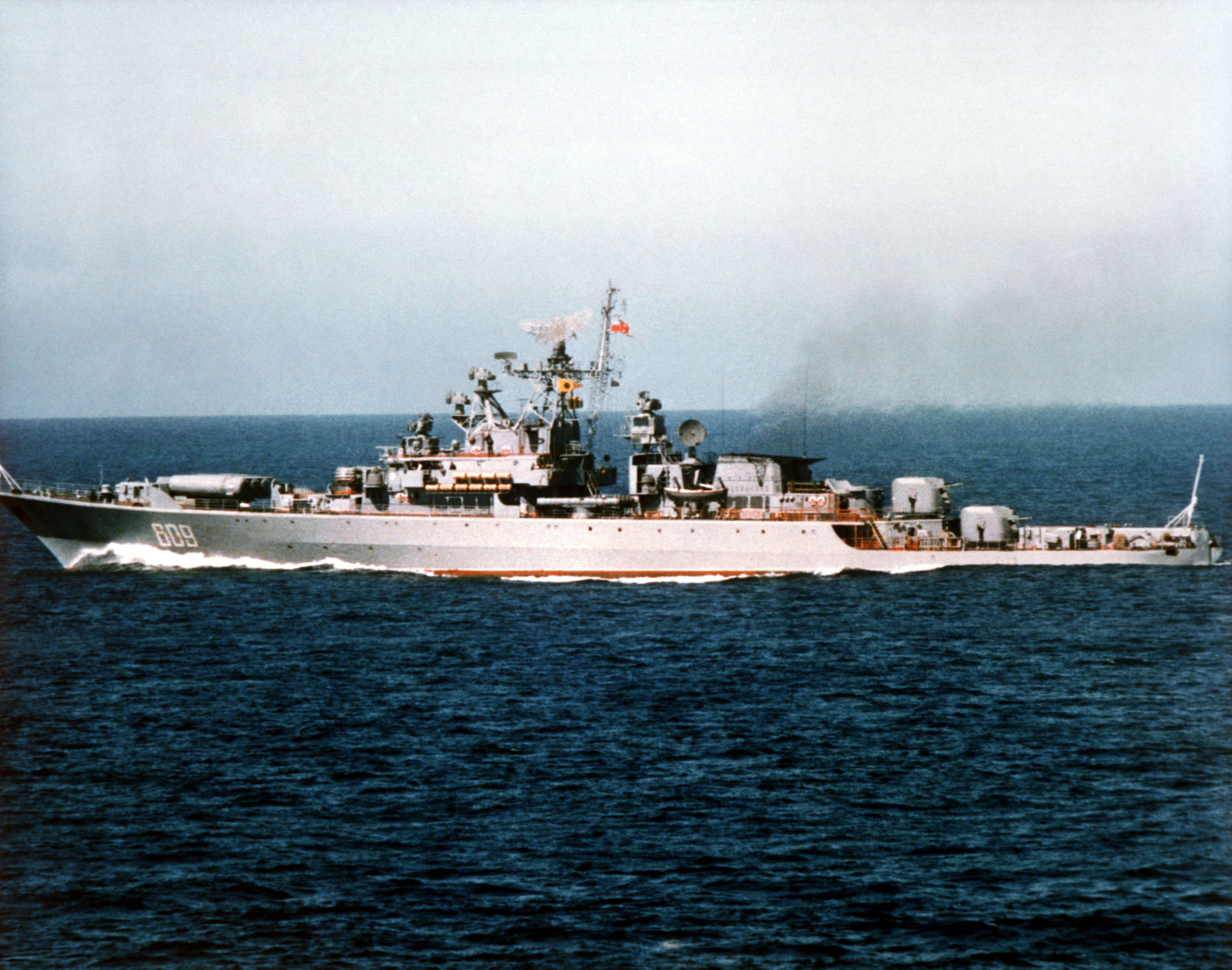
- Retivyy on 23 December 1985.

History

Soviet Union
- Name: Retivyy
- Namesake: Russian for Ardent
- Builder: A.A. Zhdanov, Leningrad
- Yard number: 712
- Laid down: 12 June 1974
- Launched: 14 August 1976
- Commissioned: 28 December 1976
- Decommissioned: 4 August 1995
- Fate: Scrapped

General characteristics
- Class & type: Project 1135 Burevestnik frigate
- Displacement: 2,835 tonnes (2,790 long tons; 3,125 short tons) standard, 3,190 tonnes (3,140 long tons; 3,520 short tons) full load
- Length: 123 m (404 ft)
- Beam: 142 m (466 ft)
- Draft: 4.5 m (15 ft)
- Propulsion: 2 shaft; COGAG; 2 x M-8K gas-turbines, 34,000 shp (25,000 kW); 2 x M-62 gas-turbines (cruise), 12,000 shp (8,900 kW)
- Speed: 32 knots (59 km/h)
- Range: 4,000 nmi (7,408 km) at 14 knots (26 km/h)
- Complement: 23 officers, 169 men
- Sensors & processing systems: MR-310A Angara-A air/surface search radar, Volga navigation radar, Don navigation radar, MG-332 Titan-2, MG-325 Vega, 2 MG-7 Braslet and MGS-400K sonars
- Electronic warfare & decoys: PK-16 ship-borne decoy dispenser system
- Armament: 4 × URPK-4 Metel (SS-N-14 'Silex') anti-submarine missiles (1x4); 4 × ZIF-122 4K33 launchers (22) with 40 4K33 OSA-M (SA-N-4 'Gecko') surface to air missiles (2x2); 4 × 76 mm (3 in) AK-726 guns (2×2); 2 × 45 mm (2 in) 21KM guns (2x1); 2 × RBU-6000 Smerch-2 Anti-Submarine rockets; 8 × 533 mm (21 in) torpedo tubes (2x4); 18 mines

Retivyy (Russian: Ретивый, "Ardent") was a Project 1135 Burevestnik-class Guard Ship (Сторожевой Корабль, SKR) or Krivak-class frigate. With an armament based around the URPK-4 Metel anti-submarine missile system, the vessel served with the Pacific Fleet of the Soviet and Russian Navies. The ship was launched on 14 August 1976 by A.A. Zhdanov in Leningrad, the second of the class built by the shipyard. After joining the fleet, the vessel took part in the search for the crew of the crashed Lockheed P-3 Orion AF 586. In 1981, the vessel sailed as part of a task force along the west coast of the United States to test and measure American defences. Decommissioned on 4 August 1995, the vessel was subsequently sold to a South Korean company to be broken up.

== Design ==
Designed by N.P. Sobolov, Retivyy was the twelfth Project 1135 Guard Ship (Сторожевой Корабль, SKR) to be launched, and the second from the shipyard of A.A. Zhdanov in Leningrad. The vessel is named for a Russian word which can be translated as "ardent". Retivyy served with the Soviet Navy, and the Russian Navy after the dissolution of the Soviet Union, as an anti-submarine frigate. The ship was designed to create safe areas for friendly ballistic missile submarines close to the coast.

Displacing 2,835 tonnes (2,790 long tons; 3,125 short tons) standard and 3,190 tonnes (3,140 long tons; 3,520 short tons) full load, Retivyy had an overall length of 123 metres (404 ft), with a beam of 14.2 m (46 ft 7 in) and a draught of 4.5 m (14 ft 9 in). Power was provided by a combination of two 17,000 horsepower (13,000 kW) M8K and two 6,000 horsepower (4,500 kW) M62 gas turbines installed as a COGAG set named М7K, driving two fixed pitch screws, for a design speed of 32 knots (59 km/h). Range was 4,000 nautical miles (7,408 km) at 14 knots (26 km/h), 3,515 nmi (6,510 km) at 18 knots (33 km/h), 3,155 nmi (5,843 km) at 24 knots (44 km/h) and 1,240 nmi (2,296 km) at 32 knots (59 km/h). The ship had a complement of 192, including 23 officers.

The ship was designed for anti-submarine warfare around four URPK-4 Metel missiles (NATO reporting name SS-N-14 'Silex') mounted on the foredeck. The missiles were backed up by a pair of quadruple 533-millimetre (21 in) torpedo tubes and a pair of RBU-6000 213 mm (8 in) Smerch-2 anti-submarine rocket launchers mounted forward of the bridge. Defence against aircraft was provided by forty 4K33 OSA-MA (SA-N-4 'Gecko') surface to air missiles which were launched from two twin ZIF-122 launchers, one mounted forward and the other aft. Two twin 76 mm (3 in) AK-726 guns were mounted aft, along with two single 45 mm (2 in) 21 km guns on the superstructure. Mines were also carried, either eighteen IGDM-500 KSM, fourteen KAM, fourteen KB Krab, ten Serpey, four PMR-1, seven PMR-2, seven MTPK-1, fourteen RM-1 or twelve UDM-2.

The ship had a well-equipped sensor suite, including a single MR-310A Angara-A air/surface search radar, Volga navigation radar, Don navigation radar, MP-401S Start-S ESM radar system, Nickel-KM and Kremniyy IFF and ARP-50R radio direction finder. An extensive sonar complement was fitted, including MG-332 Titan-2, MG-325 Vega and MGS-400K, along with two MG-7 Braslet anti-saboteur sonars and the MG-26 Hosta underwater communication system. The ship was also fitted with the PK-16 ship-borne decoy dispenser system.

== Service ==
Retivyy was laid down by A.A. Zhdanov in Leningrad on 12 June 1974, the second of the class to be ordered from the shipbuilder, and was given the yard number 712. Launched on 14 August 1976 and commissioned later that year on 28 December, the ship was accepted into the Pacific Fleet on 5 February 1977 as part of the 173th Brigade and operated in the Atlantic, Indian and Pacific Oceans. On 30 October 1978, the ship participated in the search for the crew of the Lockheed P-3 Orion AF 586 from VP-9 that had crashed off the coast of the Kamchatka Peninsula.

In 1979 Retivyy participated in operations in the Indian Ocean with Razumnyy and Rezkiy, along with Project 641 submarines B-33 and B-112. Shortly afterwards, alerted by submarine K-314, the ship joined Razumnyy, Rezkiy and the submarines B-33 and B-112 to search for a ballistic missile submarine of the United States Navy that the Soviet Navy detected crossing their anti-submarine barrier. The search took place between 22 and 34 March. The following year, between 25 August and 22 September, the vessel sailed with Rezkiy again, but this time as part of a task force led by the Project 1134B Berkut B vessel Petropavlovsk, from the Aleutian Islands south along the west coast of the United States. The purpose of the voyage was to test and measure the US response. Later, Retivyy underwent anti-submarine training with Razumnyy in 1988. With the dissolution of the Soviet Union on 26 December 1991, the ship was transferred to the Russian Navy. Soon after, the ship was retired. Decommissioned on 4 August 1995, Retivyy was stricken on 3 September and sold to a South Korean company to be broken up.

== Pennant numbers ==
Pennant number	Date
591	
217	
601	1979
616	1981
609	1984
628	1987
602	1990
670	1990
605	1995
