= Soviet frigate Rezkiy =

Anti-submarine ship

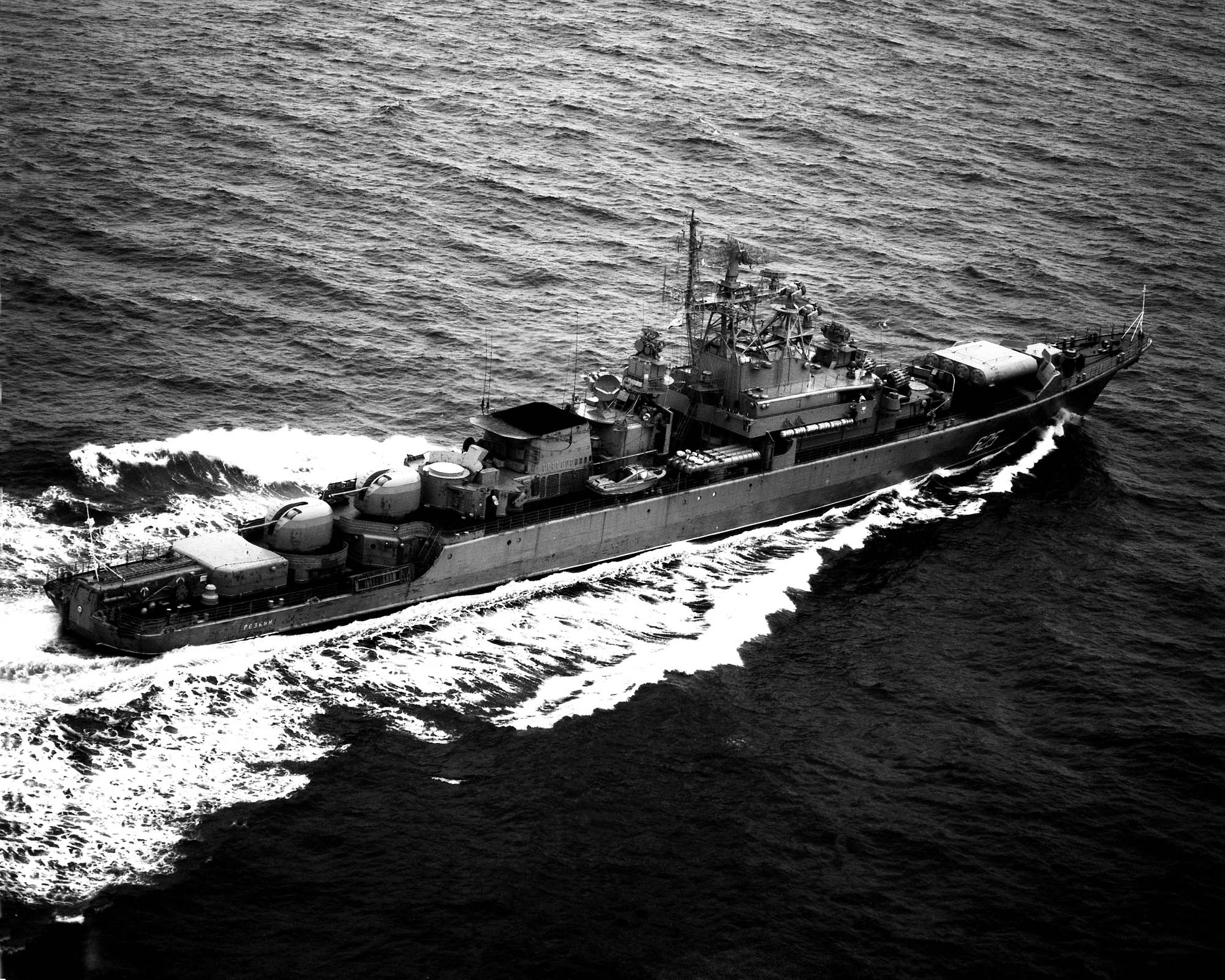
- Rezkiy in 1990.

History

Soviet Union
- Name: Rezkiy
- Namesake: Russian for Active
- Builder: Yantar Shipyard, Kaliningrad
- Yard number: 160
- Laid down: 28 July 1974
- Launched: 17 February 1976
- Commissioned: 30 September 1976
- Decommissioned: 4 August 1995
- Fate: Broken up

General characteristics
- Class & type: Project 1135M Burevestnik frigate
- Displacement: 2,935 tonnes (2,889 long tons; 3,235 short tons) standard, 3,305 tonnes (3,253 long tons; 3,643 short tons) full load
- Length: 123 m (404 ft)
- Beam: 142 m (466 ft)
- Draft: 4.5 m (15 ft)
- Propulsion: 2 shaft; COGAG; 2x M-8K gas-turbines, 34,000 shp; 2x M-62 gas-turbines (cruise), 12,000 shp
- Speed: 32 knots (59 km/h)
- Range: 3,515 nmi (6,510 km) at 18 knots (33 km/h)
- Complement: 23 officers, 173 men
- Sensors & processing systems: MR-310A Angara-A air/surface search radar, Volga navigation radar, Don navigation radar, MG-332 Titan-2, MG-329 Bronza, 2 MG-7 Braslet and MGS-400K sonars
- Electronic warfare & decoys: PK-16 ship-borne decoy dispenser system
- Armament: 4× URPK-4 Metel (SS-N-14 'Silex') anti-submarine missiles (1x4); 4× ZIF-122 4K33 launchers (22) with 40 4K33 OSA-M (SA-N-4 'Gecko') surface to air missiles (2×2); 4× 76 mm (3 in) AK-726 guns (2×2); 2× RBU-6000 Smerch-2 Anti-Submarine rockets; 8× 533 mm (21 in) torpedo tubes (2x4); 18 mines

Rezkiy (Russian: Резкий, "Sharp") was a Project 1135M large anti-submarine ship (Большой Противолодочный Корабль, BPK) or Krivak-class frigate of the Soviet Navy. With an armament based around the URPK-4 Metel anti-submarine missile system, the vessel was launched on 17 February 1975. Joining the Pacific Fleet on 2 February the following year, the ship operated primarily in the Indian Ocean, including visits to Ethiopia, India and Mauritius. The vessel was also involved in tracking the cruisers USS Arkansas and USS Fox, as well as searching for a submarine that crossed the Soviet anti-submarine barrier in 1980. In 1981, the vessel sailed as part of a task force along the west coast of the United States to test and measure American defences. After the dissolution of the Soviet Union, the ship joined the Russian Navy. Later that decade, the vessel was rearmed with the URPK-5 Rastrub which provided greater anti-ship capability to the vessel. After nearly twenty years in service, 4 August 1995, Rezkiy was decommissioned and subsequently broken up.

== Design and development ==
Designed by N.P. Sobolov, Rezkiy was the second Project 1135M Large Anti-Submarine Ship (Большой Противолодочный Корабль, BPK) laid down and the eleventh one launched. The vessel is named for a Russian word which can be translated sharp, cutting or sudden. Rezkiy served with the Soviet Navy, and the Russian Navy after the dissolution of the Soviet Union, as an anti-submarine frigate. The ship was redesignated a Guard Ship (Сторожевой Корабль, SKR) from 28 July 1977 to reflect the change in Soviet strategy of creating protected areas for friendly submarines close to the coast.

Rezkiy displaced 2,935 tonnes (2,889 long tons; 3,235 short tons) standard and 3,305 t (3,253 long tons; 3,643 short tons) full load. Length overall was 123 metres (404 ft), with a beam of 14.2 m (46 ft 7 in) and a draught of 4.5 m (14 ft 9 in). Power was provided by a combination of two 17,000 horsepower (13,000 kW) M38K and two 6,000 hp (4,500 kW) M62 gas turbines installed as a COGAG set named М7K, which enabled the ship to achieve a design speed of 32 knots (59 km/h). Range was 4,000 nautical miles (7,408 km) at 14 knots (26 km/h), 3,515 nmi (6,510 km) at 18 knots (33 km/h), 3,155 nmi (5,843 km) at 24 knots (44 km/h) and 1,240 nmi (2,296 km) at 32 knots (59 km/h). The ship's complement was 196, including 23 officers.

The ship was designed for anti-submarine warfare around four URPK-4 Metel missiles (NATO reporting name SS-N-14 Silex), backed up by a pair of quadruple 533 millimetres (21.0 in) torpedoes and a pair of RBU-6000 213 mm (8 in) Smerch-2 anti-submarine rocket launchers. The main armament was upgraded to URPK-5 Rastrub (SS-N-14B) from 1984, which provided a much increased anti-ship capacity. Defence against aircraft was provided by forty 4K33 OSA-M (SA-N-4 Gecko) surface to air missiles which were launched from four ZIF-122 launchers. Two twin 76 mm (3 in) AK-726 guns were mounted aft. Mines awere also carried, either eighteen IGDM-500 KSM, fourteen KAM, fourteen KB Krab, ten Serpey, four PMR-1, seven PMR-2, seven MTPK-1, fourteen RM-1 mines or twelve UDM-2.

The ship had a well-equipped sensor suite, including a single MR-310A Angara-A air/surface search radar, Volga navigation radar, Don navigation radar, MP-401S Start-S ESM radar system, Nickel-KM and Khrom-KM IFF and ARP-50R radio direction finder. An extensive sonar complement was fitted, including MG-332 Titan-2, MG-329 Bronza and MGS-400K, along with two MG-7 Braslet anti-saboteur sonars and the MG-26 Hosta underwater communication system. The ship was also fitted with the PK-16 ship-borne decoy dispenser system.

== Construction and career ==
Rezkiy was laid down by Yantar Shipyard in Kaliningrad on 28 July 1974, the second of the class, and was given the yard number 160. Launched on 17 February 1976 and commissioned on 30 December that year, Rezkiy was accepted into the Baltic Fleet on 1 November 1976 but almost immediately left and sailed, circumnavigating Africa, to Vladivostok, briefly operating in the southwestern Atlantic and the Indian Ocean along the way. Transferred to the Pacific Fleet to join the 173rd Brigade on 2 February the following year, the ship returned to the Indian Ocean later that year for the first of many stints, calling in at Mumbai between 16 and 21 December. After a short operation in the Sea of Okhotsk, the vessel returned once again to the area. Joining with the Project 1135 ship Soviet frigate Razumnyy, Rezkiy spent much of the next year tracking the cruiser USS Fox, along with a visit to Aden, South Yemen from 15 to 24 August. The next year also saw the ship exercising.

The 1980s started with a new area of operations. Alerted by submarine K-314, the ship joined Razumnyy, Retivyy and the submarines B-33 and B-112 to search for a US Navy ballistic missile submarine that the Soviet Navy detected crossing their anti-submarine barrier. The search took place between 22 and 34 March. The following year, between 25 August and 22 September, the vessel sailed with Retivyy again, but this time as part of a task force led by the Project 1134B Berkut B vessel Petropavlovsk, from the Aleutian Islands south along the west coast of the United States. The purpose of the voyage was to test and measure the US response. However, soon afterwards, the ship returned to the Indian Ocean. Between 16 and 20 February 1984, Rezkiy was to be found visiting Massaua, Ethiopia, and between 22 and 25 May was in Port Louis, Mauritius. Later, between 17 and 21 May 1987, the ship was back in the Sea of Okhotsk tracking the nuclear powered cruiser USS Arkansas which twice violated Soviet territorial waters.

After the dissolution of the Soviet Union on 26 December 1991, the ship served with the Russian Navy. On 4 August 1995, Rezkiy was decommissioned and, on 7 September 1996, sold to a South Korean company to be broken up.

== Selected pennant numbers ==
Pennant number	Date
215	1976
212	1977
210	1977
620	1986
625	1988
657	1990
660	
690	
