= Russian destroyer Bystry =

Sovremenny-class destroyer of the Russian Navy

Coordinates: 43.1118729°N 131.8878362°E

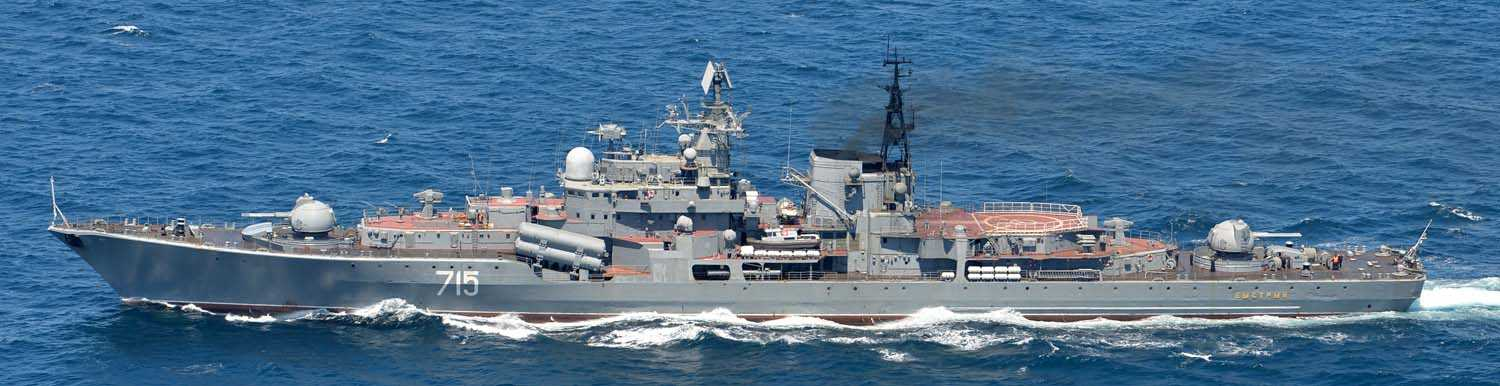
- Bystry on 15 July 2015

History

Soviet Union → Russia
- Name: Bystry; (Быстрый)
- Namesake: Quick in Russian
- Builder: Zhdanov Shipyard, Leningrad
- Laid down: 29 October 1985
- Launched: 28 November 1987
- Commissioned: 30 September 1989
- Home port: Vladivostok
- Identification: Pennant number: 676, 715, 786
- Status: Decommissioned

General characteristics
- Class & type: Sovremenny-class destroyer
- Displacement: 6,600 tons standard, 8,480 tons full load
- Length: 156 m (511 ft 10 in)
- Beam: 17.3 m (56 ft 9 in)
- Draught: 6.5 m (21 ft 4 in)
- Propulsion: 2 shaft steam turbines, 4 boilers, 75,000 kW (100,000 hp), 2 fixed propellers, 2 turbo generators, and 2 diesel generators
- Speed: 32.7 knots (60.6 km/h; 37.6 mph)
- Range: 3,920 nmi (7,260 km; 4,510 mi) at 18 knots (33 km/h; 21 mph); 1,345 nmi (2,491 km; 1,548 mi) at 33 knots (61 km/h; 38 mph)
- Complement: 350
- Sensors & processing systems: Radar: Air target acquisition radar, 3 × navigation radars, 130 mm gun fire-control radars, 30 mm air-defence gun fire control radar; Sonar: Active and passive under-keel sonar; ES: Tactical situation plotting board, anti-ship missile fire control system, air defence, missile fire-control system, and torpedo fire control system
- Electronic warfare & decoys: 2 PK-2 decoy dispensers (200 rockets)
- Armament: Guns: 4 (2 × 2) AK-130 130 mm naval guns; 4 × 30 mm AK-630 CIWS; Missiles; 8 (2 × 4) (SS-N-22 'Sunburn') anti-ship missiles; 48 (2 × 24) SA-N-7 'Gadfly' surface-to-air missiles; Anti-submarine: 2 × 2 533 mm torpedo tubes; 2 × 6 RBU-1000 300 mm anti-submarine rocket launchers
- Aircraft carried: 1× Ka-27 series helicopter
- Aviation facilities: Helipad

Bystry was a Sovremenny-class destroyer of the Soviet and later Russian navy.

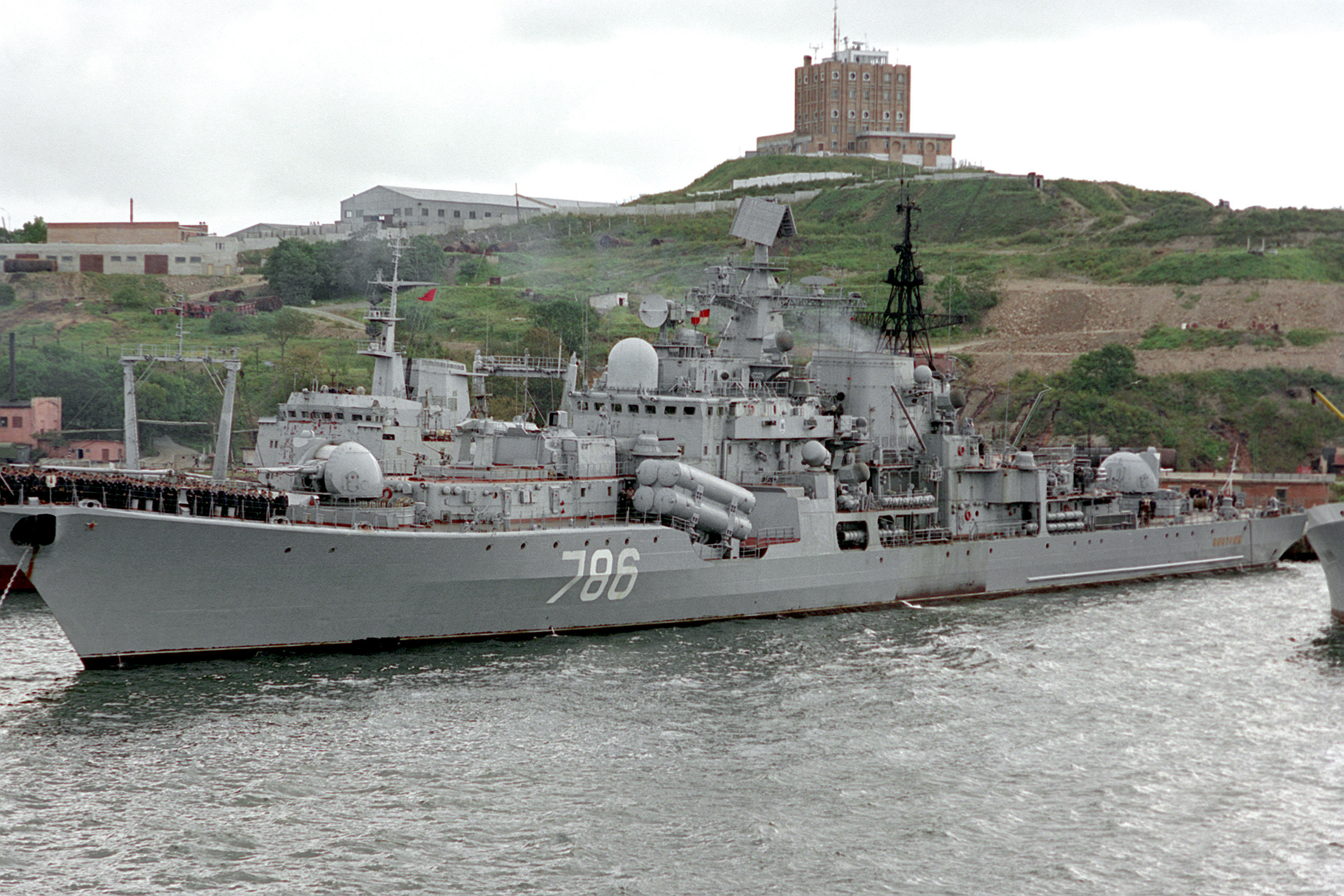
Bystry on 9 September 1992

== Development and design ==
Project began in the late 1960s when it was becoming obvious in the Soviet Navy that naval guns still had an important role particularly in support of amphibious landings, but existing gun cruisers and destroyers were showing their age. A new design was started, employing a new 130 mm automatic gun turret.

The ships are 156 metres (511 ft 10 in) in length, with a beam of 17.3 metres (56 ft 9 in) and a draught of 6.5 metres (21 ft 4 in).

== Construction and career ==
Bystry was laid down on 29 October 1985 and launched on 28 November 1987 by Zhdanov Shipyard in Leningrad. She was commissioned on 30 September 1989.

On 24 September 2010 a fire broke out on the ship. A fuel pipeline burst in the engine room before the Bystry left the harbor and a fire broke out due to a spark from a short circuit. One of five mechanics in the engine room at the time, Aldar Tsydenzhapov, rushed to shut off the fuel supply to the boiler, preventing a potentially disastrous explosion. The valve Aldar Tsydenzhapov closed was located inside the fire and he was badly burned during the roughly nine seconds that he spent working on the valve before rushing out of the room. He was taken to the hospital of the Pacific Fleet in Vladivostok and died four days later on 28 September. He had less than a month to serve at the time of his death. His name was kept on the crew list of the destroyer Bystry and his bed was maintained and unused. He received a posthumous honor for the act. He was posthumously awarded the Gold Star of the Hero of the Russian Federation for his role in extinguishing the fire and preventing an explosion.

From 3 to 28 June 2013, a detachment of ships – Bystry, Oslyabya and Kalar – left Vladivostok and participated in the military-historical naval Campaign of Memory dedicated to the victory in the Great Patriotic War, the 282nd anniversary of the Pacific Fleet, and the 200th anniversary of the birth of Admiral G. I. Nevelskoy. The route of the campaign was Vladivostok - Nevelsk - Yuzhno-Kurilsk - Severo-Kurilsk - Vilyuchinsk - Okhotsk - Korsakov - Yuzhno-Sakhalinsk - Vladivostok. The ships covered 4,200 miles in 25 days.

As of the beginning of 2015, since its construction, the ship has covered 43,792 nautical miles, 13 people from the ship's crews have been awarded government awards.

On 27 January 2016, the destroyer arrived at its home port, Vladivostok. According to the results of 2016, the destroyer crew became the best among the missile and artillery ships of rank 1-2 of the Russian Navy in the competition for the prize of the Commander-in-Chief of the Russian Navy.

The ship was reported to have decommissioned as of January 2022.
