= Vladimir Korolyov =

Russian Admiral (born 1955)

- Владимир Иванович Королёв
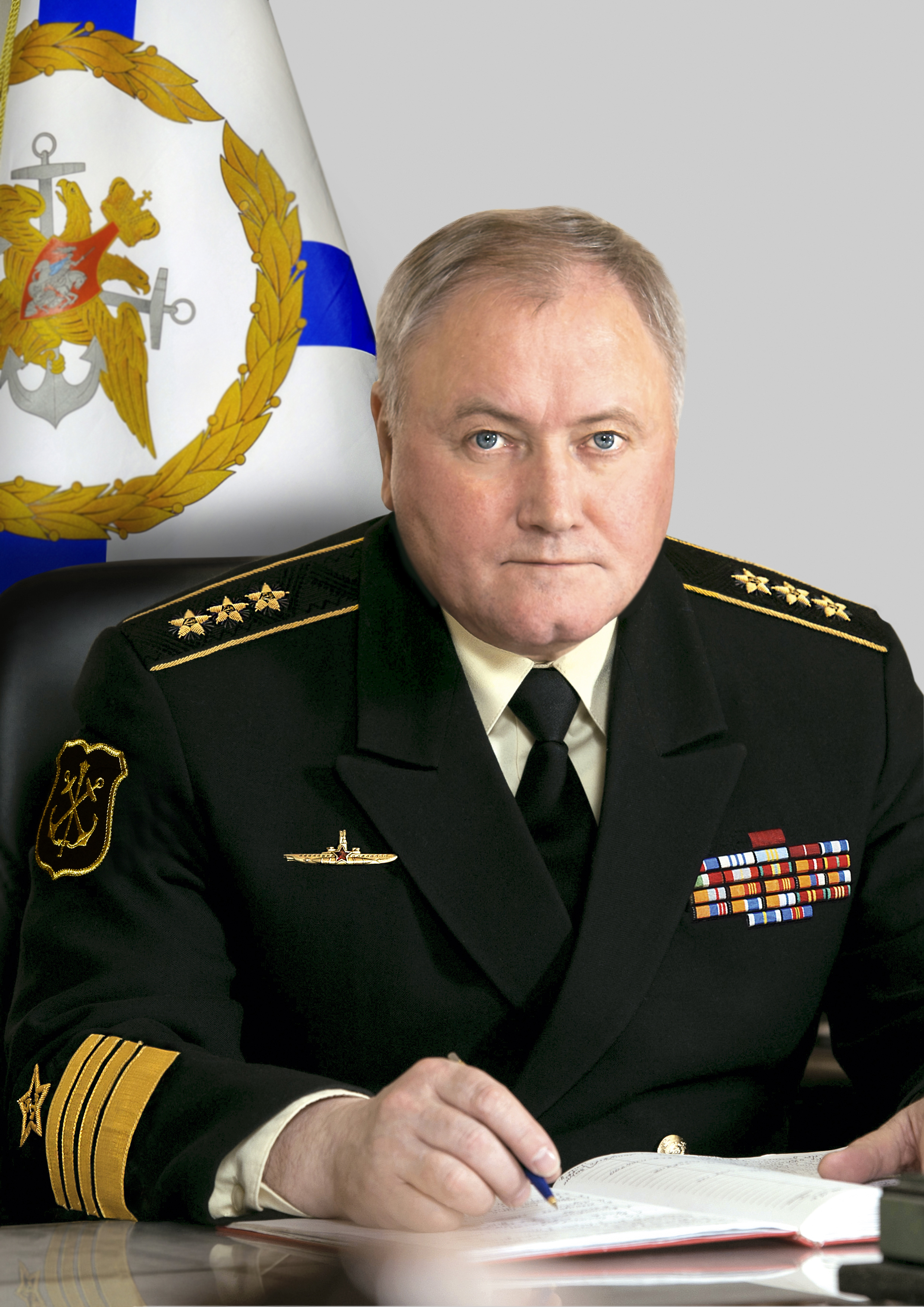
- Korolev in 2016
- Born: 1 February 1955 (age 71); Kashinsky District, Tver Oblast, Soviet Union
- Military career
- Allegiance: Soviet Union; Russia
- Branch: (Russia) Russian Navy
- Service years: 1972—2019
- Rank: Admiral
- Commands: Black Sea Fleet; Northern Fleet; Russian Navy
- Awards: Order "For Merit to the Fatherland", Order of Military Merit (Russia), Order of Naval Merit (Russia). Order for Service to the Homeland in the Armed Forces of the USSR

Vladimir Ivanovich Korolyov (Russian: Влади́мир Ива́нович Королёв; born 1 February 1955) is a retired Russian admiral who was Commander-in-Chief of the Russian Navy from 2015 to 2019. Before that, he was commander of the Northern Fleet from 2011 to 2015 and commander of the Northern Fleet Joint Strategic Command from 2014 to 2015.

== Biography ==
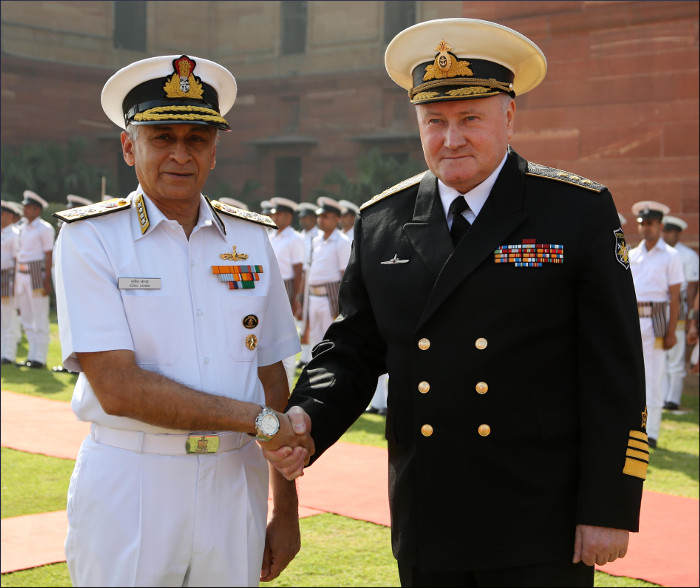
Admiral Korolyov with Indian Navy Chief, Admiral Sunil Lanba in 2017

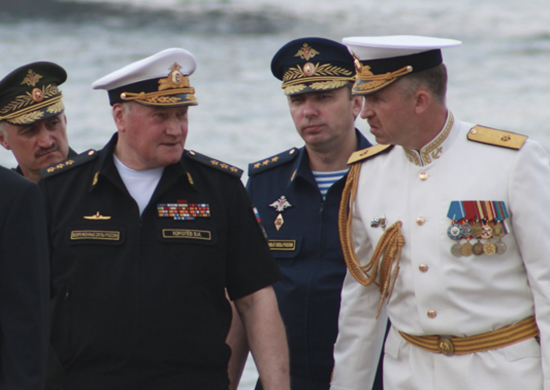
Korolyov in 2018

Korolyov graduated from the Frunze Higher Naval School in 1977. He attended the senior special officer program at the N. G. Kuznetsov Naval Academy in 1987. Korolyov served in submarines initially as navigating officer on the K467 (1977–81) and then as deputy commander of K495 (1981–84), commander of K-488 submarine (1987–88), commander of K-387 submarine (1988–93) and deputy commander of the 24th submarine division (December 1993 – April 1996). He worked at the anti-submarine division of the Northern Fleet (1996–2000) and was base commander at Gadzhievo naval base in 2002. He was subsequently chief of staff (September 2002 – August 2005) and then commanded the submarines of the 12th squadron of the Northern fleet (August 2005 – November 2007).

In 2007, Korolyov was appointed deputy commander of the Northern Fleet and in 2008, he commanded a squadron of ships including the battlecruiser Pyotr Velikiy and the Udaloy-class destroyer Admiral Chabanenko which participated in exercises in the Caribbean Sea visiting Cuba, Venezuela and Panama. Korolyov was appointed chief of staff and deputy commander of the Northern Fleet in 2009. In 2010 he became commander of the Black Sea Fleet and in 2011 he was appointed commander of the Northern Fleet.

In 2014, Korolyov was appointed commander of the Northern Fleet Joint Strategic Command to defend Russian arctic interests. Korolyov was appointed as acting commander of the Russian Navy when his predecessor, Viktor Chirkov had to take sick leave. Korolyov became commander of the Russian Navy in April 2016.

Korolyov retired from his post on 3 May 2019 and was replaced as Commander in Chief of the Navy by Nikolai Yevmenov.

== Awards ==
- Order "For Merit to the Fatherland" - 2009
- Order of Military Merit (Russia) - 1996
- Order of Naval Merit (Russia) - 2014
- Order "For Service to the Homeland in the Armed Forces of the USSR" - 3rd class - 1989

Military offices
Preceded by Sergey Simonenko	Chief of Staff of the Northern Fleet; 2009–2010	Succeeded by Andrei Volozhinsky
Preceded by Andrei Volozhinsky; Acting	Commander of the Northern Fleet; 2011–2015	Succeeded by Nikolai Yevmenov
Command established	Commander of Northern Fleet Joint Strategic Command; 2014–2015	Succeeded by Nikolai Yevmenov
Preceded by Viktor Chirkov	Commander-in-Chief of the Russian Navy; 2015–2019; Acting: 2015–2016	Succeeded by Nikolai Yevmenov
