= Yuri Sysuyev =

Russian naval officer

Yuri Nikolayevich Sysuyev
- Born: 6 February 1949 (age 77); Vozdvizhenka, Ussurisky District, Primorsky Krai, Soviet Union
- Allegiance: Soviet Union; Russia
- Branch: Soviet Navy; Russian Navy
- Service years: 1966-2009
- Rank: Admiral
- Commands: 5th Operational Squadron; Kerch-Feodosia Naval Base; Higher Special Officer Classes of the Navy; Kuznetsov Naval Academy
- Awards: Order of Military Merit; Order of Naval Merit; Order of the Red Star

Yuri Nikolayevich Sysuyev (Russian: Юрий Николаевич Сысуев; born 6 February 1949) is a retired officer of the Russian Navy. He holds the rank of admiral, and served as commander of the 5th Operational Squadron between 1992 and 1993, the Kerch-Feodosia Naval Base from 1993 to 1994, the Higher Special Officer Classes of the Navy from 1999 to 2003, and the Kuznetsov Naval Academy from 2003 to 2008.

== Biography ==
Sysuyev was born on 6 February 1949 in the village of Vozdvizhenka, Ussurisky District, Primorsky Krai, in what was then the Russian Soviet Federative Socialist Republic, in the Soviet Union. He entered the Soviet Navy, studying at the Kirov Caspian Higher Naval School in Baku from 1966 to 1971. On graduating, he was assigned to the Pacific Fleet and served as commander of the navigation department aboard a submarine from 1971 to 1975. He took the Higher Special Officer Classes of the Navy from 1975 to 1976, and on returning to the fleet, was executive officer of the Whiskey-class submarine S-365 from 1976 to 1977. From 1977 until 1980, he commanded S-365's sister ship S-224.

Sysuyev undertook further studies at the Grechko Naval Academy between 1980 and 1982, returning once more to the fleet. He took command of the 305th submarine crew until 1985, with time spent as commander of the Charlie-class submarine K-325, and then serving as deputy commander of the 28th Submarine Division until 1989. He was then commander of the 38th Submarine Division, operating out of Cam Ranh Base in Vietnam, until 1991, when he became deputy commander of the 5th Operational Squadron in the Mediterranean. He served in this role until December 1992, during the transition from the Soviet Navy to the Russian Navy, and from December 1992 was the 5th Operational Squadron's last commander, before its disbandment in December 1993. Sysuyev was then appointed commander of the Kerch-Feodosia Naval Base, and concurrently head of the 31st Scientific Research Centre of the Navy, stepping down as the naval base's commander in December 1994 to take the courses at the Military Academy of the General Staff from 1995 to 1996. He remained head of the research centre until 1999, when he was appointed to command the Higher Special Officer Classes of the Navy. He did so until May 2003, when, remaining in academia, he became head of the Kuznetsov Naval Academy. He held this post until his retirement in 2009, having been promoted to admiral in 2004.

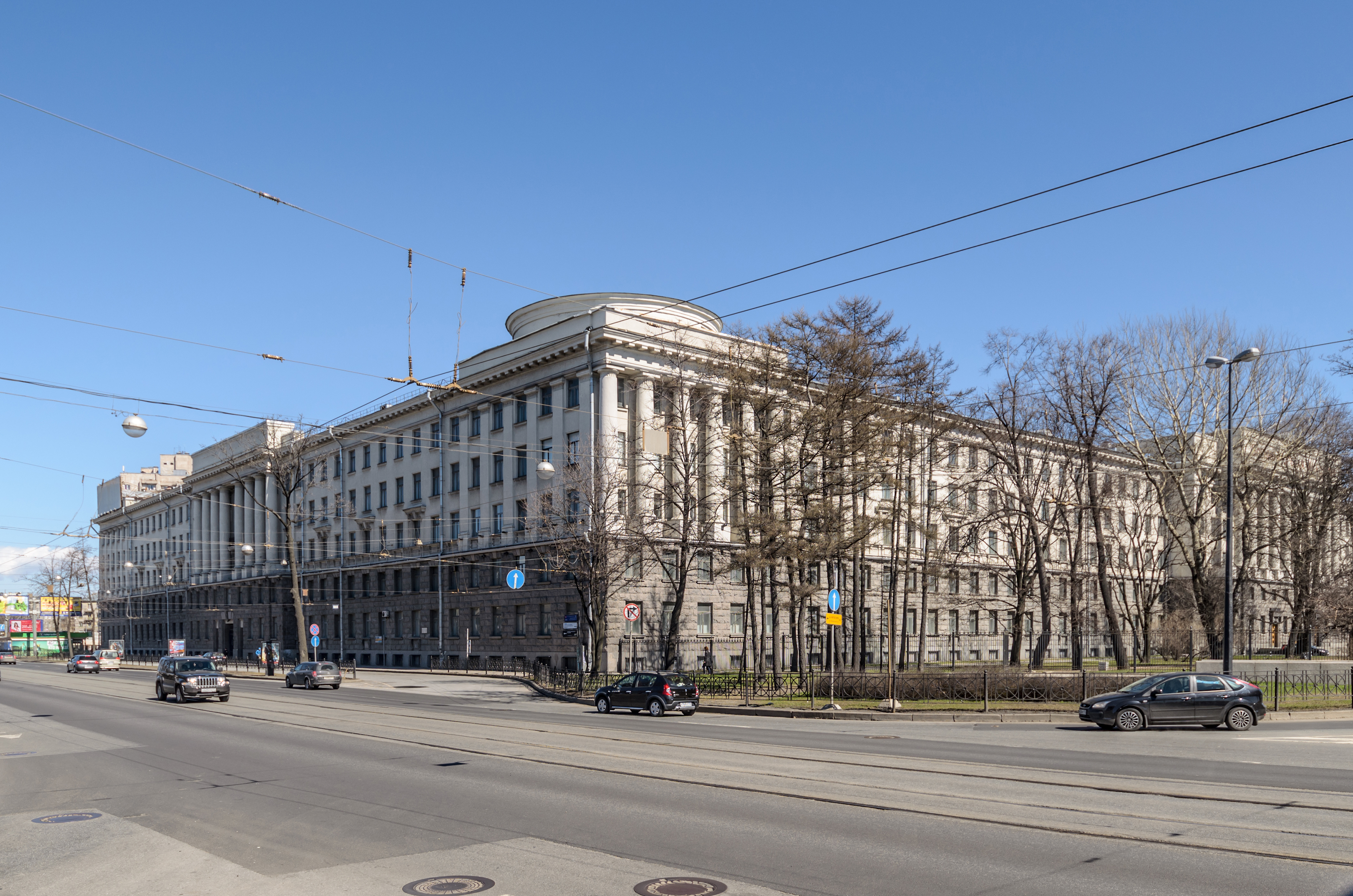
The Kuznetsov Naval Academy. Sysuyev was head of the academy between 2003 and 2008.

In retirement, Sysuyev was appointed senior research fellow of the Naval Academy's 11th department of the Scientific Research Center of the Specialized Research Institute of Operational and Strategic Research. He was also one of the retired officers who established the Regional Public Organization of Admirals and Generals of the Navy "Admirals Club", and was its first chairman. Sysuyev is a candidate of military sciences, and an associate professor. In February 2024, a special tribute and concert was held for Sysuyev's 75th birthday at the Naval Academy. A congratulatory letter from Commander-in-Chief of the Russian Navy Admiral Nikolai Yevmenov was read out, stating "An active civic position, statesmanlike thinking, determination, organizational talent, innovative approaches combined with a deep understanding of the military command system have created for you genuine authority and respect among your fellow servicemen, sailors and comrades in arms."

== Honours and awards ==
Over his career Sysuyev has received the Order of Military Merit, the Order of Naval Merit, the Order of the Red Star, and various other medals.
