= Viktor Chirkov =

Russian Navy admiral

- Виктор Викторович Чирков
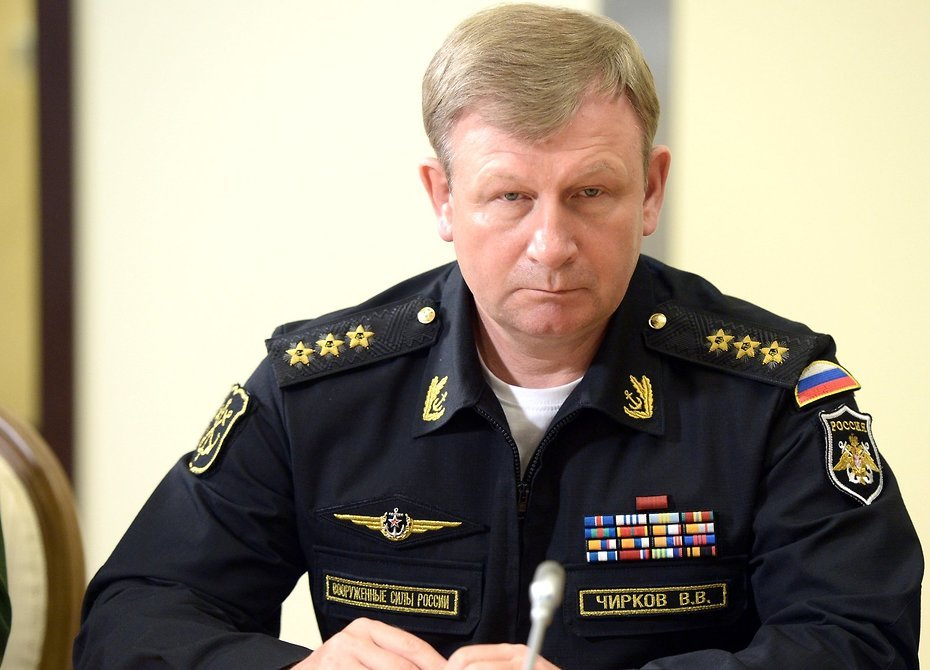
- Born: 8 September 1959 (age 67); Alma-Ata, Kazakh SSR, Soviet Union (now Almaty, Kazakhstan)
- Military career
- Allegiance: Soviet Union; Russia
- Branch: (Russia) Russian Navy
- Service years: 1977–2016
- Rank: Admiral
- Commands: Baltic Fleet; Russian Navy

Viktor Viktorovich Chirkov (Russian: Виктор Викторович Чирков; born 8 September 1959) is a Russian admiral and the former commander of the Baltic Fleet. On 6 May 2012, he was appointed Commander-in-Chief of the Russian Navy, succeeding Vladimir Vysotsky, who had occupied the post for almost five years. He retired from his position for health reasons in March 2016.

== Military career ==
Chirkov is a surface warfare officer with Pacific Fleet roots. He was born on 8 September 1959 in Alma-Ata, capital of the former Kazakh SSR. In 1982, he graduated from the Pacific Higher Naval School in Vladivostok and became head of the mine-torpedo department on the Riga-class frigate Lun in the Pacific Fleet. He served as assistant commander of a corvette, then executive officer of the Kotlin-class destroyer Vozbuzhdennyy.

In 1986-1987, Chirkov completed Higher Special Officers’ Classes in Leningrad, and became commander of the infamous Krivak-class frigate Storozhevoy. Under a mutinous crew, this Soviet Baltic Fleet unit had tried, unsuccessfully, to defect in 1975. Later it transferred to the Pacific Fleet.

From 1990 to 1993, Chirkov commanded the Udaloy-class destroyer Admiral Spiridonov. He was deputy chief of staff for an ASW ship division, deputy division commander, and commander of an ASW ship division during 1993-1998. In 1997, he completed the Kuznetsov Naval Academy as a correspondence student.

After graduating from the Military Academy of the General Staff in 2000, Chirkov served for five years as chief of staff, first deputy commander of Troops and Forces in the North-East on Kamchatka. In the first years of this assignment, he served under Vice-Admiral Konstantin Sidenko.

In 2005-2007, he commanded the Primorskiy Mixed Forces Flotilla. For the next two years, he was chief of staff, first deputy commander of the Baltic Fleet, and became its commander in September 2009.

Since 2007, he was the Chief of Staff/First Deputy Commander of the Baltic Fleet, and appointed Fleet Commander by the President of Russia Dmitry Medvedev on 8 September 2009.

On 6 May 2012, President Dmitry Medvedev on his last day in office prior to the inauguration of Vladimir Putin appointed Chirkov to replace Vladimir Vysotsky as the Russian Navy's Commander-in-Chief. In an interview with news agency RIA Novosti, Chirkov said:

"The most important thing for Russia is to build a fleet with the support of the president and like-minded persons."

In March 2014, as Commander-in-Chief of the Russian Navy, Chirkov also oversaw all naval operations with Aleksandr Vitko who was then commander of the Russian Black Sea Fleet during Russia's annexation of the Crimean Peninsula in which both the Sevastopol Naval Base and Southern Naval Base were seized by Russian forces.

=== Retirement ===
In March 2016, Russian media announced Chirkov's retirement for health reasons. Vladimir Korolev, then commander of the Northern Fleet, was named as his successor.

== Awards ==
- Order of Military Merit
- Order of Naval Merit
- Order for Service to the Homeland in the Armed Forces of the USSR III- class

Military offices
Preceded by Vladimir Vysotsky	Commander-in-chief of the Russian Navy; 2012–2016	Succeeded by Vladimir Korolev
