= Nikolai Maksimov =

Russian naval officer

Nikolai Mikhailovich Maksimov
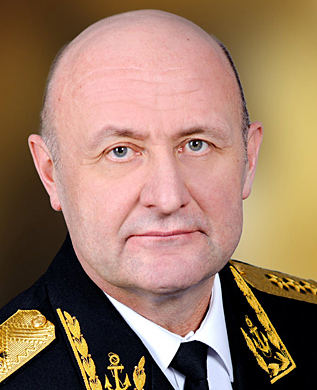
- Born: 15 May 1956 (age 69); Bolgrad, Odesa Oblast, Ukrainian SSR, USSR
- Allegiance: Soviet Union; Russia
- Branch: Soviet Navy; Russian Navy
- Service years: 1973–2012
- Rank: Admiral
- Commands: Northern Fleet; N. G. Kuznetsov Naval Academy; Navy Shipbuilding and Weapons Research Institute
- Awards: Order of Military Merit; Order of Naval Merit; Order "For Service to the Homeland in the Armed Forces of the USSR" Third Class; Order "For Merit to the Fatherland" Fourth Class

Nikolai Mikhailovich Maksimov (Russian: Николай Михайлович Максимов; Ukrainian: Микола Михайлович Максимов, romanized: Mykola Mykhailovych Maksymov; born 15 May 1956) is a retired officer of the Russian Navy. He currently holds the rank of admiral in the reserve, and has most recently been head of the Navy Shipbuilding and Weapons Research Institute.

Maksimov was born in the Ukrainian SSR in 1956, and began his naval education with studies at the Leningrad Nakhimov Naval School and the Higher Naval School of Submarine Navigation. His career has been spent mostly with the Northern Fleet, where he served as an officer aboard submarines, rising through the ranks to command nuclear-powered ballistic missile submarines. This was followed by staff appointments with the fleet's various submarine divisions, eventually becoming deputy commander of the Northern Fleet in 2005 and then its commander in 2007. During his time in command he oversaw various naval exercises, including those in 2008, which were the largest the Russian navy had held in the Atlantic since 1991. He also continued his studies with attendance at the Higher Special Officer Classes of the Navy, the N. G. Kuznetsov Naval Academy, and the Military Academy of the General Staff of the Armed Forces of Russia.

Maksimov became chief of staff and first deputy commander of the troops of the Western Military District in 2011, before retiring from active military service in 2012. As an admiral in the reserve, he continued to play an important role in naval affairs, serving as head of the Naval Academy until 2016, and then as head of the Navy Shipbuilding and Weapons Research Institute.

== Early service and education ==
Maksimov was born on 15 May 1956 in Bolgrad, Odesa Oblast, Ukrainian SSR, in the Soviet Union. He studied at the Nakhimov Naval School in Leningrad from 1971 until 1973, and then the Higher Naval School of Submarine Navigation from 1973, graduating in 1978. He took the Higher Special Officer Classes of the Navy, between 1985 and 1986, and after entering the N. G. Kuznetsov Naval Academy in 1993, graduated with honours in 1995. In 2000 he graduated with a gold medal after two years of study at the Military Academy of the General Staff of the Armed Forces of Russia.

Maksimov's career has been spent mainly with the Northern Fleet, where he went from the commander of a departmental group aboard a submarine, to weapons commander, assistant commander between 1978 and 1985, and then senior assistant to the submarine commander between 1986 and 1992. He later served as commander of the Project 667A Navaga nuclear ballistic missile submarine K-137 Leninets between 1992 and 1993, followed by the Project 667BDRM Delfin nuclear ballistic missile submarine K-18 in 1993. He was promoted to deputy commander of the 31st Submarine Division from 1995 until 1996, and then served as the division's commander until 1998.

== Staff appointments and fleet command ==
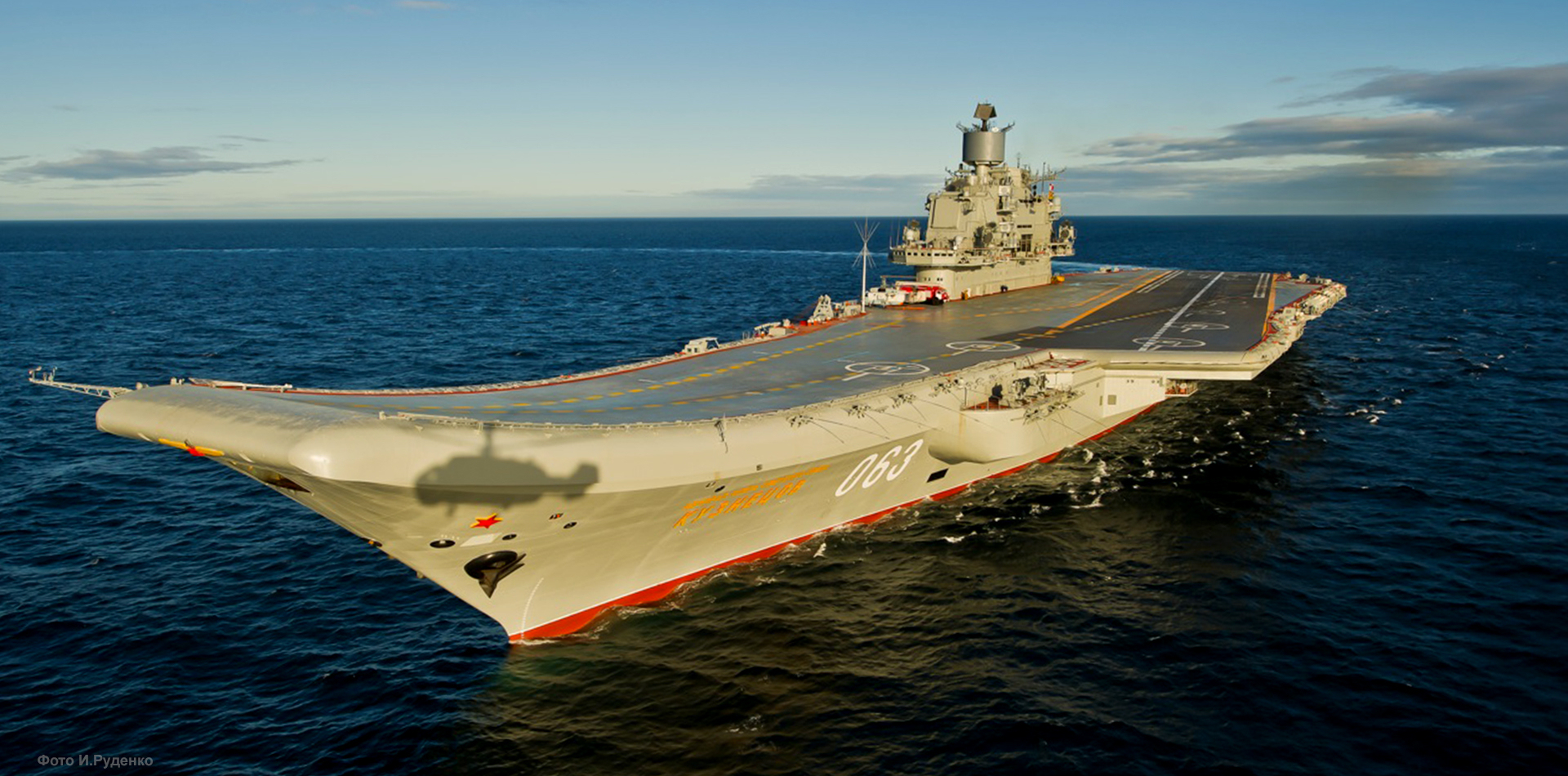
The aircraft carrier Admiral Kuznetsov, part of the Atlantic exercises conducted under Maksimov's auspices in 2008

From 2000 to 2001 Maksimov was deputy commander of the 7th Operational Squadron, and from 2001 to 2002 he was Chief of Staff of the 3rd Submarine Flotilla. In 2002 he became commander of the 12th submarine squadron, holding the post until 2005, when he was appointed deputy commander of the Northern Fleet. With the appointment of the fleet's commander, Vladimir Vysotskiy, as Commander-in-Chief of the Navy, Vice-Admiral Maksimov became acting-commander of the Northern Fleet, and was confirmed in the post by presidential decree on 19 November 2007. As Northern Fleet commander, Maksimov was in charge of joint naval-air exercises with elements of the Northern and Black Sea Fleets in the Atlantic Ocean in January 2008. The exercises, the largest Russian military manoeuvres in the Atlantic since 1991, involved 11 vessels, including the aircraft carrier Admiral Kuznetsov and the guided missile cruiser Moskva, and 47 aircraft. The live-fire exercises off the French and Spanish coasts included the Moskva striking a target ship with a P-500 Bazalt cruise missile at a range of 560 km (300 nmi). Maksimov announced the intent of the exercises was to restore "Russia's naval presence in key operational areas of the world's oceans." The following year he oversaw the Northern Fleet's "Dvina" exercises, attended by Navy commander Vladimir Vysotskiy, President Dmitry Medvedev and Defence Minister Anatoliy Serdyukov.

Maksimov was appointed chief of staff and first deputy commander of the troops of the Western Military District on 30 March 2011, holding the post until his retirement from service on 29 October 2012. On 7 November 2012 he was appointed head of the N. G. Kuznetsov Naval Academy. He held this post until 17 May 2016, having been elected chairman of the International Association of Public Organizations of Navy Veterans and Submariners in December 2013. From May 2016 he served as head of the Navy Shipbuilding and Weapons Research Institute.

== Family and awards ==
Over his career Maksimov has been awarded the Order "For Service to the Homeland in the Armed Forces of the USSR" Third Class, the Order of Military Merit, the Order of Naval Merit, the Order "For Merit to the Fatherland" Fourth Class, and various medals. He is a Candidate of Military Sciences (к. воен. н. (PhD)). Maksimov is married, with two sons.
