= Irina Kostrova =

Russian actress (1923–2025)

- Ирина Кострова
- Born: 4 April 1923; Moscow, Russian SFSR, USSR
- Died: 1 May 2025 (aged 102); Moscow, Russia
- Occupation: Actress
- Years active: 1949–2025
- Spouse: Anatoly Sventsitsky (m. 1949; died 2007)
- Awards: Merited Artist of the Russian Federation; Order "For Merit in Culture and Art"

Irina Vasilyevna Kostrova (Russian: Ирина Васильевна Кострова; 4 April 1923 – 1 May 2025) was a Soviet and Russian actress, celebrated for her extensive contributions to theatre over a career spanning more than seven decades. She was honored with the title of Honored Artist of the Russian Federation in 1999 and continued to perform into her centenarian years.

== Early life ==
Kostrova was born on 4 April 1923 in Moscow, then part of the Russian Soviet Federative Socialist Republic. She hailed from a noble family; her father was a former officer who had been awarded two St. George Crosses and the Order of St. Alexander Nevsky. In 1941, she completed her secondary education. During World War II, she participated in agitational brigades, performing to boost the morale of Soviet troops and citizens.

== Career ==
Kostrova began her theatrical career at the Railway Theater under the direction of Maria Knebel. She later joined prominent Moscow theatres, including Lenkom Theatre and the Taganka Theatre. Throughout her career, she performed in notable productions such as Thunderstorm, Stepmother, Treachery and Love, An Optimistic Tragedy, and Noble Nest. Her performances were acclaimed for their depth and emotional resonance, earning her a prominent place in Soviet and Russian cultural history.

In recognition of her artistic achievements, Kostrova was awarded the title of Merited Artist of the Russian Federation in 1999. She also received honorary titles from the Republics of Kabardino-Balkaria and Kalmykia. In 2023, at the age of 100, she was awarded the Order "For Merit in Culture and Art" for her significant contributions to Russian culture and the arts.

== Personal life and death ==
Kostrova was married to actor Anatoly Sventsitsky from 1949 until his death in 2007.

Kostrova died in Moscow on 1 May 2025, at the age of 102.
