= Chirkov =

Chirkov (Russian: Чирков, from чирок (chirok) meaning "teal") is a Don Cossack Russian masculine surname; its feminine counterpart is Chirkova. The exact origin of the family traces to the river Chir, a tributary of the Don river, and its age and its position are documented. Ennobled as princes, the Chirkov family is featured in Leo Tolstoy's Anna Karenina, where a member of Karenin's family is mentioned as having married Princess Chirkova. Following the revolution, the family was dispersed, but its members have held influential posts in post-Soviet and Russian society, including the current admiral of the Russian fleet.

The name may refer to

- Boris Chirkov (1901–1982), Soviet actor
- Svetlana Chirkova-Lozovaya (born 1945), Soviet fencer
- Viktor Chirkov (born 1959), Russian admiral
- Denista Chirkova (1909–1977), Bulgarian Folk Dancer, Burlesque Artist
