= Ponikarovsky =

Ponikarovsky (Russian: Поникаровский, Ukrainian: Понікаровський) is a surname. Among those with this name are:

- Alexei Ponikarovsky (b. 1980), Ukrainian–Canadian ice hockey player
- Valentin Ponikarovsky (1927—2009), Soviet and Russian naval officer
