= Nikolai Yevmenov =

Russian admiral (born 1962)

Admiral Nikolai Yevmenov
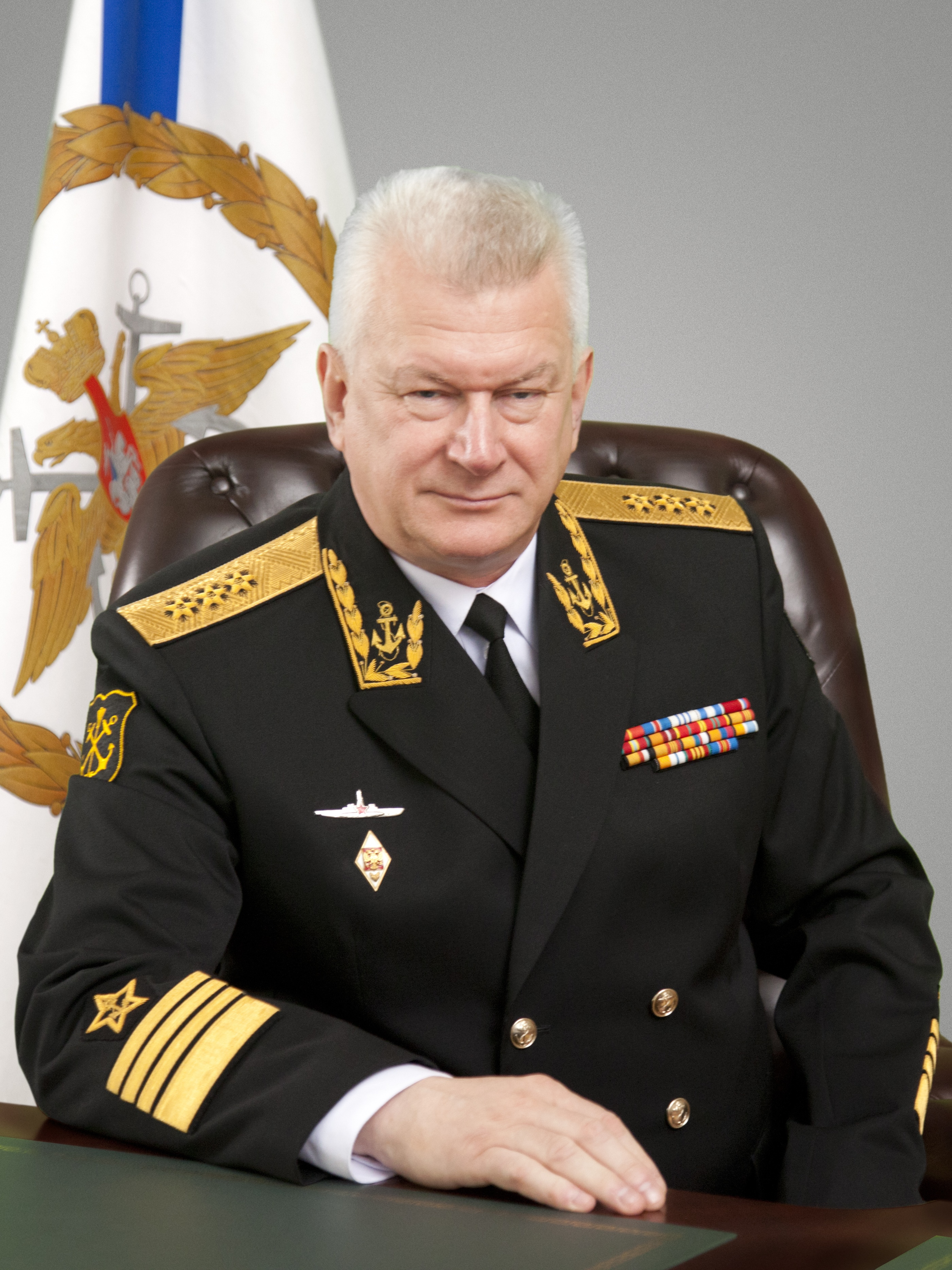
- Official portrait, 2022
- Born: 2 April 1962 (age 64); Moscow, Soviet Union
- Military career
- Allegiance: Soviet Union (to 1991); Russia
- Branch: Soviet Navy; Russian Navy
- Service years: 1980–present
- Rank: Admiral
- Commands: N. G. Kuznetsov Naval Academy; Commander-in-Chief of the Russian Navy; Northern Fleet
- Awards: Order "For Merit to the Fatherland", Order of Military Merit (Russia), Order of Naval Merit (Russia). Order for Service to the Homeland in the Armed Forces of the USSR

Nikolai Anatolyevich Yevmenov (Russian: Николай Анатольевич Евменов, born 2 April 1962) is a Russian admiral who served as the commander-in-chief of the Russian Navy from 2019 to 2024. He is currently the director of the N. G. Kuznetsov Naval Academy.

== Biography ==
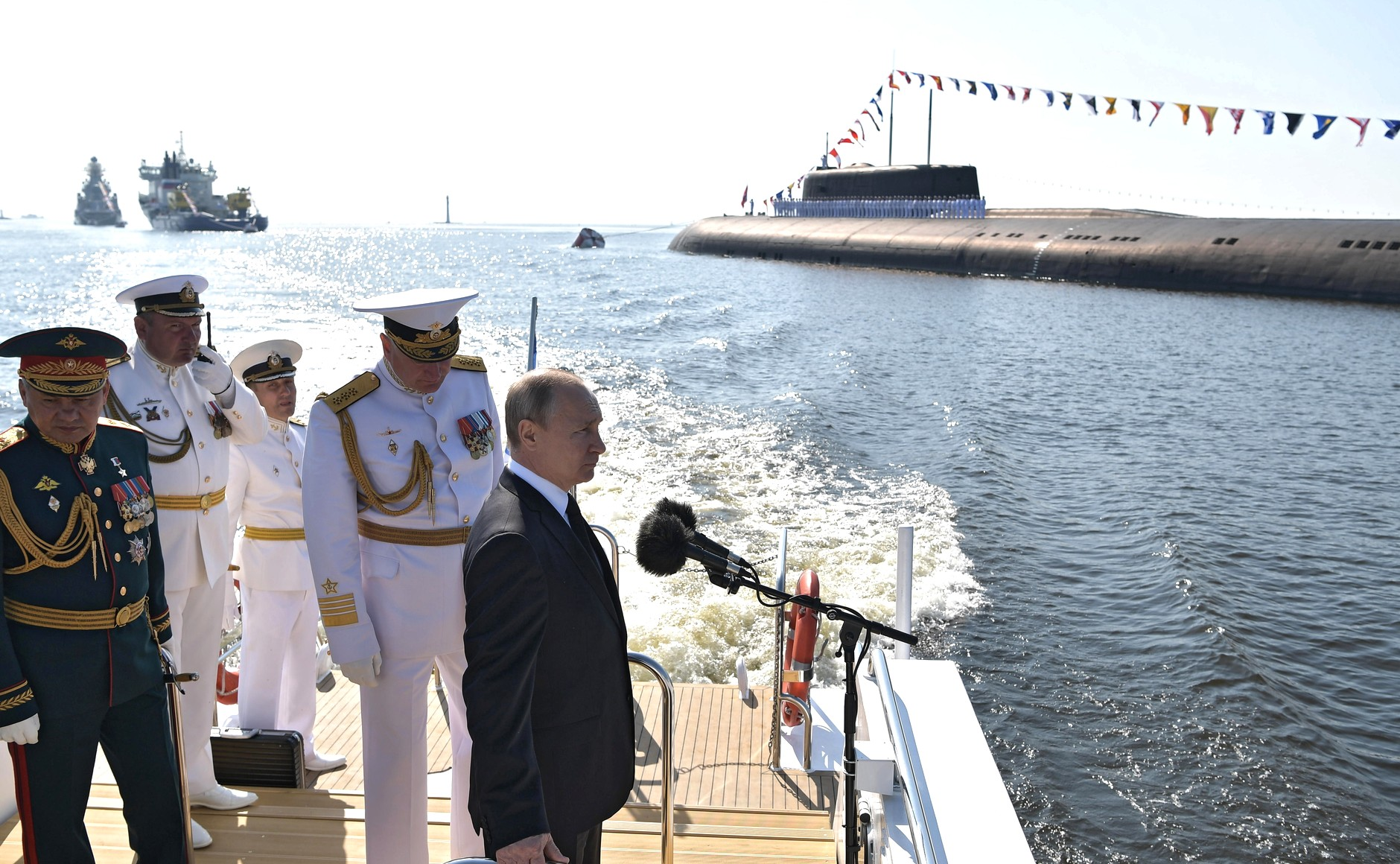
Yevmenov with Russian President Vladimir Putin and Defense Minister Sergei Shoigu, 27 July 2019

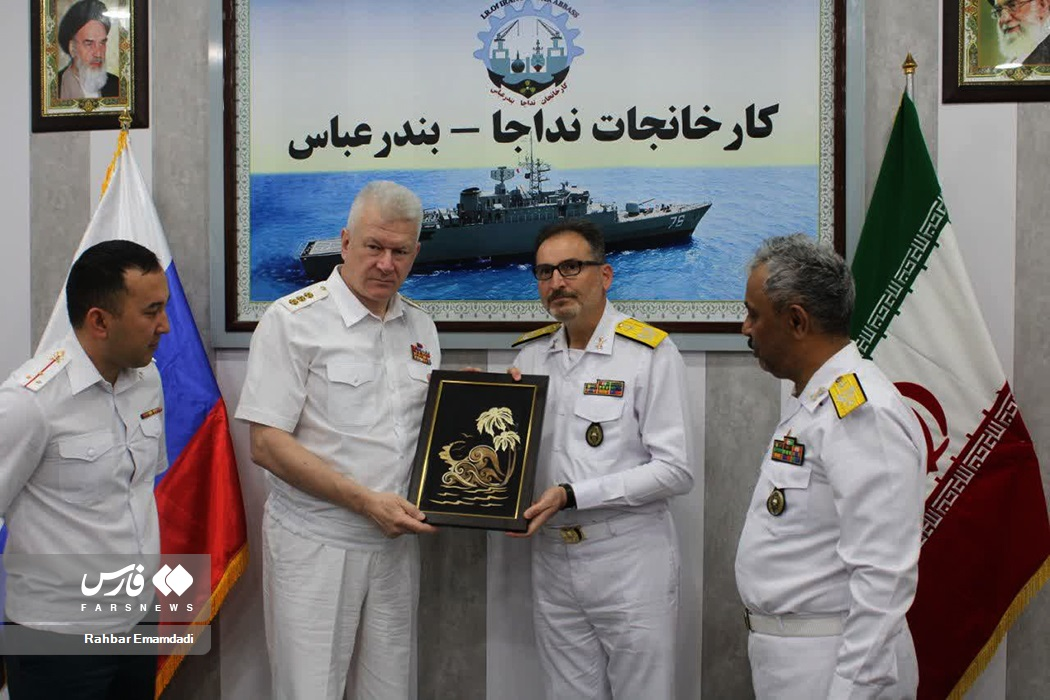
Yevmenov at the Islamic Republic of Iran Navy base in Iran, 18 May 2023

Yevmenov was born on 2 April 1962 in Moscow. He studied at the Higher Naval School of Submarine Navigation between 1980 and 1987, after which he was appointed commander of the electronic navigation department of the navigation unit (BCh-1) of a nuclear submarine in the Pacific Fleet from 1987 to 1991.

Between 1995 and 1997 he studied at the N. G. Kuznetsov Naval Academy. Between 1997 and 1999 he commanded ballistic missile submarines in the Pacific Fleet. Between 1999 and 2006 he was chief of staff, deputy commander and subsequently commander of the 25th submarine division of the Pacific Fleet, having studied at the Military Academy of the General Staff of the Armed Forces of Russia during 2001 to 2003. In 2012 Yevmenov became deputy commander of the Northern Fleet, becoming commander in 2016 and being promoted to Admiral in 2017.

Yevmenov was appointed commander-in-chief of the Russian Navy on 3 May 2019 succeeding Admiral Vladimir Korolyov. In November, Yevmenov visited Japan. During his meeting with Hiroshi Yamamura, the Chief of Staff of the Japanese Maritime Self Defence Force, a picture of the two men was taken against the background of a portrait of Togo Heihachiro, the Japanese Commander-in-Chief of the Combined Fleet who defeated Russian fleet during the Battle of Tsushima, Russo-Japanese War and a controversy ensued.

According to Izvestia he was replaced as commander-in-chief of the Russian Navy by Aleksandr Moiseyev; this was confirmed on 19 March 2024, by the Russian state news agency RIA Novosti.

He was appointed the director of the Kuznetsov Naval Academy.

=== Sanctions ===
In February 2022, Yevmenov was put on the European Union sanctions list for being "responsible for actively supporting and implementing actions and policies that undermine and threaten the territorial integrity, sovereignty and independence of Ukraine as well as the stability or security in Ukraine." He was also sanctioned by the UK government on 15 March 2022 in relation to the Russo-Ukrainian War.

== Awards ==
- Order of Alexander Nevsky (2016)
- Order of Military Merit (Russia) (2006)
- Order of Naval Merit (Russia) (2015)

== Citations ==
Military offices
Preceded by Andrei Volozhinsky	Chief of Staff of the Northern Fleet; 2012–2015	Succeeded by Aleksandr Moiseyev
Preceded by Vladimir Korolyov	Commander of the Northern Fleet; 2015–2019	Succeeded by Aleksandr Moiseyev
Preceded by Vladimir Korolyov	Commander of Northern Fleet Joint Strategic Command; 2015–2019	Succeeded by Aleksandr Moiseyev
Preceded by Vladimir Korolyov	Commander-in-Chief of the Russian Navy; 2019–2024	Succeeded by Aleksandr Moiseyev
Preceded by Aleksandr Karpov	Director of the N. G. Kuznetsov Naval Academy; 2024–present	Incumbent
