= Order of Pirogov =

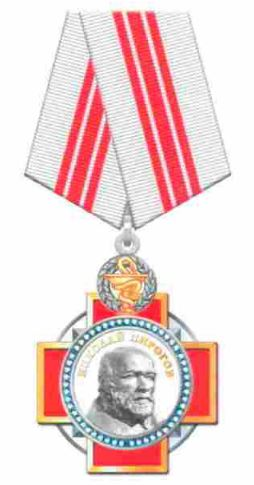
- Obverse of the Order of Pirogov
- Type: Honorary title
- Presented by: Russia (2020–present)
- Eligibility: Citizens of Russia
- Status: Being awarded
- Established: 19 June 2020
- First award: 21 June 2020
- Ribbon of the Order of Pirogov

Precedence
- Next (higher): Order of Naval Merit
- Next (lower): Order "For Merit in Culture and Art"
- Related: Honoured Doctor of the Russian Federation

The Order of Pirogov (Russian: Орден Пирогова) is a state award of the Russian Federation. Established by Decree of the President of the Russian Federation of June 19, 2020 No. 404 “On the establishment of the Order of Pirogov and the Medal of Luke of Crimea”. The award is named after the Russian surgeon, scientist and teacher Nikolay Pirogov (1810–1881), considered the founder of military field surgery, as well as surgery as a scientific discipline. The order is awarded to citizens of Russia for dedication in providing medical care in emergency situations, epidemics, military operations and other circumstances involving a risk to life, merits in the field of practical medical activities and highly effective organization of work on the diagnosis, prevention and treatment of especially dangerous diseases, contributions in strengthening public health, preventing the occurrence and development of infectious and non-infectious diseases, as well as in other cases specified in the statute. In cases determined by the statute of the order, awards can be awarded to foreign citizens for providing medical care in complex clinical cases, treating especially dangerous diseases, active participation in the scientific activities of Russian medical organizations and other merits. The motto of the Order of Pirogov is “Mercy, duty, dedication”.

== History ==
Until 2020, in Russia, as well as in the Soviet Union, there were neither specialized orders intended for awarding for medical merits, nor orders bearing the name of Pirogov: in the Soviet period, medical workers were awarded the honorary titles “Honored Doctor of the RSFSR” and "People's Doctor of the USSR", similar titles of "Honoured Doctor of the Russian Federation" and "Honoured Health Worker of the Russian Federation" were introduced in the Russian Federation. As a public award, the Order of Pirogov was established on April 17, 2004, by the European Academy of Natural Sciences; The RIA Novosti news agency called this order “one of the most honorable awards in the medical community”. The proposal to establish the Order of Pirogov was first put forward during the Great Patriotic War and was discussed at the highest level in the post-war period. Sketches of projects for the Order of Pirogov authored by various Soviet artists and architects have been preserved, but not a single project was ever realized. In 2014, the Russian Society of Medical Historians took the initiative to establish the Pirogov Medal as a departmental award of the Ministry of Health of the Russian Federation. The authors of the initiative believed that such an award could be awarded to doctors, scientists, teachers and representatives of nursing staff “for outstanding achievements in professional, scientific, pedagogical and medical activities”.

Against the backdrop of the spread of COVID-19 in Russia, a decision was made to establish new state awards intended to reward medical workers who have distinguished themselves during the epidemic; V.V. Putin stated that “unprecedented achievements in the name of one’s people, the Motherland, certainly deserve special encouragement from the state”. Decree of the President of the Russian Federation dated June 19, 2020 No. 404 approved the statute and description of the Order of Pirogov. As noted by the RBC publication, the Order of Pirogov became the first order established in Russia since 2012: on May 3, 2012, Russian President D. A. Medvedev established the Order of the Holy Great Martyr Catherine. Simultaneously with the Order of Pirogov, the Luka Crimean Medal was established by the same presidential decree.

== Criteria ==
According to the statute of the award, approved by Decree of the President of the Russian Federation of June 19, 2020 No. 404 “On the establishment of the Order of Pirogov and the Crimean Luke Medal” (as amended by Decree of November 19, 2021 No. 665), the Order of Pirogov is awarded to citizens of the Russian Federation in the following cases:

- For dedication in providing medical care in emergency situations, epidemics, military operations and in other circumstances involving a risk to life;
- For merits in the field of practical medical activities and highly effective organization of work on the diagnosis, prevention and treatment of especially dangerous diseases;
- For contribution to strengthening public health, preventing the occurrence and development of infectious and non-infectious diseases;
- For services in the field of medical sciences, development and implementation of innovative methods of prevention, diagnosis and treatment of diseases, medical rehabilitation;
- For services related to the development of drugs, conducting their preclinical studies, conducting clinical studies of new drugs;
- For services in training qualified personnel for Russian medical organizations;
- For services related to the organization of emergency medical care, the provision of relevant high-quality services, as well as the provision of highly qualified inpatient care for patients;
- For services in providing medical care in emergency situations, epidemics, military operations and in other circumstances involving a risk to life;
- For services related to the provision of high-quality social services to citizens, the provision of qualified inpatient care and home care for citizens in need of social services;
- For services in organizing the provision and provision of social support measures to needy citizens;
- For personal merits in carrying out charitable and other socially useful activities to support hospices, hospitals, clinics and other medical organizations;
- For merits in the development of voluntary activities (volunteering), preserving and enhancing the traditions of mercy, for free and selfless assistance to people, the implementation of socially significant projects and programs, and the popularization of a healthy lifestyle.

The statute of the order also establishes that this award can be awarded to foreign citizens “for the provision of medical care in complex clinical cases, treatment of especially dangerous diseases, active participation in the scientific activities of Russian medical organizations and other merits”.

The awarding of the Order of Pirogov to a citizen of Russia is, as a rule, provided that the citizen nominated for the order has another state award of the Russian Federation. The statute also allows for the award of the order posthumously.

The badge of the order is worn on the left side of the chest and, in the presence of other orders of the Russian Federation, is located after the badge of the Order “For Naval Merit”. For special occasions and possible everyday wear, it is envisaged to wear a miniature copy of the order's badge, which is located after the miniature copy of the badge of the Order “For Naval Merit”. When wearing a ribbon of the order on uniform, it is located on the bar after the ribbon of the Order “For Naval Merit”. On civilian clothes, a ribbon of the Order of Pirogov is worn in the form of a rosette, which is located on the left side of the chest.
