= 5th Operational Squadron =

Fifth Eskadra пятая эскадра
- Active: 1963–1992
- Country: Soviet Union
- Branch: Soviet Navy
- Role: Naval warfare Amphibious warfare
- Engagements: Cold War

The 5th Squadron (Russian: пятая эскадра, translit. pyataya eskadra, was a squadron of the Soviet Navy.

The squadron was first established in 1963–64 during the Cold War. The North Atlantic Treaty Organization (NATO) generally referred to it as the Soviet Mediterranean Fleet (Russian: Средиземноморский флот), as it was the primary adversary to the U.S. Navy's Sixth Fleet and British Mediterranean Fleet. Attached to the Russian Navy after the dissolution of the Soviet Union, the 5th Squadron was deactivated amid the downsizing of the Russian Armed Forces on 31 December 1992.

Since 2013, the Russian Ministry of Defence has operated the permanent Mediterranean Sea Task Force of the Russian Navy.

== History ==
The Soviet Navy in the first half of the 1960s had not yet been able to create a force that could effectively cripple the Sixth Fleet. The Black Sea Fleet force deployed in the Mediterranean, did not have the required strength, and the attention of the Soviet Navy's leaders was drawn to the potential of first diesel electric, and then nuclear submarines to stealthily track and, with nuclear weapons, subsequently destroy aircraft carriers.

Up to May 1965, the Soviet Navy attempted to carry out its task in the Mediterranean Sea by creating a so-called mixed subdivisions formed from ships of the Northern Fleet and the Baltic Fleet under the command of Captain 1st Rank E.I. Volobuyev and O.P. Grumbkov. This force included submarines, destroyers and supply vessels. In May 1965, the first mixed squadron was formed from the hydrographic, support vessels, attack cruisers and submarines of the Black Sea Fleet in the Mediterranean Sea, under the command of 20th Water Region Division Captain 1st Rank Igor N. Molodtsov.

The question of creating staff and a temporary operational squadron in the Mediterranean was raised repeatedly by Admiral Sergei Gorshkov, Chief of the Navy. However, the General Staff did not approve the idea. Contrary to custom, Gorshkov continued to harass the Ministry of Defence with persistent requests for the creation of "... the organization that can hardly be found", not bothered by the fact that it caused irritation to the Chief of the General Staff. The Commander used to do that every suitable occasion, but "up to a certain time the requests of the Commander for the establishment of regular Mediterranean squadron to officers of the General Staff met with failure, or silence."

The Six-Day War of 1967 was a factor in accelerating the creation of the Mediterranean squadron. In June 1967, the Politburo decided to create a Mediterranean squadron. In accordance with this decision, the establishment of the squadron was ordered by the Order of the Navy Commander No. 0195, dated 14 June 1967. Rear Admiral Boris Petrov took command, and took over command of all the forces that were present on 14 July 1967 in the Mediterranean.

During the 1973 Yom Kipur War, the Squadron played an active role in the provision of support to both Syria and Egypt in that war. The Soviet Navy deployed more than 50 surface warships and submarines in the Mediterranean during the crisis and threats by the USSR to intervene in the conflict led the United States to raise the alert status of its nuclear forces to DEFCON 3. Naval activities by the Squadron in the Mediterranean included intensive anti-carrier exercises thus raising the potential danger for the US 6th Fleet. Nevertheless conflict was averted when the Soviet leadership lifted its intervention threat following the raising of the US nuclear alert level.

Attached to the Russian Navy after the dissolution of the Soviet Union, the 5th Squadron was deactivated amid the downsizing of the Russian Armed Forces on 31 December 1992.

== Commanders ==
- Rear Admiral Boris Petrov (14 July 1967 – 1969)
- Rear Admiral Vladimir Leonenkov (1969–1971)
- Rear Admiral Evgeniy Volobuev (1971–1974)
- Rear Admiral Vladimir Akimov (1974–1977)
- Rear Admiral Nikolai Ryabinskiy (1977–1981)
- Rear Admiral Valentin Selivanov (1981–1985)
- Rear Admiral Vladimir Kalabin (1985–1986)
- Rear Admiral Vladimir Yegorov (1986–1988)
- Rear Admiral Alexandr Gorbunov (1988–1990)
- Rear Admiral Pyotr Svyatashov (1992–1992)
- Rear Admiral Yuri Sysuyev (1992–1993)
