= Valentin Ponikarovsky =

Russian naval officer

Valentin Nikolayevich Ponikarovsky
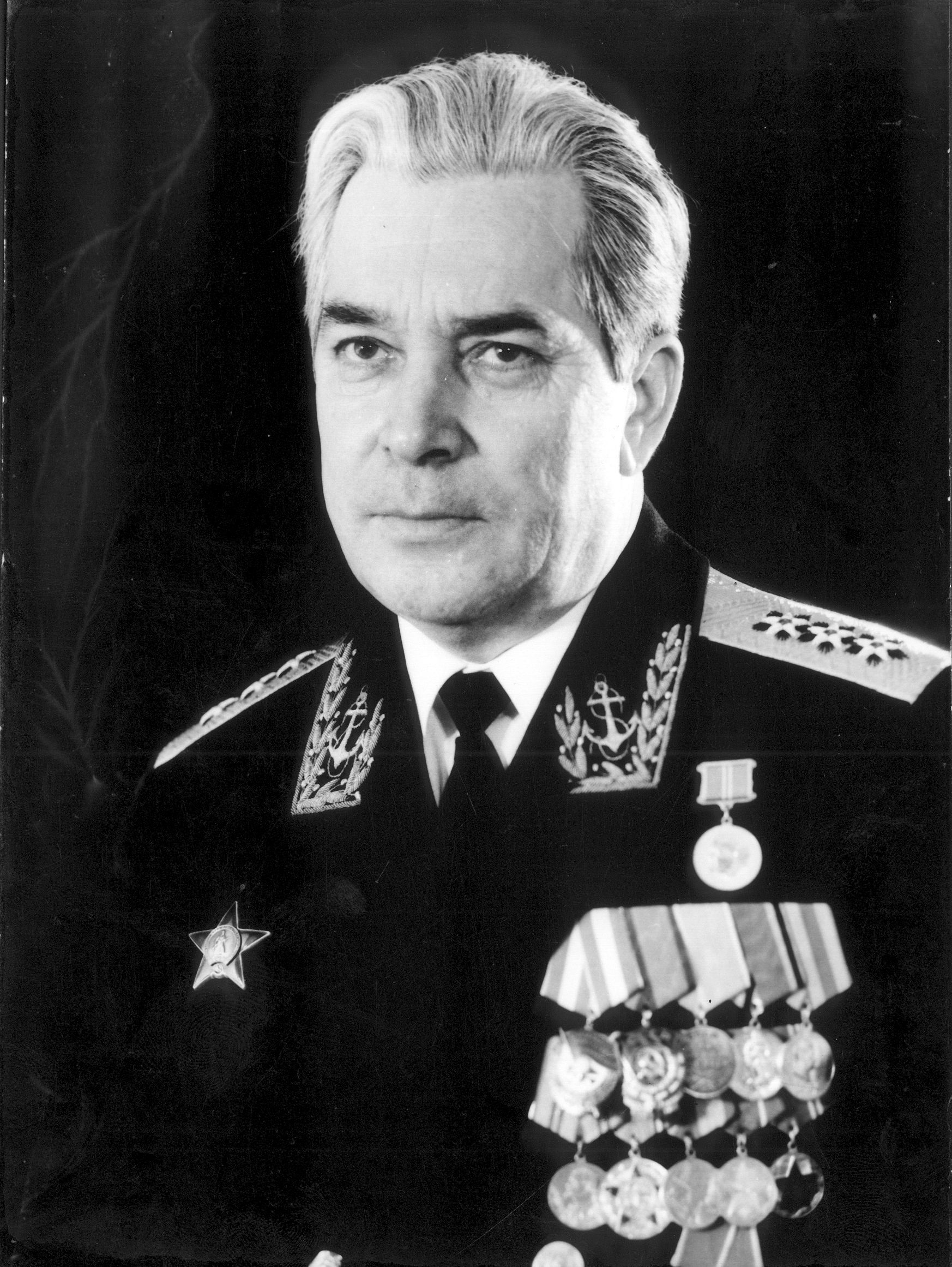
- Born: 10 January 1927; Nekrasovo, Oparinsky District, Northern Dvina Governorate, Russian SFSR, Soviet Union
- Died: 14 August 2009 (aged 82) Moscow, Russia
- Buried: Serafimovskoe Cemetery
- Allegiance: Soviet Union
- Branch: Soviet Navy
- Service years: 1945-1991
- Rank: Admiral
- Commands: 11th Submarine Division; Naval Academy
- Awards: Order of the October Revolution; Order of the Red Banner; Order of the Red Banner of Labour; Order of the Red Star; Order "For Service to the Homeland in the Armed Forces of the USSR" Third Class

Valentin Nikolayevich Ponikarovsky (Russian: Валентин Николаевич Поникаровский; 10 January 1927 — 14 August 2009) was an officer of the Soviet Navy. He reached the rank of admiral, and served as a deputy commander in chief of the Black Sea Fleet between 1975 and 1977, the Northern Fleet between 1977 and 1981, and the head of the Naval Academy from 1981 to 1991.

== Biography ==
Ponikarovsky was born on 10 January 1927 in the village of Nekrasovo, Oparinsky District, in what was then the Northern Dvina Governorate, Russian Soviet Federative Socialist Republic, in the Soviet Union. His parents, Nikolai Elizarovich (1898–1967) and Anna Andreevna (1904–1944), were peasants. He enrolled for a year in the Leningrad Military Mechanical Institute in 1944, but left to enter the M. V. Frunze Higher Naval School. He graduated in 1949, and was assigned to serve aboard submarines in the Black Sea Fleet. Initially a navigator aboard the M-class submarine M-115, he rose to be assistant to the commander of M-237 in the 21st Submarine Division by 1951, and took the Higher Special Officer Classes of the Navy between 1951 and 1952. He then returned to the Black Sea Fleet, and went from executive officer of the under-construction Whiskey-class S-87, to her commander in September 1955. He sailed her to join the Pacific Fleet's 10th Submarine Division that year. He was back in the Northern Fleet by 1957, a captain 2nd rank with command of the Zulu-class B-91 until 1960.

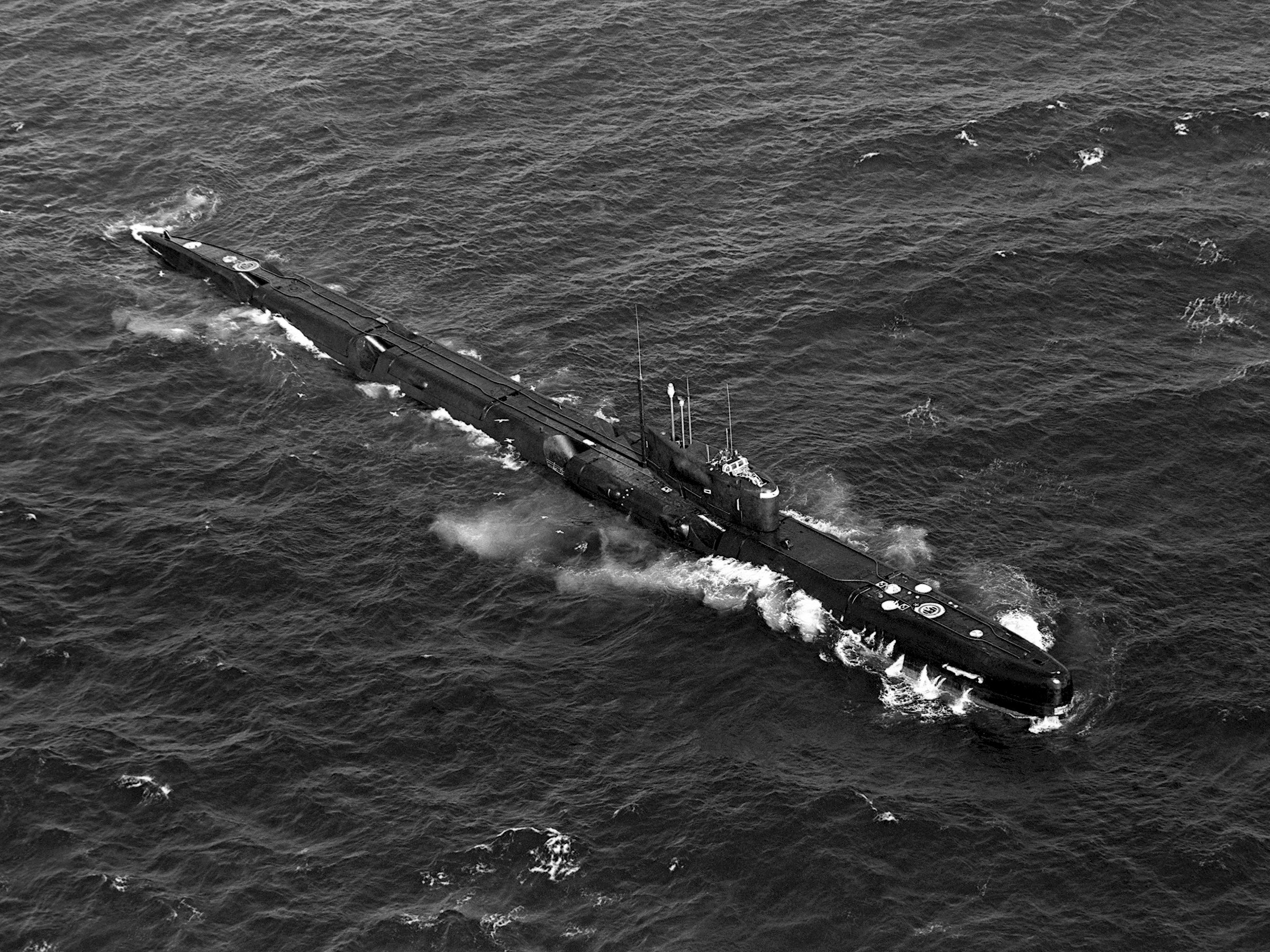
An Echo II-class nuclear missile submarine, sister ship to Ponikarovsky's K-22

Ponikarovsky undertook further studies at the Naval Academy from 1960 until 1963, and on graduating was appointed as a captain 1st rank to command the Echo II-class nuclear missile submarine K-22 in the Northern Fleet's 7th Submarine Division. He held this position until 1966, when he became deputy commander of the 11th Submarine Division, and its commander by in 1968. He was promoted to rear-admiral on 6 November 1970. The division operated the new generation of nuclear submarines then entering service, and carried out long-distance voyages to operate in the Mediterranean. Ponikarovsky personally took part in seven of these. He left the division in 1971, moving to become deputy chief of the Naval General Staff's Operations Directorate. He was based here until 1975, when he became chief of staff of the Black Sea Fleet. Promoted to vice-admiral on 28 October 1976, he returned to the Northern Fleet in 1977 as its chief of staff. He held this post until 1981, being promoted to admiral on 10 February 1981, and becoming the first chief of staff of the Northern Fleet in history to hold that rank.

Ponikarovsky became head of the Naval Academy in 1981, a post he held until his retirement ten years later. He oversaw the increasing use of electronics and computers in training, and developed a number of initiatives, including the return of the academy's orchestra in 1983, which had been disbanded in the 1950s. Ponikarovsky was particularly interested in academic affairs, being a candidate of military sciences, a professor, and a corresponding member of the International Slavic Academy of Sciences. He authored more than 100 scientific papers and publications.

Ponikarovsky retired from the navy in 1991, but remained active in scientific and public affairs. He was president of the International Association of Veterans and Submariners. Ponikarovsky was married, with his wife, Zhanna Azhelovna, born in 1927. She was a physiotherapist. The couple had two sons who followed their father into the navy. Viktor was born in 1951, and retired as a captain 1st rank to serve as a deputy for personnel and security in the Tax Inspectorate. Yevgeny, born in 1959, also retired as a captain 1st rank. Valentin died in Moscow on 14 August 2009, at the age of 82. He was buried in Saint Petersburg's Serafimovskoe Cemetery.

== Honours and awards ==
Over his career Ponikarovsky received the Order of the October Revolution, the Order of the Red Banner, the Order of the Red Banner of Labour, the Order of the Red Star, and the Order "For Service to the Homeland in the Armed Forces of the USSR" Third Class, and various other medals.
