= Order "For Merit in Culture and Art" =

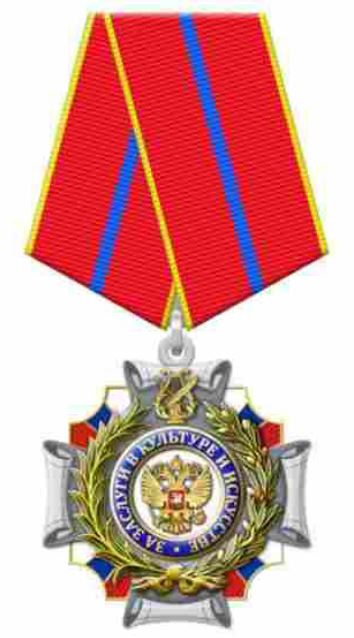
- Obverse of the Order "For Merit in Culture and Art"
- Type: Order
- Awarded for: Achievements in culture and art
- Presented by: Russia (2021–present)
- Eligibility: Russian and foreign citizens
- Status: Being awarded
- Established: 9 August 2021
- Ribbon of the Order "For Merit in Culture and Art"

Precedence
- Next (higher): Order of Pirogov
- Next (lower): Order of Honor

The Order "For Merit in Culture and Art" (Russian: Орден «За заслуги в культуре и искусстве») is a state award of the Russian Federation, established by Decree of the President of the Russian Federation No. 460 of August 9, 2021 to encourage citizens of the Russian Federation and foreign citizens for merits in the field of culture and art.

== Criteria ==
The Order of "Merit in Culture and Art" is awarded to the following citizens:

- For the creation of theatrical performances, films and television films, literary and musical works, concert and circus programs, television and radio programs, works of monumental and decorative art that have received wide recognition from the public and the professional community;
- For the design and construction of unique architectural complexes, buildings, structures;
- For the creation of highly artistic images in theatrical performances and films, works of painting, sculpture and graphics;
- For his great contribution to the study, preservation and popularization of Russian artistic culture and art, the cultural heritage of the peoples of the Russian Federation;
- For special services in organizing and carrying out the restoration and restoration of cultural heritage sites of the peoples of the Russian Federation, the creation of historical and cultural reserves;
- For services in educational activities in the field of culture and art, patriotic and military-patriotic education of youth;
- For services in the development of a system of professional education in the field of arts in order to prepare creative workers for all types of cultural activities, including activities in the field of academic music, opera and ballet art, drama theatre, cinematography, creative (creative) industries, in ensuring high professionalism of Russian performers and their competitiveness at the international level;
- For his great contribution to the creation and development of children's and youth organizations, associations, movements focused on creative, voluntary (volunteer), charitable and educational activities;
- For services in establishing, developing and maintaining international cultural and humanitarian ties;
- For other services in the field of culture and art.

The Order “For Merit in Culture and Art” can be awarded to foreign citizens for active participation in the creative activities of Russian cultural and art organizations, significant contribution to the implementation of joint projects with the Russian Federation in the field of culture and art, popularization and promotion of Russian culture and art abroad, attracting investment in the development of Russian culture and art.

The awarding of a citizen of the Russian Federation with the Order "For Merit in Culture and Art", as a rule, is carried out on the condition that he has another state award of the Russian Federation.

== Design ==
Badge of the Order "For Merit in Culture and Art" made of silver with enamel. It is a straight equal-ended cross with ends decorated in the form of cartouches (ornamental edging in the form of a scroll with folded corners), superimposed on a square plate of silver with gilding, with cut out corners, covered with enamel in the colors of the State Flag of the Russian Federation. In the center of the cross is a round silver medallion with a convex side, covered with white enamel, on it is a relief image of the State Emblem of the Russian Federation in golden color. Along the circumference of the medallion, on a blue enamel border, there is an inscription in straight raised gilded letters: "FOR MERIT IN CULTURE AND ART." The medallion is edged with a wreath of olive and palm branches. The ends of the branches crossed at the bottom are tied with golden ribbon. At the top of the cross there is a relief image of a lyre, superimposed on it is an image of a crossed quill pen and an artistic brush. Both images are golden in color. The distance between the opposite ends of the cross is 40 mm. On the reverse side of the order's badge, the order's motto is written in raised straight letters: “FOR WORK AND TALENTS.” Below, under the motto, is the order number.

The badge of the order is connected to a pentagonal block using an eyelet and a ring. The block is covered with a red silk moire ribbon. There is a yellow border along the edges of the ribbon, and a longitudinal blue stripe in the center. Ribbon width - 24 mm, blue stripe width - 2 mm, border width - 1 mm.

A miniature copy of the badge of the Order of Merit in Culture and Art is worn on the block. The distance between the ends of the cross is 15.8 mm, the height of the block from the top of the lower corner to the middle of the upper side is 19.2 mm, the length of the upper side is 10 mm, the length of each of the sides is 10 mm, the length of each of the sides forming the lower corner, - 10 mm.

When wearing the ribbon of the Order of Merit in Culture and Art on uniform, a strip with a height of 8 mm is used, the width of the ribbon is 24 mm.
