= Kuznetsov Naval Academy =

Navy staff college and postgraduate institution in St. Petersburg, Russia

N. G. Kuznetsov Naval Academy
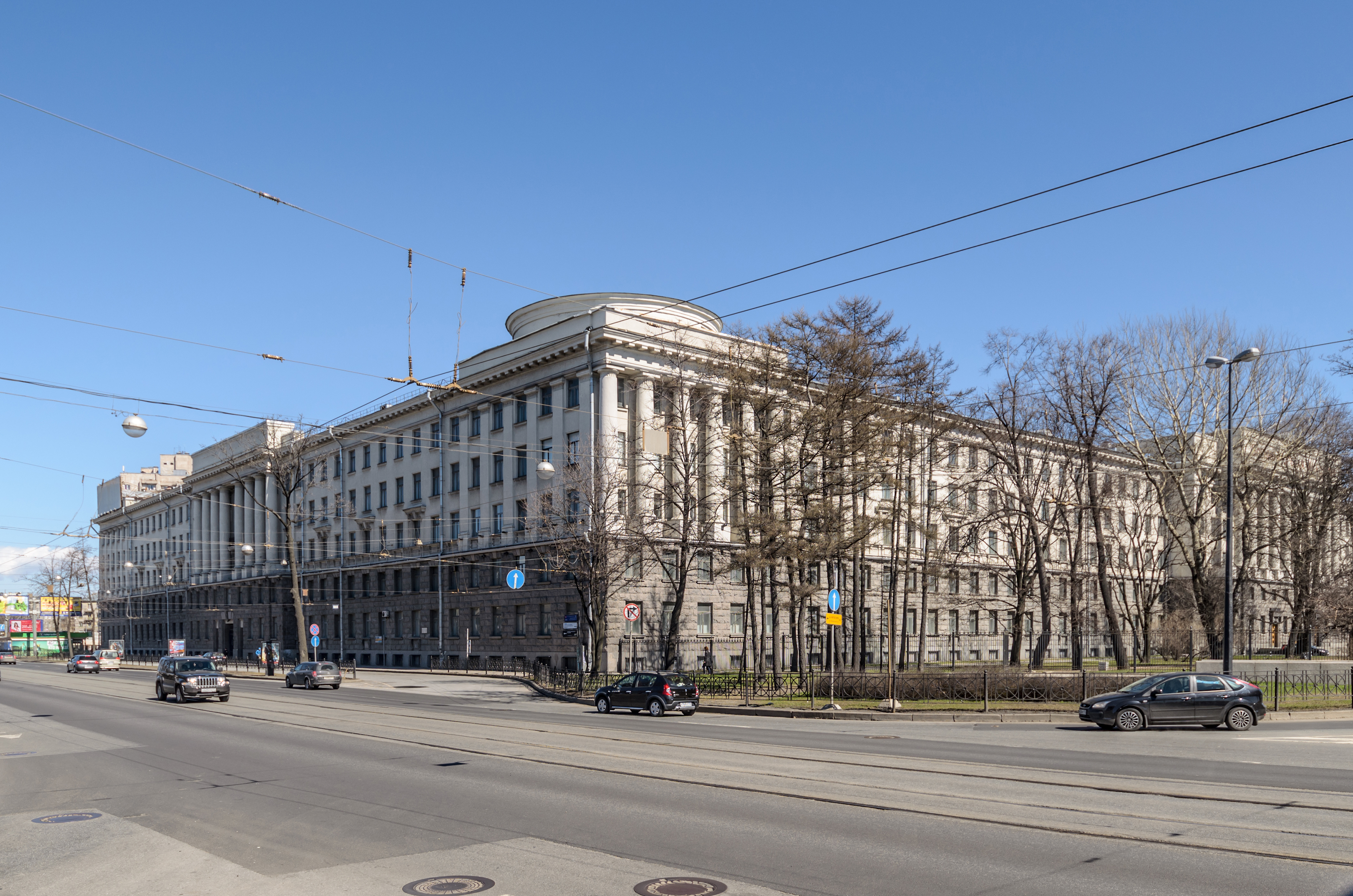
- N. G. Kuznetsov Naval Academy
- Type: Military academy Staff college
- Established: 1827
- Principal: Admiral Nikolai Yevmenov
- Location: Saint Petersburg, Russia; 59°59′04″N 30°18′13″E

The N. G. Kuznetsov Naval Academy (Note: Russian: Военно-морская академия имени Н. Г. Кузнецова, romanized: Voyenno-morskaya akadamiya imyeni N. G. Kuznetsova) is the main staff college and postgraduate institution for the Russian Navy and is located in Saint Petersburg.

In 1827, Admiral Ivan Kruzenshtern initiated an Officers' Class at the Naval Cadet Corps. In 1862 the Class was reorganized into an Academic Course of Maritime Science. In 1877, to mark its 50th anniversary, the Class was renamed the Nikolaev Naval Academy (Nikolayevskaya Morskaya Akademiya) and in 1910 was completely detached from the Naval Cadet Corps. The Academy's last pre-revolutionary class was in 1913.

Towards the end of the Soviet era, the Academy was named the A. A. Grechko Naval Academy and finally was renamed the N. G. Kuznetsov Naval Academy. It is a postgraduate institution somewhat comparable to the U.S. Naval War College and should not be confused with officer commissioning schools such as the U.S. Naval Academy.

== Imperial period ==
=== Advanced Officers' Class (1827–1877) ===
Russian scholar Mikhail Lomonosov envisioned the establishment of a naval academy in 1759. However, only 68 years later, in 1826, did the famous admiral and seafarer Ivan Fedorovich Kruzenshtern propose the establishment of the earliest organizational precursor to today's Naval Academy - the "Advanced Officers' Class" (Вышие офицерский класс) of the Russian Navy which were opened on 25 April 1827 under the Naval Corps. The mission of the Advanced Officers' Class was to improve the theoretical training of the most promising naval officers in exact and applied sciences. As a result of the revolution in naval affairs brought about by the Crimean War (1853–56) and the clear end of the Age of Sail the future of naval education in Russia and its transformation was reviewed by a special commission in 1862.

=== Transition to academy ===
By the 7 August 1862 order of the Naval Minister, the Officers' Class was transformed into the newly established Academic Course of Maritime Sciences having a two-year period of study and divided into three departments: hydrographic, shipbuilding, and mechanical. The graduates of the course provided the navy with scientific officers for the fleets and instructors for the Naval Cadet Corps.

- Nikolayev Naval Academy (1877–1917)

In 1872 the council of the Academic Course developed a proposal for a full-fledged Academy. On 28 January 1877, the 50th anniversary of the establishment of the Officers' Class, by the imperial directive of Aleksandr II the Officers' Class was renamed the Nikolayev Naval Academy. At this time both the Naval Cadet Corps and the Naval Academy were headed by the same naval officer.

- Heads of the Academy during the imperial period
  - Advanced Officers' Class (1827–1877)
    - Krusenstern, Ivan Fyodorovich (1827–1842)
    - Rimskiy-Korsakov, Nikolay Petrovich (1842–1848)
    - Kazin, Nikolay Glebovich (1848–1851)
    - Glazenap, Bogdan Aleksandrovich (1851–1855)
    - Davydov, Aleksey Kuzmich (1855–1857)
    - Nakhimov, Sergey Stepanovich (1857–1861)
    - Rimsky-Korsakov, Voin Andryevich (1861–1871)
    - Epanchin, Aleksey Pavlovich (1871–1882)
  - Nikolayev Naval Academy (1877–1917)
    - Arsenyev, Dmitriy Sergeyevich (1882–1896)
    - Kriger, A.Kh. (1896–1901)
    - Damozhirov, A.I. (1901–1902)
    - Chukhnin, G.P. (1902–1905)
    - Rimskiy-Korsakov, Nikolay Aleksandrovich (1905–1906)
    - Voyevodskiy, Stepan Arkadyevich (1906–1908)
    - Rusin, Aleksandr Ivanovich (1908–1910)
    - Shulgin, Grigoriy Ivanovich (1910–1917)

== Soviet period ==
After October 1917, the various Officers' Classes were combined into a single institution – the Navy Combined Special Officers' Classes. Initially there were five specialties: artillery, mines, submarine, navigation, and electrical equipment. In 1920, two new classes, mechanical and shipbuilding, were added. On 28 September 1920, the classes were classified as a higher special naval educational institution. In the fall of 1925, the institution was renamed Special Courses for Improving Fleet Commanders and later as Special Courses for the Navy Command Staff. In 1938, the Courses received their own building (Bldg 80 Malookhtenskiy Prospekt, St. Petersburg) and they remain there today. In 1939, they were again renamed – Advanced Special Courses for the Command Staff of the Workers' & Peasants Navy. During the 900-day siege of Leningrad, the Courses were moved and continued to function in Astrakhan and Samarkand. In 1946, the Courses transitioned to a peacetime work regime and received the name they carry today – Navy Advanced Special Officers' Classes (Вышие спецальные офицерские классы ВМФ).

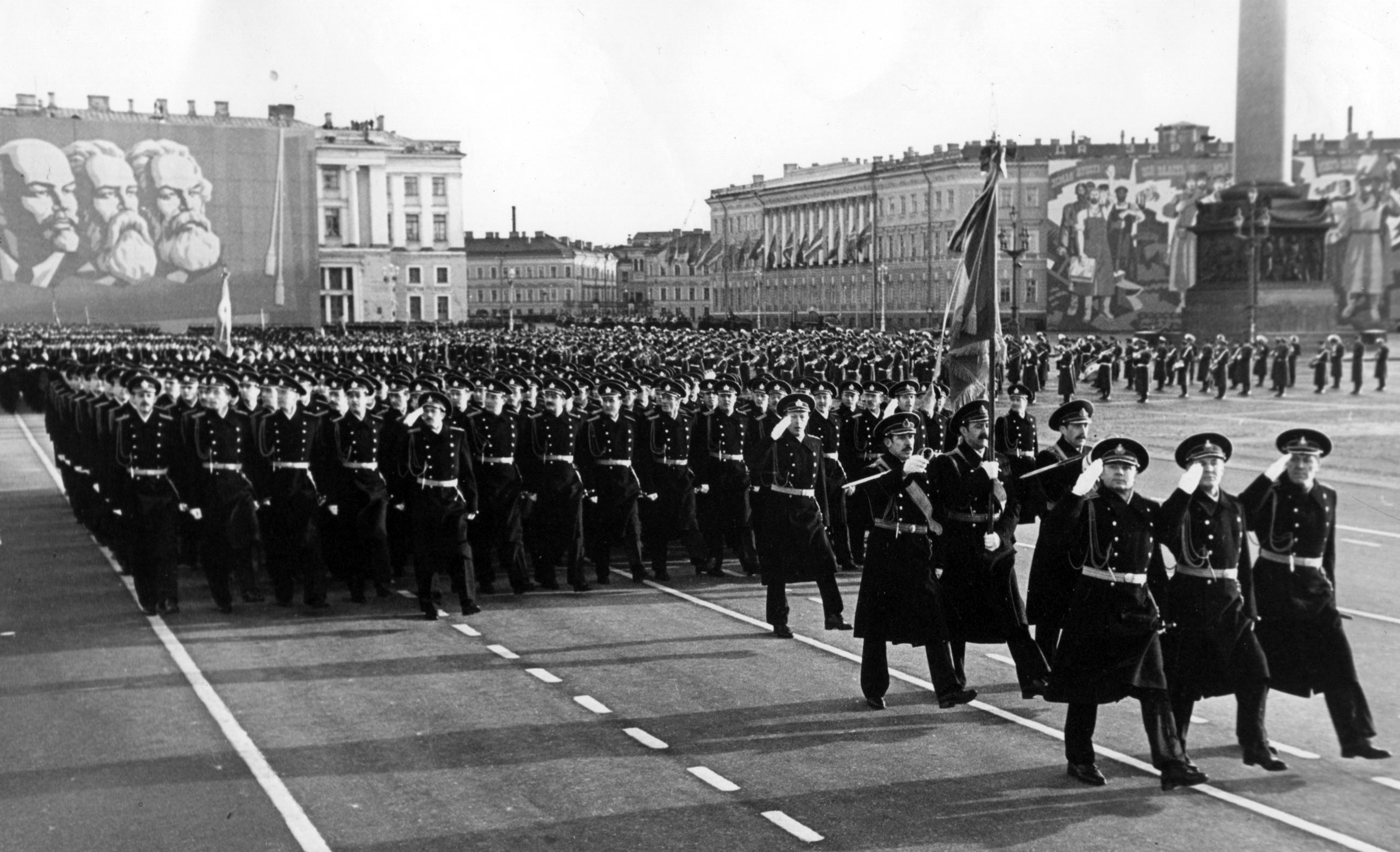
The academy, led by Captain Anatoliy Karpenko, during a parade on Leningrad's Palace Square in 1983.

- Heads of the Academy during the Soviet period
  - Maritime Academy (1917–1922)
    - Klado, Nikolay Leontiyevich (1917–1919)
    - Krylov, Aleksey Nikolayevich (1919–1920)
    - Zherve, Boris Borisovich (1920–1921)
  - RKKF Naval Academy (1922–1931)
    - Petrov, Mikhail Aleksandrovich (1921–1923
    - Zherve, Boris Borisovich (1923–1930)
    - Dushenov, Konstantin Ivanovich (1930)
    - Duplitskiy, Dmitriy Sergeyevich (1930–1933)
  - K.E. Voroshilov RKKF Naval Academy (1931–1938)
    - Okunev, Grigoriy Sergeyevich (1933)
    - Stasevich, Pavel Grigoryevich (1933–1936)
    - Ludri, Ivan Martynovich (1937)
  - RK Navy K.E. Voroshilov Naval Academy (1938–1944)
    - Stavitskiy, Sergey Petrovich (1937–1938)
    - Isakov, Ivan Stepanovich (1938–1939)
    - Stepanov, Georgiy Andreyevich (1939–1941)
    - Petrovskiy, Vladimir Alekseyevich (1942–1944)
  - Order of Lenin K.E. Voroshilov Naval Academy (1944–1960)
    - Abankin, Pavel Sergeyevich (1944–1945)
    - Alafuzov, Vladimir Antonovich (1945–1948)
    - Panteleyev, Yuriy Aleksandrovich (1948–1951)
    - Yumashev, Ivan Stepanovich (1951–1957)
    - Andreyev, Vladimir Aleksandrovich (1957–1960)
    - Panteleyev, Yuriy Aleksandrovich (1960–1967)
  - Order of Lenin Naval Academy (1960-1968)
  - Order of Lenin and Ushakov Naval Academy (1968–1976)
    - Oryol, Aleksandr Yefstafyevich (1967–1974)
  - Order of Lenin and Ushakov Marshal of the Soviet Union A.A. Grechko Naval Academy (1976–1977)
  - Order of Lenin, October Revolution, and Ushakov Marshal of the Soviet Union A.A. Grechko Naval Academy (1976–1990)
    - Sysoyev, Viktor Sergeyevich (1974–1981)
    - Ponikarovsky, Valentin Nikolayevich (1981–1991)

== Post-Soviet period ==
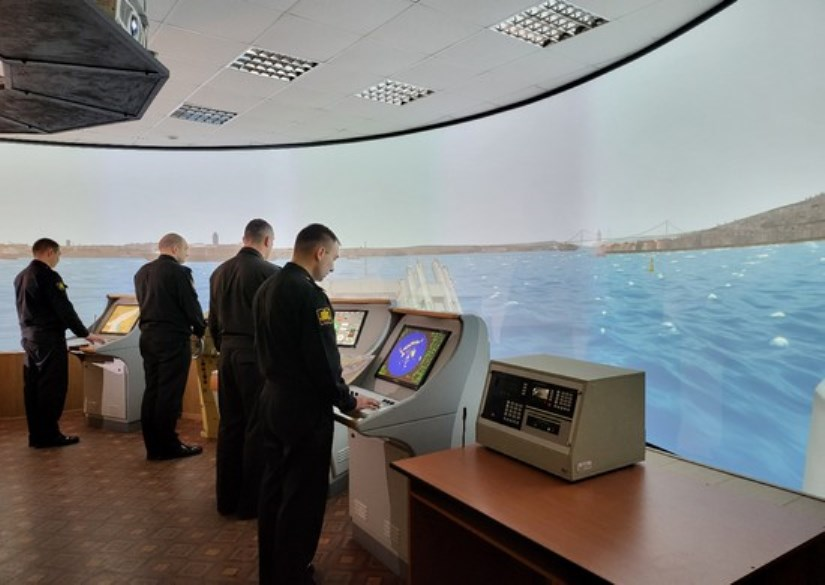
Navigators of the Russian Navy undergo retraining at the Mostik-2000 training complex

- N.G. Kuznetsov Naval Academy
- Heads of the Academy since 1991
  - Order of Lenin, October Revolution, Ushakov Admiral of the Fleet of the Soviet Union N.G. Kuznetsov Naval Academy (1990–2008)
    - Ivanov, Vitaly Petrovich (1991–1995)
    - Yeryomin, Vasily Petrovich (1995–2003)
    - Sysuyev, Yuri Nikolayevich (2003–2008)
  - Federal State Military Educational Establishment of Higher Professional Education "Military Training and Research Center of the Navy" Admiral of the Fleet of the Soviet Union N. G. Kuznetsov Naval Academy (2008–present)
    - Rimashevsky, Adam Adamovich (2008–2012)
    - Maksimov, Nikolai Mikhailovich (2012–2016)
    - Nosatov, Aleksandr Mikhailovich (2016)
    - Kasatonov, Vladimir Lvovich (2016–2019)
    - Sokolov, Viktor Nikolayevich (2020–2022)
    - Karpov, Aleksandr Vadimovich (acting) (2022–2024)
    - Yevmenov, Nikolai Anatolyevich (2024–present)

=== Present day ===
The Advanced Officers' Classes are separate from the N.G. Kuznetsov Naval Academy and provide more focused and specialized study to prepare naval officers for assignment as Commanding Officers or for the advancement of technical qualifications for Flag Specialists. Today the "Classes" are the only institution of their type for retraining and advancing qualifications. 40 different specialties are covered encompassing officers of the entire tactical level of the navy. The basic aspect of training is that it covers what is directly and practically required now and in the immediate future by the fleet. Since 1918, the academy has prepared more than 19,000 commanding officers and 20,000 flag specialists. On 28 January 2007 the Classes marked their 180th anniversary.
