= Higher Special Officer Classes of the Navy =

Russian naval education institution

Coordinates: 59°55′40.25″N 30°24′01.63″E

- Высшие специальные офицерские классы ВМФ
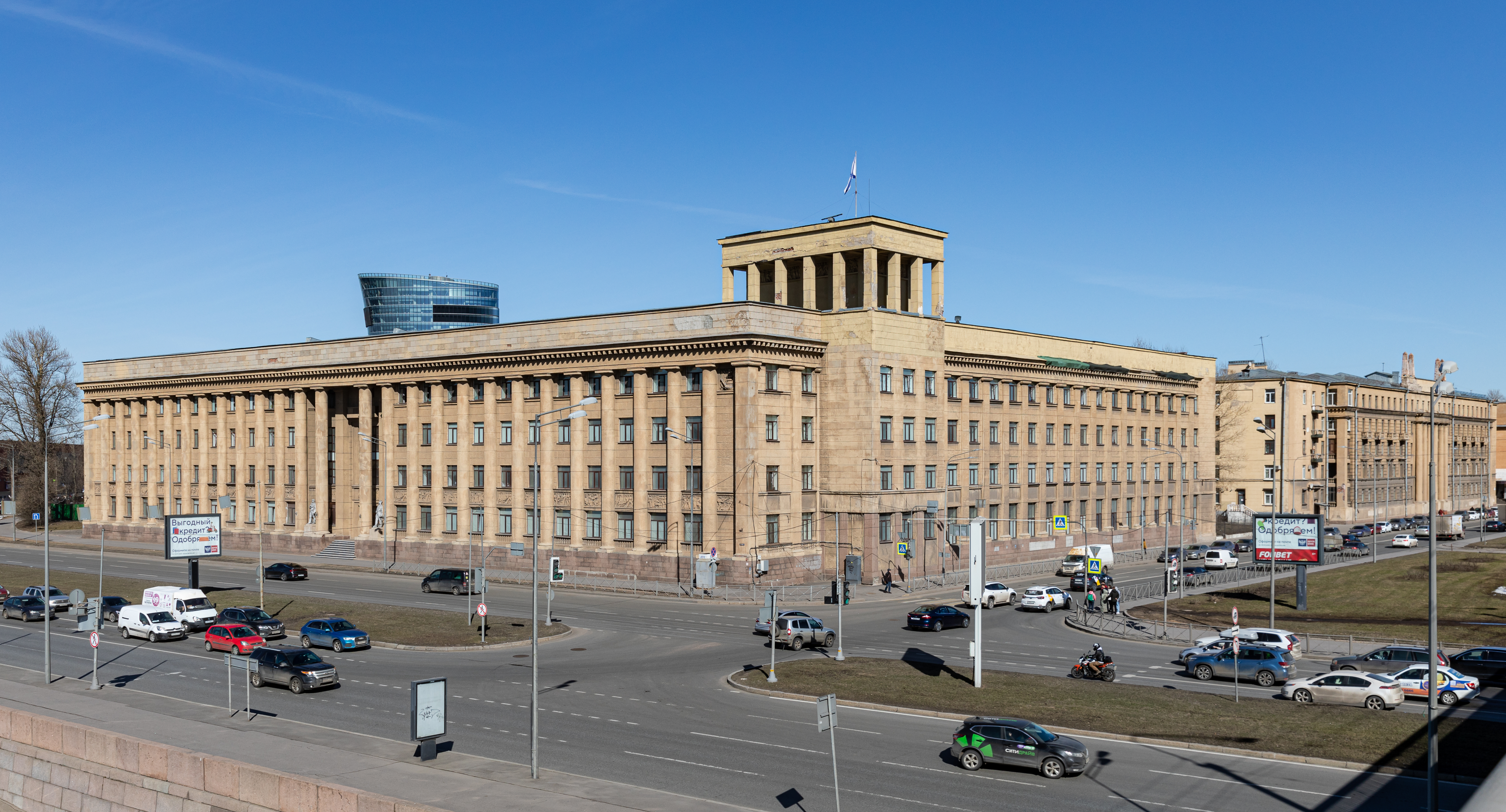
- Type: Advanced Naval Education
- Established: 1923
- President: Admiral Igor Osipov
- Location: 80/2 Malookhtinsky Prospect, 190013, Saint Petersburg, Russia

The Higher Special Officer Classes of the Navy, formally the Higher Special Officer Order of Lenin Classes of the Navy (Russian: Высшие специальные офицерские ордена Ленина классы Военно-Морского Флота), and known by its abbreviation VSOK VMF (Russian: ВСОК ВМФ) is a higher naval education institution in Saint Petersburg which educates serving officers of the Russian Navy in specialisations for more senior ranks and positions.

Since 2012 its official name has been Military Institute (further professional education) of the Military Scientific Center of the Navy "Naval Academy" (Russian: Военный институт (дополнительного профессионального образования) ВУНЦ ВМФ «Военно-морская академия»).

== Predecessors ==
Specialist professional classes had been established in the Imperial Russian Navy as technological developments had neccessited the need for further education in new fields of naval warfare. Naval reforms under Emperor Paul I established special officer classes in Kronstadt, Rochensalm, Reval, Nikolayev, and Sevastopol by decree of 26 January 1797. Naval education then continued to be developed through the Naval Cadet Corps and specialist schools of navigation, with the Higher Officer Classes being created at the Naval Cadet Corps on 28 January 1827, under the leadership of Admiral Ivan Kruzenshtern. The officer classes became the Academic Course of Marine Sciences in 1862, consisting of the hydrographic, shipbuilding and mechanical faculties. On 28 January 1877, this course was split from the cadet corps, eventually becoming the Naval Academy.

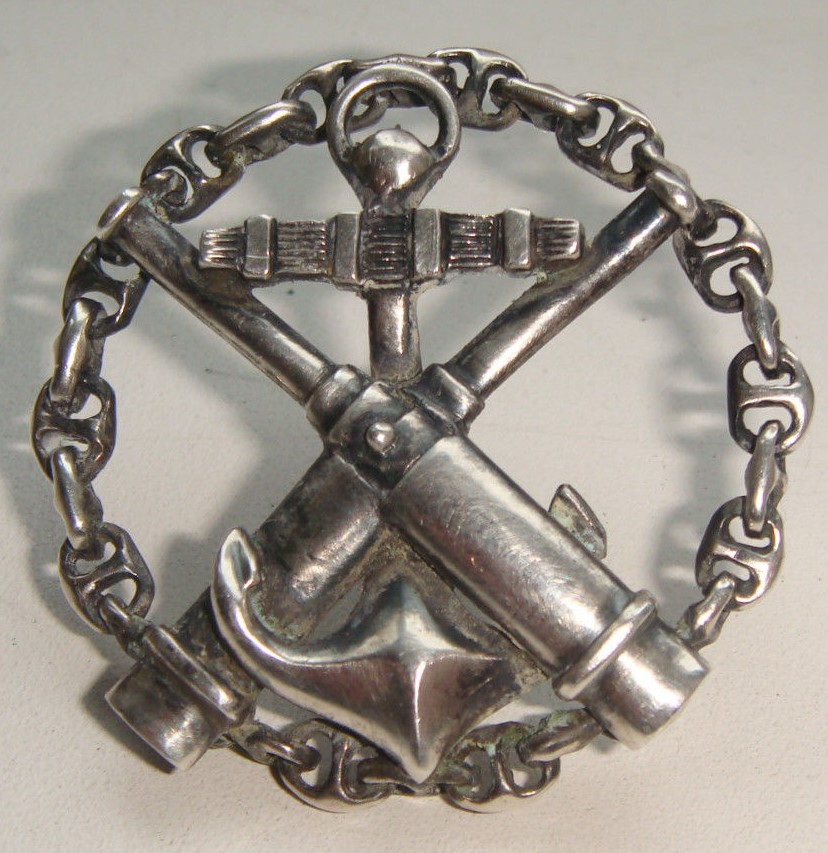
Badge of the Artillery Officer Class, opened in 1878

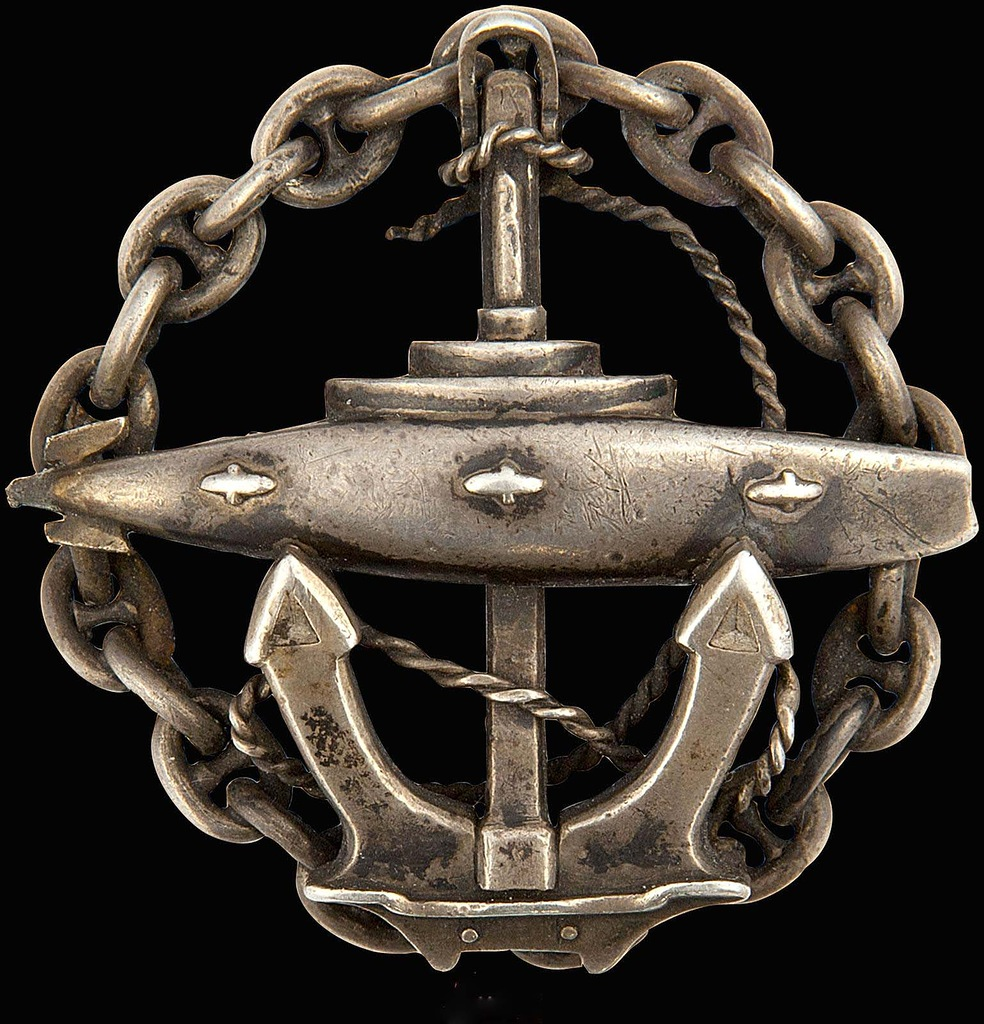
Badge of the Submarine Officer Class, opened in 1906

In the meantime the need for officer specialities in different fields resulted in the opening of special officer classes. The first was the establishment of the Mine Officer Class at the Kronstadt naval base in 1874. This was followed by the Artillery Officer Class in 1878, and following the Russo-Japanese War, the Submarine Officer Class in 1906, and the Navigation Officer Class in 1909. Education was a mixture of classroom lessons, laboratory work, and practical experience aboard ships. Basic initial naval education to prospective naval officers was thus provided by the Naval Cadet Corps, further additional training in specialities was provided by the Officer Classes, before receiving the higher level of education at the Naval Academy.

The classes were united into a single naval educational institution following the February and October Revolutions, by Naval General Staff order on 26 October 1918, and known as the Combined Special Officer Classes of the Navy (Russian: Соединенные специальные офицерские классы ВМФ). These trained specialists in artillery, mine warfare, underwater, navigation and electrical engineering, and additionally from 1920, mechanical engineering and shipbuilding. On 28 September 1920, the classes were categorised as a higher special naval educational institution by the Revolutionary Military Council.

== History ==
=== Establishment ===
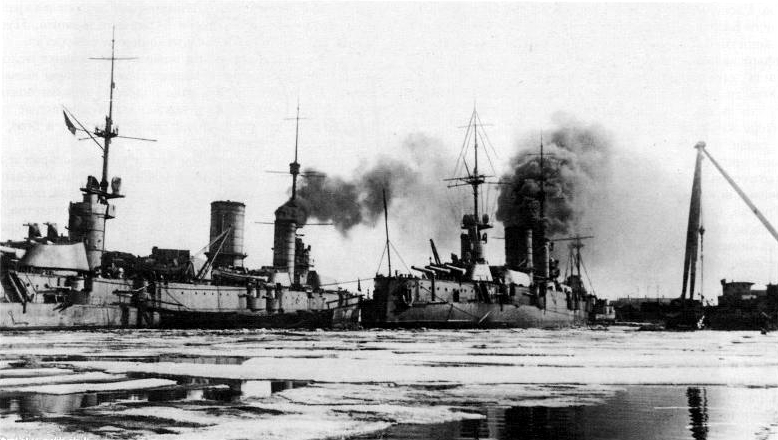
Battleships in Kronstadt in 1921. The Higher Special Officer Classes trained specialists for officer positions across the Soviet fleet.

The Higher Special Officer Classes of the Navy were officially created by the 17 October 1923 order of the Revolutionary Military Council. At this stage they were termed the Higher Special Courses for the Command Staff of the Fleet (Russian: Высшие специальные курсы командного состава флота) or VSKKSF (Russian: ВСККСФ). The courses provided training in artillery, mine warfare, and navigation, as well as the submarine classes transferred from the Naval Academy, and were housed in an outbuilding of the Naval School, with the head of the naval school also serving as head of the courses. The first intake was enrolled on 1 December 1923, with an 18-month training period. Education was a mixture of classroom lessons, laboratory work, and practical experience aboard ships. The Revolutionary Military Council issued order No. 2702 on 15 December that year, regulating the courses and granting them status of higher educational institutions. The curriculum was further refined by the establishment of subject-method commissions in March 1924. The courses were renamed the "Special courses for the improvement of the command staff of the RKKF" (Russian: Специальные курсы усовершенствования командного состава РККФ) or SKUKS RKKF (Russian: СКУКС РККФ) on 21 January 1925, and were separated from the Naval Academy to become an independent naval educational institution. The training period was shortened to 12 months, with candidates being mid-level officers who had already served for two years, though the submarine class accepted students graduating directly from the Naval School.

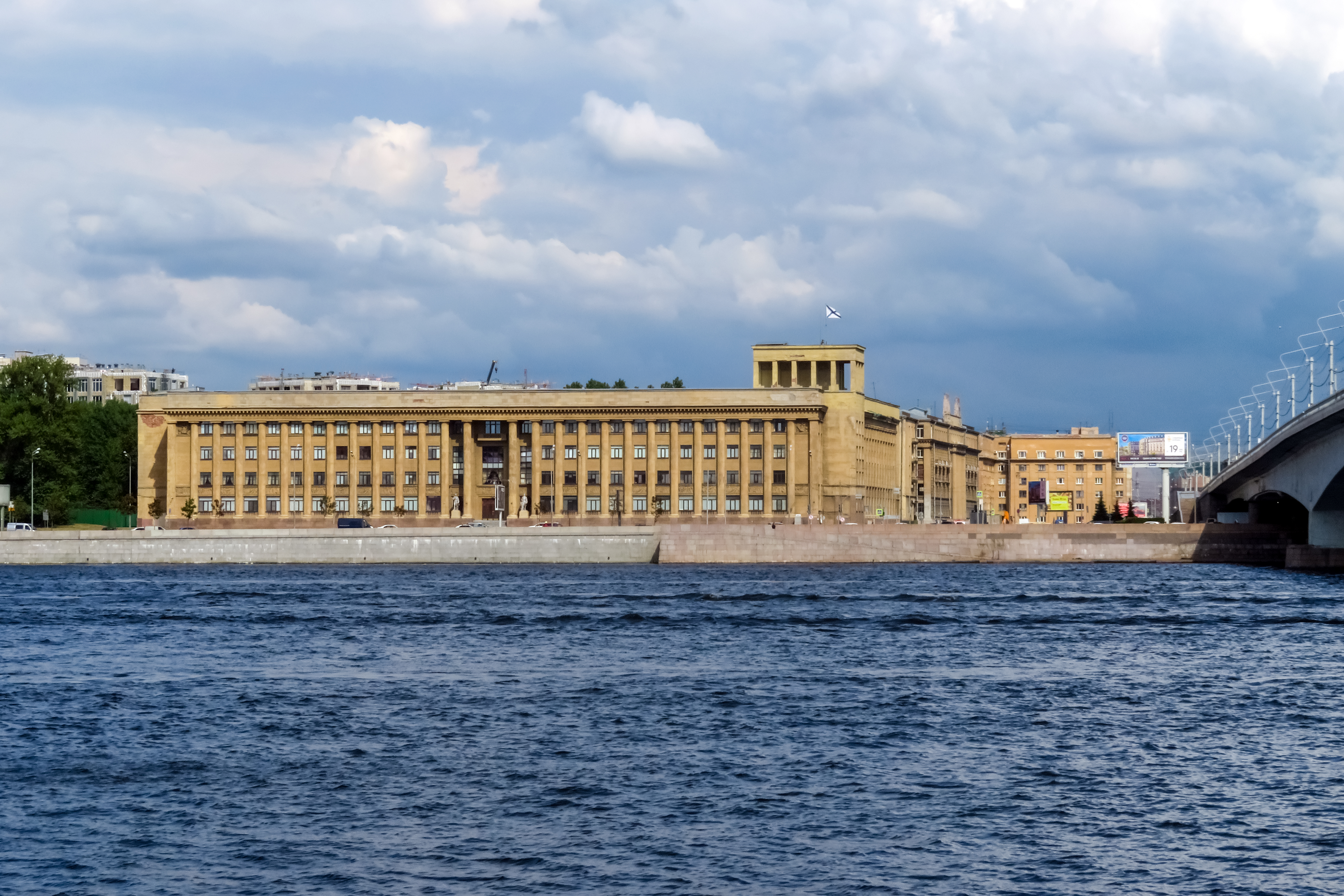
The Higher Special Officer Classes have occupied this building since 1938, seen here across the Neva

The first graduation from the new courses took place on 7 February 1925, and the following year they were renamed twice in succession, becoming the Special Advanced Training Courses for the Command Staff of the Red Army Navy, and then from 21 November 1926, the Special Courses for the Command Staff of the Red Army Navy. In 1927, the entry requirements were changed to those under 32 who had graduated from the naval school and had at least two years practical experience in the fleet. In 1931, the courses received the honorific name Special Courses for the Command Staff of the Red Army Navy named after the Central Executive Committee of the Tatar ASSR. On 14 November that year, the course's submarine classes were transferred to the Baltic Fleet's new training detachment, though the courses continued to train officers in submarine navigation and mining specialities. By the mid-1930s the courses were also offering training in navigation, naval artillery, mine and torpedo warfare, communications, coastal artillery, chemical warfare, cryptography and staff work. The classes moved into a specially constructed building at 80/2 Malookhtinsky Prospect in 1938.

=== Wartime ===
In 1939, the honorific "Central Executive Committee of the Tatar ASSR" was dropped, and in August 1939, the courses were renamed the Higher Special Courses for command staff of the RKVMF (VSK). With the Axis invasion of the Soviet Union in 1941, the classes began an abbreviated course to quickly provide graduates with training. With the rapid advance of Axis forces by the summer of 1941, Leningrad came under threat. In July 1941, People's Commissar of the Navy Nikolai Kuznetsov ordered the classes to evacuate to Astrakhan. The training and laboratory equipment was dismantled in August, and transported to the new location in two echelons in August and September that year. Training continued with a shortened six-month program in 1942, by August that year, Astrakhan itself was threatened by enemy advances, and a second evacuation took place to Samarkand. There the courses shared the premises of Samarkand University with the Naval Academy, which had also been evacuated from Leningrad. In July 1943, the courses returned to being 12 months in duration, and on 9 September 1943, they were renamed the Special Courses for Officers of the Navy (SKOS). With the lifting of the siege of Leningrad, the courses returned to the city in August 1944, ultimately having trained over 1,500 officers during the war. The work done by the courses was recognised with the award of the Order of Lenin on 20 April 1945, and the adoption of the name Highest Order of Lenin Special Classes of the Navy Officers (VOLSOK) in July 1945.

== Modern courses ==
On 17 March 2000, the classes received a state registration and license, being accredited as an "Academy of additional professional education". The courses were officially renamed the Military Institute (further professional education) of the Military Scientific Center of the Navy "Naval Academy" on 1 July 2012, in accordance with Order No. 545 on 15 March 2012 addressing military educational reform. Over the course of its existence, the classes have held more than 120 class graduations. The classes train officers who have experience in the navy, and are preparing for promotion to more senior ranks and positions, namely as executive officers or independent command of ships and submarines, and staff officers in divisions, brigades and squadrons. A full-term course lasts 10 months, while there are also short-term two-, three- and four-month courses. Roughly 40% of the training time is devoted to theoretical issues, and 60% to practicals. The classes offer training in 40 naval specialties. Postgraduate studies are offered in three scientific specialties, and there is a department for training foreign specialists.

== Commanders ==
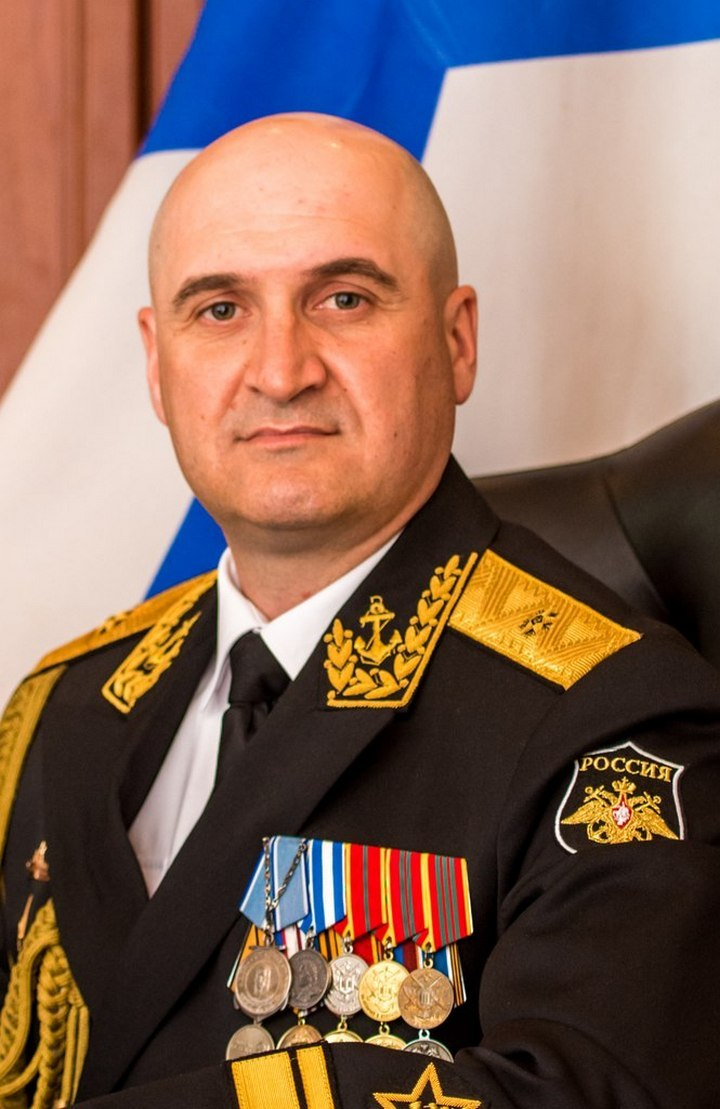
Admiral Igor Osipov, head of the Higher Special Officer Classes of the Navy since 2024

- Vadim Ivanov (1941–1942)
- Konstantin Korenev (1942–1955)
- Pyotr Mikhailov (1955–1960)
- Viktor Parkhomenko (1960–1964)
- Giorgi Abashvili (1964–1971)
- Aleksandr Petelin (1971–1973)
- N. M. Baranov (1973–1974)
- Ya. N. Globa (1974–1979)
- Boris Gromov (1979–1989)
- A. P. Yeryomenko (1989–1993)
- Yuri Ustimenko (1995–1999)
- Yuri Sysuyev (1999–2003)
- Adam Rimashevsky (2003–2008)
- S. P. Yancha (2008–2010)
- Yu. S. Rebenok (2010–2012)
- A. D. Shuvanov (2012 — 2020)
- V. F. Kulit (2021–2024)
- Igor Osipov (2024—present)
