= Order of Naval Merit (Russia) =

State award of the Russian Federation

Order "For Naval Merit"
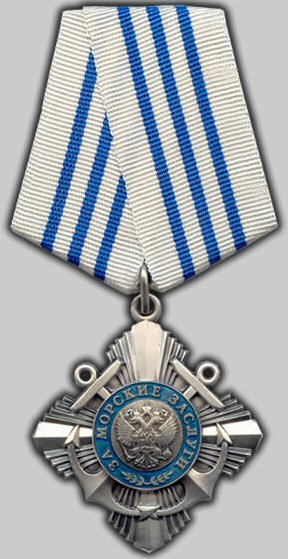
- Order "For Naval Merit" (obverse)
- Type: Single grade order
- Awarded for: Excellence in worldwide oceanic activities in favour of Russian military and economic security
- Presented by: Russian Federation
- Eligibility: Citizens of the Russian Federation
- Status: Active
- Established: February 27, 2002
- First award: December 17, 2002
- Ribbon of the Order For Naval Merit

Precedence
- Next (higher): Order "For Military Merit"
- Next (lower): Order of Pirogov

The Order "For Naval Merit" (Russian: Орден «За морские заслуги») is a state decoration of the Russian Federation bestowed for excellence in military or economic maritime endeavours. It was established on February 27, 2002 by Decree of the President of the Russian Federation № 245. Its statute was amended by presidential decree № 1099 of September 7, 2010.

== Award statute ==
The Order "For Naval Merit" is awarded to citizens of the Russian Federation: for achievements in the exploration, development and use of the oceans in the interest of national defence and for ensuring its economic and social development; for achievements in the development and implementation of the latest technology and equipment for the Russian Navy; for services in maintaining, expanding, researching and using the exclusive oceanic economic zone of the Russian Federation; for achievements in the fight against illegal actions of pirates and poachers aimed at causing environmental and economic damage likely to ill affect the reputation and interests of the Russian Federation in its exclusive oceanic economic zone, as well as attacks against ships flying the national flag of the Russian Federation on the oceans; for skillful organization and conduct of naval exercises and manoeuvres, during which all goals were fully achieved.

The Order "For Naval Merit" is worn on the left side of the chest and when worn in the presence of other medals and Orders of the Russian Federation, it is located immediately after the Order "For Military Merit".

== Award description ==
The badge of the Order is in the shape of a 40 mm wide four pointed cross made of enamelled silver. Two anchors cross behind a central medallion bearing the coat of arms of the Russian Federation. The central medallion edge is enamelled in blue and bears the inscription "FOR NAVAL MERIT" (Russian: "ЗА МОРСКИЕ ЗАСЛУГИ").

The Order "For Naval Merit" is suspended by a ring through the badge's suspension loop to a standard Russian pentagonal mount covered by an overlapping 24 mm wide white silk moiré ribbon with three central 2 mm wide longitudinal blue stripes separated by 3 mm.

== Notable recipients (partial list) ==
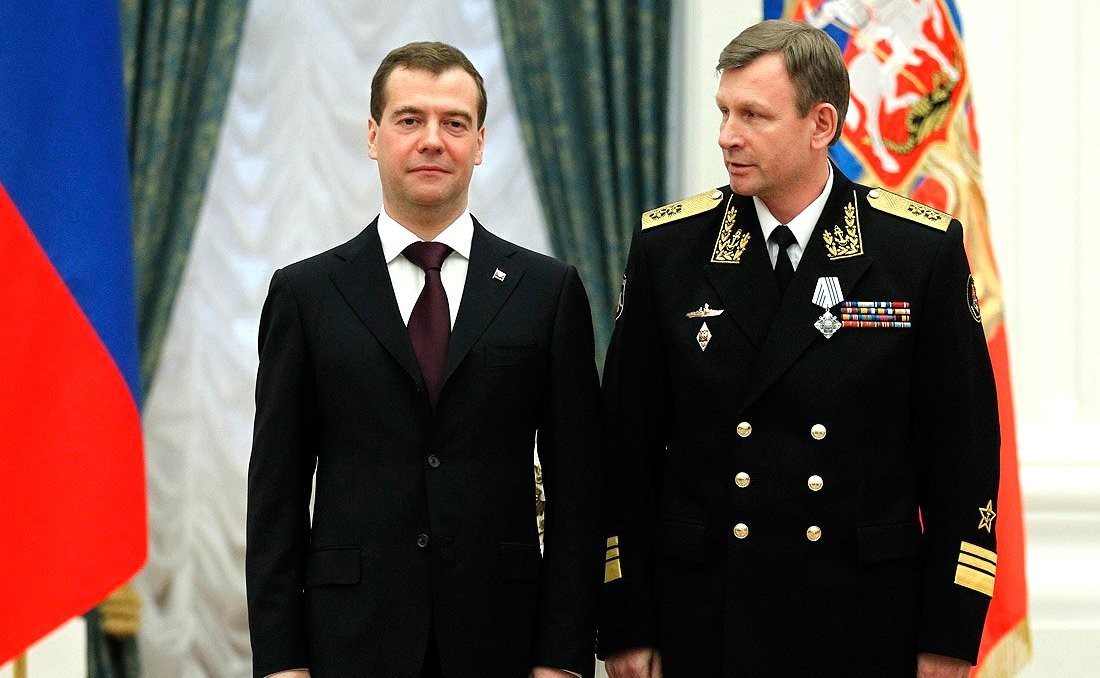
Commander of the Baltic Fleet, Vice Admiral Viktor Chirkov, being awarded the Order "For Naval Merit" by president Dmitriy Medvedev on February 21, 2011. (Photo www.kremlin.ru)

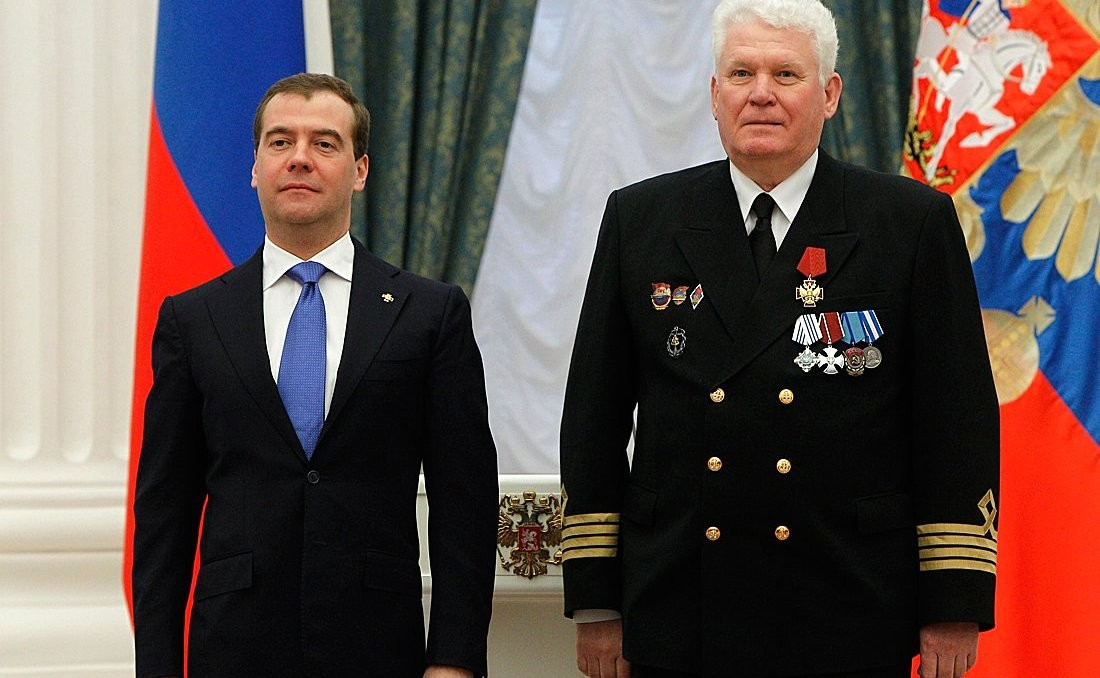
Gennady Antokhin, master of a "FESCO" icebreaker, wearing his Order "For Naval Merit" with President Dmitriy Medvedev on May 3, 2012. (Photo www.kremlin.ru)

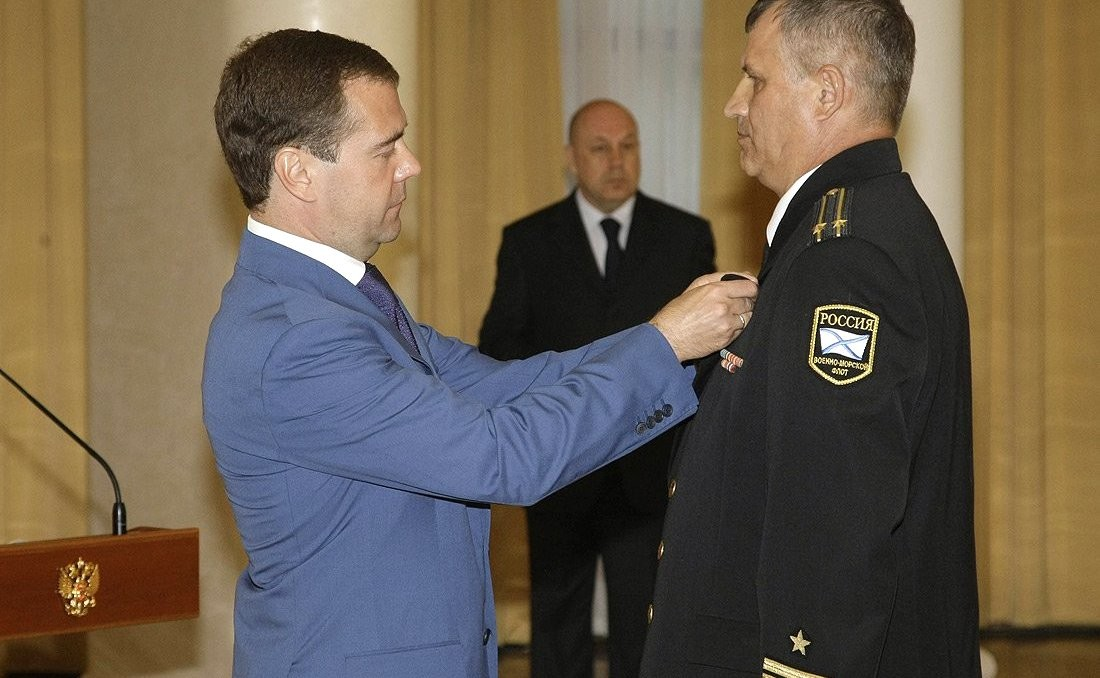
Captain 2nd Rank Viktor Lapshin being decorated with the Order "For Naval Merit" by President Dmitriy Medvedev on July 13, 2009 for distinction in the fight against Somali pirates. (Photo www.kremlin.ru)

The individuals listed below were recipients of the Order "For Naval Merit".

- Nikolay Aibulatov, Head of the Laboratory of the Institute of Oceanology of the Russian Academy of Sciences, Moscow
- Gennadiy Antokhin, icebreaker captain, Far East Shipping Company
- Sergei Avakyants, Admiral, Russian Federation Navy
- Valentin Avilov, Deputy General Director - Director of military equipment production of the Northern Machine Building Enterprise
- Arnold Bogdanovich Budretsky, leading expert of the Russian Antarctic Expedition of the Arctic and Antarctic Research Institute
- Vladimir Chernavin, Fleet Admiral, the last Commander-in-Chief of the Soviet Navy
- Artur Chilingarov, Polar explorer
- Viktor Chirkov, Commander of the Baltic Fleet, Commander-in-Chief of the Russian Navy
- Andrei A. Dyachkov, Director General Rubin Design Bureau
- Mikhail Izrailevich Genin, Chief Engineer and head of the Zvezdochka naval repair yards, Arkhangelsk Oblast
- Stuart Gold, Royal Navy, (UK)
- Oleg G. Gurinov, Captain 1st Rank, Russian Federation Navy
- Peter Hattell, Royal Navy, (UK)
- Mikhail Sergeyevich Kaloshin, Captain of the scientific vessel Akademik Fyodorov of the Arctic and Antarctic Research Institute
- Gennady Kolomna, Captain of the training vessel Kruzenshtern of the Baltic Fishing Fleet State Academy
- Viktor Lapshin, Captain 2nd Rank, Russian Federation Navy
- Valery Lukin, Deputy Director of the Arctic and Antarctic Research Institute - head of the Russian Antarctic Expedition
- Nikolai Maksimov, Admiral, Russian Federation Navy
- Gennady G. Matishov, Academician and Director of the Murmansk Marine Biological Institute
- Yuri Ivanovich Matveev, Director of the Federal State Research and Production Enterprise for marine geological exploration "Sevmorgeo"
- Aleksandr Nosatov, Admiral, Russian Federation Navy
- Igor Osipov, Vice-Admiral, Russian Federation Navy
- Ivan V. Polozhiy, Rear-Admiral, Russian Federation Navy
- Ian Riches, Commander, Royal Navy (UK)
- Viktor Yagubov, head of the polar marine section of the Federal Service for Hydrometeorology and Environmental Monitoring
- Nikolay Kuzmich Zorchenko, Captain of the training vessel Pallada of the Far Eastern State Technical Fisheries University

== See also ==
- Awards and decorations of the Russian Federation
