= Soviet destroyer Gordy =

Gordy is the name of the following ships of the Soviet Navy:

- Soviet destroyer Gordy (1937), a Gnevny-class destroyer sunk by mines in 1941
- Soviet destroyer Gordy (1960), a Kanin-class destroyer in commission 1961–1987

== See also ==
- Gordy (disambiguation)
