= Nikolai Martynyuk =

Soviet naval officer (1934–2021)

- Native name: Николай Ильич Мартынюк
- Born: 22 April 1934; Tamga, Lesozavodsky District, Primorsky Krai, Russian SFSR, Soviet Union
- Died: 10 April 2021 (aged 86) Vladivostok, Russian Federation
- Buried: Maritime Cemetery, Vladivostok
- Allegiance: Soviet Union; Russia
- Branch: Soviet Navy
- Service years: 1956–1991
- Rank: Vice-Admiral
- Awards: Order of the Red Star; Order "For Service to the Homeland in the Armed Forces of the USSR" Third Class

Nikolai Ilyich Martynyuk (Russian: Николай Ильич Мартынюк; 22 April 1934 – 10 April 2021) was an officer of the Soviet Navy. He rose to command his own vessels, reaching the rank of vice admiral in 1985, and serving as First Deputy Chief of Staff of the Pacific Fleet between 1984 and 1991.

== Naval career ==
Martynyuk was born into a peasant family on 22 April 1934 in the village of Tamga, Lesozavodsky District, in Primorsky Krai, then part of the Russian Soviet Socialist Federative Republic, in the Soviet Union. He attended the Pacific Higher Naval School, graduating with honours in 1956. Between 1956 and 1966 he served on various surface ships of the Kamchatka Flotilla, rising through the ranks from commander of the ship's control group, and weapons commander on the SKR-55 of the 86th separate battalion of patrol ships, to commanding two minesweepers, including the BTShch-91 and the Project 30bis destroyer Bezboyaznenny. Between 1965 and 1966 he was a student at the Faculty of the Navy at the Military-Diplomatic Academy of the Soviet Army, and after completing his studies, was sent in 1966 to serve in the Northern Fleet. He remained with the fleet until 1969, during which time he commanded the Project 57bis destroyer Derzkiy.

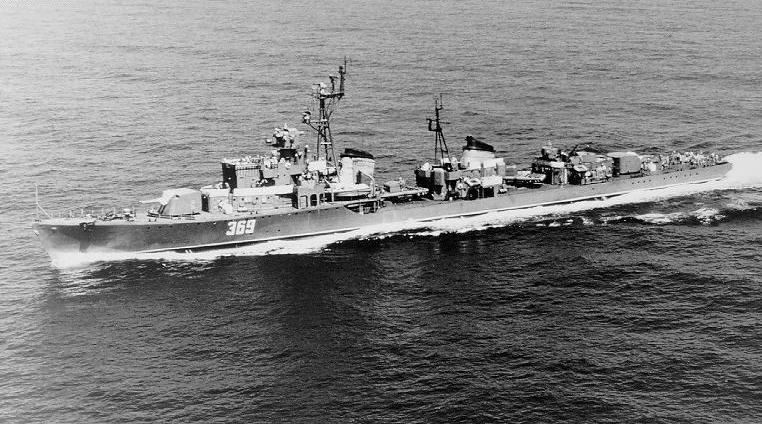
The Project 30bis destroyer Serioznyi in 1968, a sister ship of Martynyuk's command, Bezboyaznenny

Martynyuk undertook further studies between 1969 and 1971, this time at the A. A. Grechko Naval Academy, graduating with honours. In 1971 he joined the Pacific Fleet, where he would spend the rest of his naval career. While serving with the fleet he rose from the post of chief of staff of the 82nd brigade of reserve ships, through two years in command of the 175th missile ship brigade, to become the fleet's First Deputy Chief of Staff in summer 1984. He undertook several long-range voyages with the 10th Operational Squadron, where he had served as the squadron's chief of staff and deputy commander between June 1975 and 1984. The squadron at this time was one of the most powerful in the navy, consisting of some of its most modern ships. In 1985 he was promoted to the rank of vice admiral, and retired in 1991.

== Political career and later life ==
Shortly before retiring from the navy, Martynyuk began a career in politics in the Russian Far East. He was elected a deputy of Vladivostok City Council for the 149th constituency in 1990, and served until 1993. He was elected chairman for the defence commission, and was a member of the Presidium of the Council between 1990 and 1992. Over the course of his life he was awarded the Order of the Red Star, and the Order "For Service to the Homeland in the Armed Forces of the USSR" Third Class, and various medals. In retirement he settled on a farm in the village of Novonezhino.

Martynyuk died in Vladivostok on 10 April 2021 at the age of 86, after a serious illness. He was buried in the city's Maritime Cemetery.
