= Soviet destroyer Derzky =

Derzky (Russian: Дерзкий), also transliterated as Derzkiy, is the name of the following ships of the Soviet Navy:

- Soviet destroyer Derzky (1944), ex-USS Crowninshield and ex-HMS Chelsea, transferred as a war reparation, returned to the Royal Navy in 1949 and scrapped
- Soviet destroyer Derzky (1960), a Kanin-class destroyer in service 1961–1990

== See also ==
- Russian destroyer Derzky, lead Derzky-class destroyer launched in 1914, scrapped in the early 1930s
- Russian corvette Derzky, lead Derzky-class corvette launched in 2021
