= Soviet destroyer Boyky (1959) =

Kanin-class destroyer

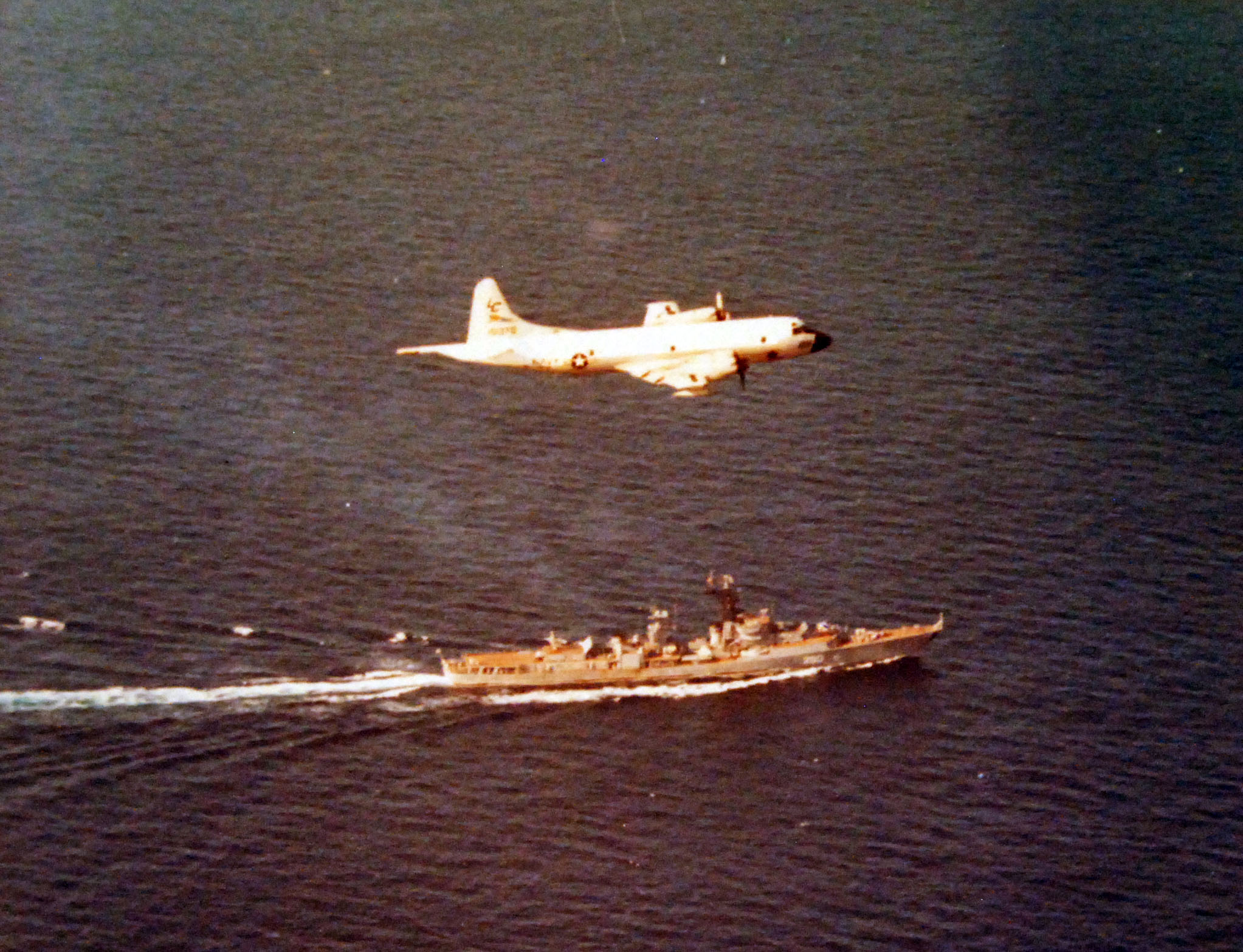
- Boyky shadowed by US Navy P-3A Orion while en-route to Boston on 10 May 1975

History

Soviet Union
- Name: Boyky; (Бойкий)
- Namesake: Jaunty in Russian
- Builder: North Nikolayev Shipyard
- Laid down: 2 April 1959
- Launched: 15 December 1959
- Commissioned: 26 June 1961
- Decommissioned: 9 February 1988
- Home port: Sevastopol
- Fate: Scrapped, 1988

General characteristics
- Class & type: Kanin-class destroyer
- Displacement: as built: 3,500 long tons (3,556 t) standard; 4,192 long tons (4,259 t) full load; as modernised: 3,700 long tons (3,759 t) standard; 4,500 long tons (4,572 t) full load
- Length: 126.1 m (414 ft)
- Beam: 12.7 m (42 ft)
- Draught: 4.2 m (14 ft)
- Installed power: 72,000 hp (54,000 kW)
- Propulsion: 2 × shaft geared steam turbines; 4 × boilers
- Speed: as built 34.5 knots (63.9 km/h; 39.7 mph)
- Complement: 320
- Sensors & processing systems: Radar: Angara/Head Net air-search radar; Zalp-Shch missile director; Neptun surface-search radar; Sonar: Pegas-2, replaced by Titan-2
- Armament: as built: 2 × SS-N-1 launchers (12 Missiles); 4 × quad 57 mm (2.2 in) guns; 2 × triple 533 mm (21 in) Torpedo tubes; 2 × RBU-2500 anti submarine rocket launchers; as modernised: 1 × twin SA-N-1 SAM launcher (32 Missiles); 2 × quad 57 mm (2.2 in) guns; 2 × twin 30 mm (1.2 in) AK-230 guns; 10 × 533 mm (21 in) torpedo tubes; 3 × RBU-6000 anti submarine rocket launchers
- Aviation facilities: Helipad

Boyky was the seventh ship of the Kanin-class destroyer of the Soviet Navy.

== Construction and career ==
The ship was built at North Nikolayev Shipyard in Mykolaiv and was launched on 14 October 1959 and commissioned into the Black Sea Fleet on 3 December 1959.

On October 14, 1961, the ship entered the Black Sea Fleet of the Soviet Navy. May 19, 1966 she was reclassified into a large missile ship (BRK). In the period from 6 to 11 August 1966, she paid a visit to Alexandria (Egypt). From 15 to 20 February 1969 was in Conakry (Guinea), and from 5 to 10 October – in Lagos (Nigeria).

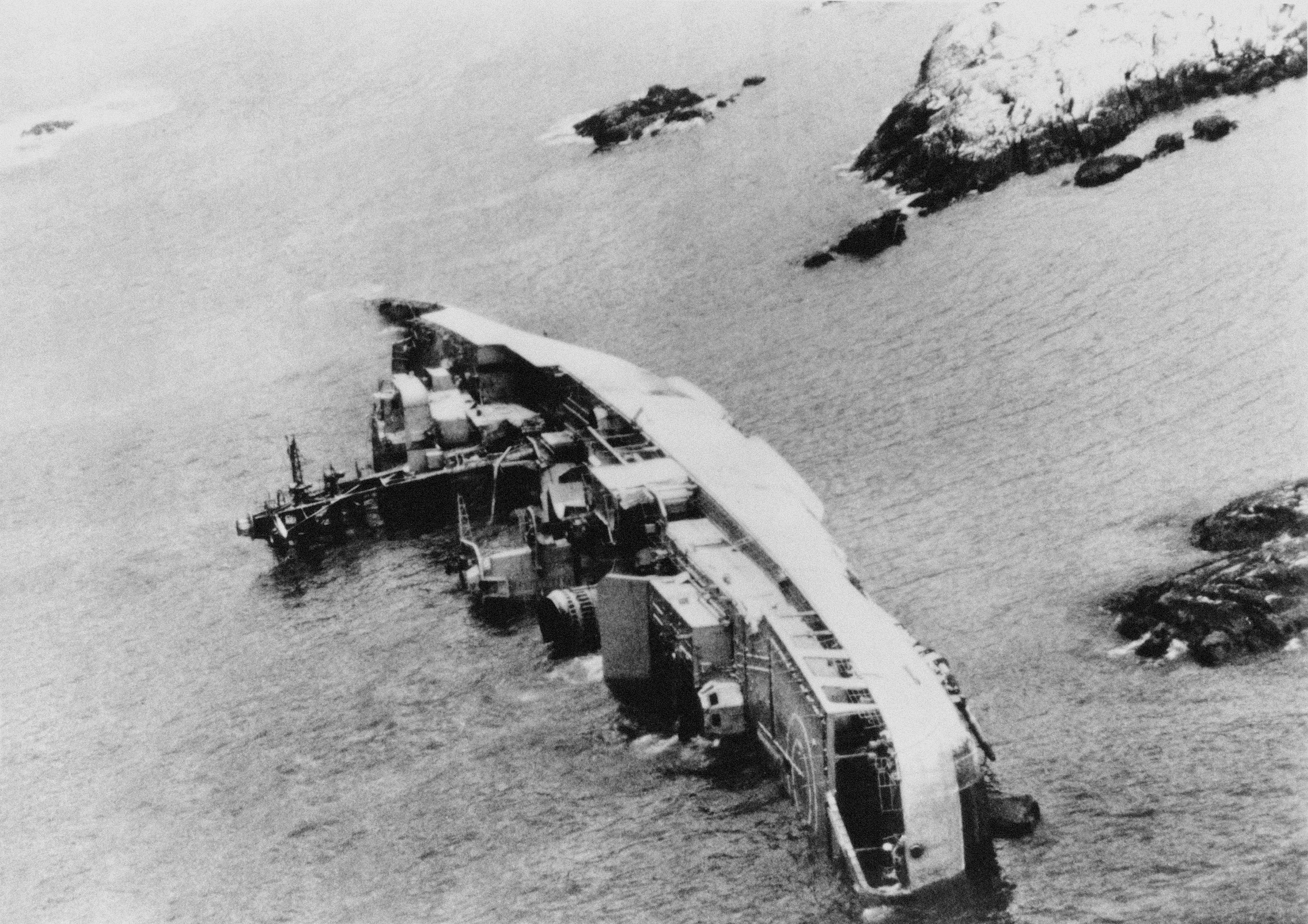
Former Boyky foundered in Skogsøya Island, c. 1988

On June 8, 1970, the destroyer was transferred to the Red Banner Northern Fleet. In the period from October 23, 1970, to April 6, 1973, she was modernized and rebuilt according to the Project 57-A at the Shipyard named after 61 Communards in Mykolaiv. November 2, 1972 transferred from the subclass of large missile ships to the subclass of large anti-submarine ships.

In May 1975, she visited Boston along with sister ship Zhguchy to celebrate the 30th anniversary of the end of World War II in Europe, marking the first visit to the United States by Soviet warships since the end of that conflict.

On February 9, 1988, the destroyer was excluded from the Soviet Navy in connection with the delivery to the OFI for disarmament, dismantling and sale. On July 17, 1988, the Boyky's crew was disbanded. In the fall of 1988, the ship was sold to a Spanish company for cutting into metal, but on the way from the Kola Bay to Ferrol on November 14, 1988, in a strong storm, she was thrown onto the coastal rocks off Skogsøya Island in the Norwegian Sea.
