= Soviet destroyer Zorky =

Kanin-class destroyer

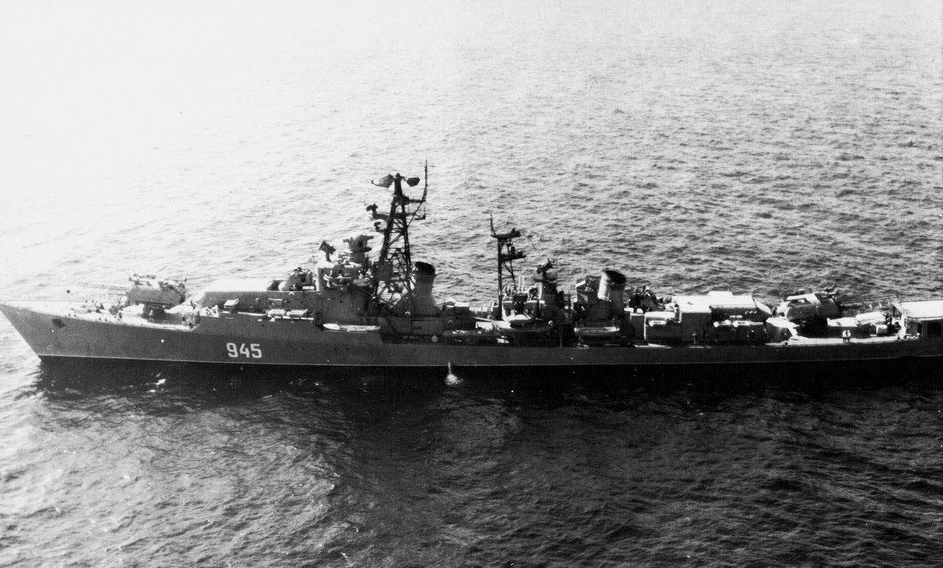
- Zorky underway in 1967

History

Soviet Union → Russia
- Name: Zorky; (Зоркий)
- Namesake: Vigilant in Russian
- Builder: Zhdanov Shipyard
- Laid down: 17 April 1959
- Launched: 30 April 1960
- Commissioned: 30 September 1961
- Decommissioned: 30 June 1993
- Home port: Kaliningrad
- Identification: See Pennant numbers
- Fate: Scrapped, 1995

General characteristics
- Class & type: Kanin-class destroyer
- Displacement: as built: 3,500 long tons (3,556 t) standard; 4,192 long tons (4,259 t) full load; as modernised: 3,700 long tons (3,759 t) standard; 4,500 long tons (4,572 t) full load
- Length: 126.1 m (414 ft)
- Beam: 12.7 m (42 ft)
- Draught: 4.2 m (14 ft)
- Installed power: 72,000 hp (54,000 kW)
- Propulsion: 2 × shaft geared steam turbines; 4 × boilers
- Speed: as built 34.5 knots (63.9 km/h; 39.7 mph)
- Complement: 320
- Sensors & processing systems: Radar: Angara/Head Net air-search radar; Zalp-Shch missile director; Neptun surface-search radar; Sonar: Pegas-2, replaced by Titan-2
- Armament: as built: 2 × SS-N-1 launchers (12 Missiles); 4 × quad 57 mm (2.2 in) guns; 2 × triple 533 mm (21 in) Torpedo tubes; 2 × RBU-2500 anti submarine rocket launchers; as modernised: 1 × twin SA-N-1 SAM launcher (32 Missiles); 2 × quad 57 mm (2.2 in) guns; 2 × twin 30 mm (1.2 in) AK-230 guns; 10 × 533 mm (21 in) torpedo tubes; 3 × RBU-6000 anti submarine rocket launchers
- Aviation facilities: Helipad

Zorky was the third ship of the Kanin-class destroyer of the Soviet Navy.

== Construction and career ==
The ship was built at Zhdanov Shipyard in Leningrad and was launched on 14 October 1959 and commissioned into the Northern Fleet on 23 December 1960.

On October 14, 1961, the ship entered the Baltic Fleet of the Soviet Navy. In 1966, she won the prize of the Commander-in-Chief of the Navy for missile training (as part of the IBM). May 19, 1966 reclassified into a large rocket ship (BRK).

In the period from May 29, 1969, to December 31, 1971, she was modernized and rebuilt according to the Project 57-A. On October 27, 1971, it was reclassified as a large anti-submarine ship (BOD).

Between December 1972 and February 1973, the ship made a trip to Cuba.

From 12 to 17 November 1974, she paid a visit to Oslo (Norway). In the period from 12 to 17 April 1979, the ship visited Bissau (Guinea-Bissau). In the period from February 10, 1984, to February 17, 1987, she underwent a major overhaul at the shipyard No. 35 in Murmansk.

On June 1, 1992, the large anti-submarine ship was reclassified into a patrol ship. On June 30, 1993, she was decommissioned by the Russian Navy in connection with delivery to ARVI for disarmament, dismantling and sale. On December 31, the ship's crew was disbanded. On July 18, 1995, the ship's hull was sold to an American firm for cutting into metal in United States.

=== Pennant numbers ===
Date	Pennant number
1961	267
	261
	036
	237
	900
	964
1964	185
1967	945
	554
1975	553
	251
1977	253
1979	546
	888
