= Soviet destroyer Gnevny =

Gnevny is the name of the following ships of the Soviet Navy:

- Soviet destroyer Gnevny (1936), lead Gnevny-class destroyer, sunk by aircraft in 1941
- Soviet destroyer Gnevny (1958), a Kanin-class destroyer, in commission 1960–1988

== See also ==
- Russian destroyer Gnevny, a Derzky-class destroyer launched in 1913
