= Soviet destroyer Uporny =

Kanin-class destroyer

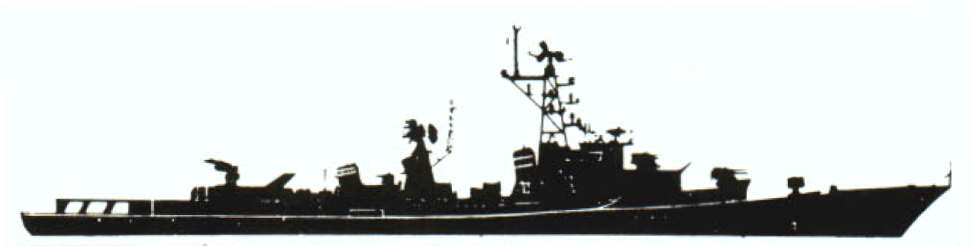
- Profile drawing of Kanin-class destroyer

History

Soviet Union → Russia
- Name: Uporny; (Упорный)
- Namesake: Persistent in Russian
- Builder: North Nikolayev Shipyard
- Laid down: 21 September 1958
- Launched: 14 October 1959
- Commissioned: 3 December 1960
- Decommissioned: 29 June 1993
- Renamed: PKZ-12
- Home port: Vladivostok
- Fate: Scrapped, 1995

General characteristics
- Class & type: Kanin-class destroyer
- Displacement: as built: 3,500 long tons (3,556 t) standard; 4,192 long tons (4,259 t) full load; as modernised: 3,700 long tons (3,759 t) standard; 4,500 long tons (4,572 t) full load
- Length: 126.1 m (414 ft)
- Beam: 12.7 m (42 ft)
- Draught: 4.2 m (14 ft)
- Installed power: 72,000 hp (54,000 kW)
- Propulsion: 2 × shaft geared steam turbines; 4 × boilers
- Speed: as built 34.5 knots (63.9 km/h; 39.7 mph)
- Complement: 320
- Sensors & processing systems: Radar: Angara/Head Net air-search radar; Zalp-Shch missile director; Neptun surface-search radar; Sonar: Pegas-2, replaced by Titan-2
- Armament: as built: 2 × SS-N-1 launchers (12 Missiles); 4 × quad 57 mm (2.2 in) guns; 2 × triple 533 mm (21 in) Torpedo tubes; 2 × RBU-2500 anti submarine rocket launchers; as modernised: 1 × twin SA-N-1 SAM launcher (32 Missiles); 2 × quad 57 mm (2.2 in) guns; 2 × twin 30 mm (1.2 in) AK-230 guns; 10 × 533 mm (21 in) torpedo tubes; 3 × RBU-6000 anti submarine rocket launchers
- Aviation facilities: Helipad

Uporny was the sixth ship of the Kanin-class destroyer of the Soviet Navy.

== Construction and career ==
The ship was built at North Nikolayev Shipyard in Mykolaiv and was launched on 14 October 1959 and commissioned into the Black Sea Fleet on 3 December 1960.

In June 1961, after an inter-fleet passage from Sevastopol along the Northern Sea Route to Vladivostok, it became part of the Pacific Fleet of the Soviet Navy. On 19 May 1966, she was reclassified into a large missile ship (BRK). In the period from 26 December 1967 to 22 March 1968, she underwent a major overhaul at Dalzavod Shipyard (Vladivostok).

In 1969, the destroyer carried out combat service in the Indian Ocean, during this period made business calls to Zanzibar (Tanzania), Malé (Maldives), Umm Qasr (Iraq), Bandar Abbas (Iran) and Berber (Somalia). From April 25, 1970, to August 19, 1970, he took part in an exercise and carried out combat service in the Indian Ocean, made business calls to Berbera, Mogadishu, Umm Qasr, Bombay. August - October 1972 - military service in the Pacific Ocean, in the regions of Canada, North America and Hawaii. From 7 February 1977 to 3 February 1978, she was modernized and rebuilt at Dalzavod according to the project 57-A. August 3, 1977 reclassified as large anti-submarine ships.

On June 24, 1991, the destroyer was excluded from the combat composition of the Soviet Navy, disarmed and renamed to the PKZ-12 after conversion into a floating barrack. On June 29, 1993, the floating barracks were excluded from the lists of the Navy ships in connection with the delivery to ARVI for dismantling and sale.

On September 7, 1995, PKZ-12 was sold to an American company for cutting into metal.
