= Soviet destroyer Zhguchy =

Zhguchy, also spelled Zhguchiy, is the name of the following ships of the Soviet Navy:

- Soviet destroyer Zhguchy (1944), ex-USS Twiggs (DD-127) and ex-HMS Leamington (G19), returned to the UK in 1950 and scrapped in 1951
- Soviet destroyer Zhguchy (1959), a Kanin-class destroyer in service 1960–1987
