= Soviet destroyer Boyky =

Boyky (Russian: Бойкий), also spelled Boykiy or Boikiy, is the name of the following ships of the Soviet Navy:

- Soviet destroyer Boyky (1936), a Gnevny-class destroyer that served during World War II, sunk as target in 1962
- Soviet destroyer Boyky (1959), a Kanin-class destroyer in commission 1961–1988

== See also ==
- Russian corvette Boikiy, a Steregushchiy-class corvette commissioned in 2013
