= Russian ship Tsesarevich =

At least three ships of the Imperial Russian Navy have been named Tsesarevich after the Tsesarevich, the title of the male heir apparent.

- Russian ship of the line Tsesarevich (1841) – 44-gun Speshnyi-class frigate that served with the Baltic Fleet; participated in the Crimean War and was hulked in 1858.
- Russian ship of the line Tsesarevich (1857) – 135-gun steam-powered ship of the line that served with the Baltic Fleet; stricken in 1871.
- Russian battleship Tsesarevich – pre-dreadnought battleship that participated in the Russo-Japanese War and World War I before she was scrapped in 1923–24.
