= Soviet destroyer Gordy (1960) =

Kanin-class destroyer

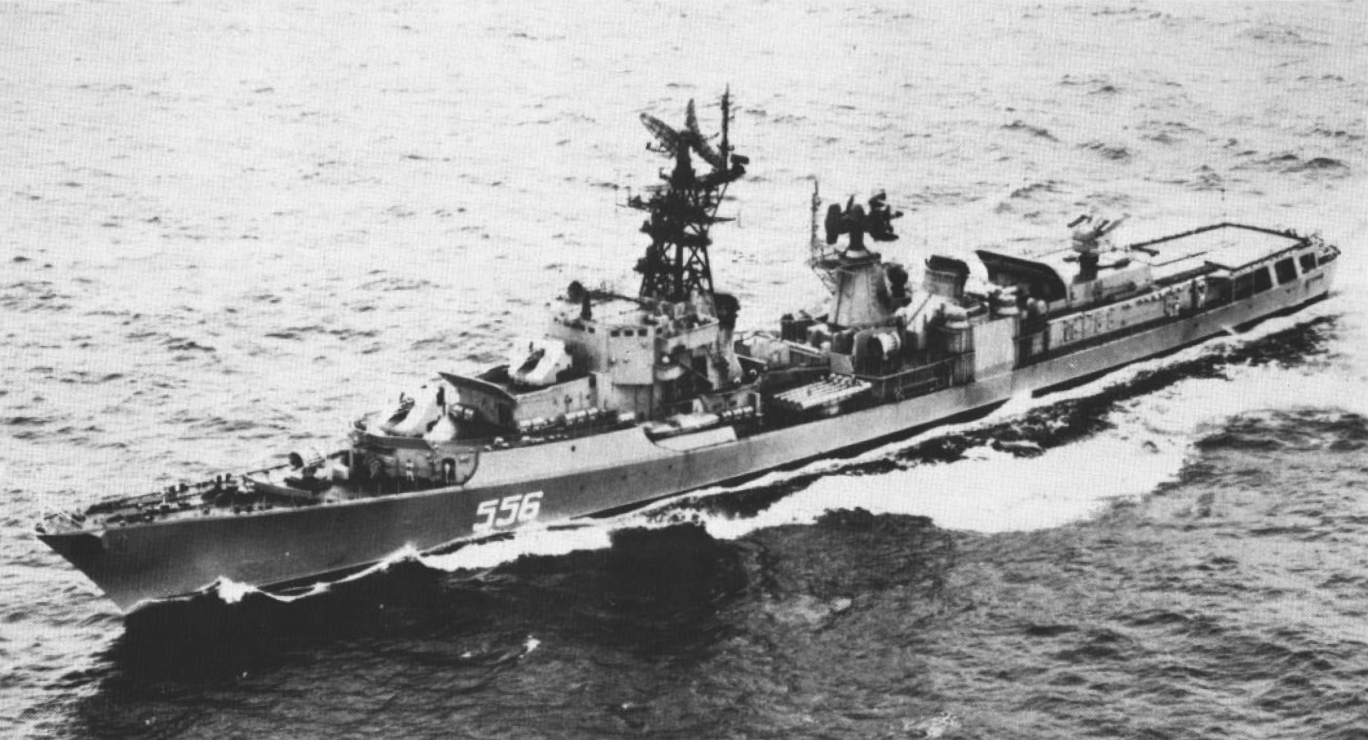
- Gordy underway c. 1980

History

Soviet Union
- Name: Gordy; (Гордый)
- Namesake: Proud in Russian
- Builder: Amur Shipbuilding Plant
- Laid down: May 1959
- Launched: 24 May 1960
- Commissioned: 6 February 1961
- Decommissioned: 30 July 1987
- Home port: Vladivostok
- Fate: Sunk as target, 1988

General characteristics
- Class & type: Kanin-class destroyer
- Displacement: as built: 3,500 long tons (3,556 t) standard; 4,192 long tons (4,259 t) full load; as modernised: 3,700 long tons (3,759 t) standard; 4,500 long tons (4,572 t) full load
- Length: 126.1 m (414 ft)
- Beam: 12.7 m (42 ft)
- Draught: 4.2 m (14 ft)
- Installed power: 72,000 hp (54,000 kW)
- Propulsion: 2 × shaft geared steam turbines; 4 × boilers
- Speed: as built 34.5 knots (63.9 km/h; 39.7 mph)
- Complement: 320
- Sensors & processing systems: Radar: Angara/Head Net air-search radar; Zalp-Shch missile director; Neptun surface-search radar; Sonar: Pegas-2, replaced by Titan-2
- Armament: as built: 2 × SS-N-1 launchers (12 Missiles); 4 × quad 57 mm (2.2 in) guns; 2 × triple 533 mm (21 in) Torpedo tubes; 2 × RBU-2500 anti submarine rocket launchers; as modernised: 1 × twin SA-N-1 SAM launcher (32 Missiles); 2 × quad 57 mm (2.2 in) guns; 2 × twin 30 mm (1.2 in) AK-230 guns; 10 × 533 mm (21 in) torpedo tubes; 3 × RBU-6000 anti submarine rocket launchers
- Aviation facilities: Helipad

Gordy was the eighth ship of the Kanin-class destroyer of the Soviet Navy.

== Construction and career ==
The ship was built at Amur Shipbuilding Plant in Komsomolsk-on-Amur and was launched on 24 May 1960 and commissioned into the Pacific Fleet on 30 July 1987.

On November 15, 1961, the ship entered the Pacific Fleet of the Soviet Navy. On May 19, 1966, the ship was reclassified into a large missile ship (BRK). In 1967, the ship missile battalion was opposed to an American squadron led by the aircraft carrier USS Enterprise, which entered Soviet territorial waters. With the advent of Soviet fighters, the American squadron went into neutral waters. In the period from 28 to 31 March 1968, she paid a business visit to Madras and from 3 to 6 April - to Bombay (India).

From 1973 to 1975, she was modernized and rebuilt at Dalzavod according to Project 57-A. On June 20, 1975, reclassified as large anti-submarine ships.

On July 30, 1987, the destroyer was excluded from the combat strength of the Soviet Navy in connection with the delivery to the OFI for disarmament, dismantling and sale. On August 9, 1987, the ship's crew was disbanded. Subsequently, the ship's hull was used as a target ship and sunk in the Bering Sea off the coast of Kamchatka during rocket firing.

== Gallery ==
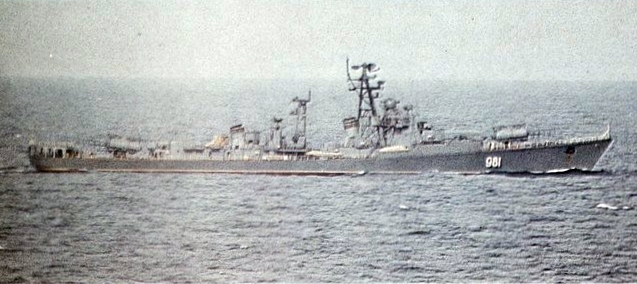
Gordy in 1968

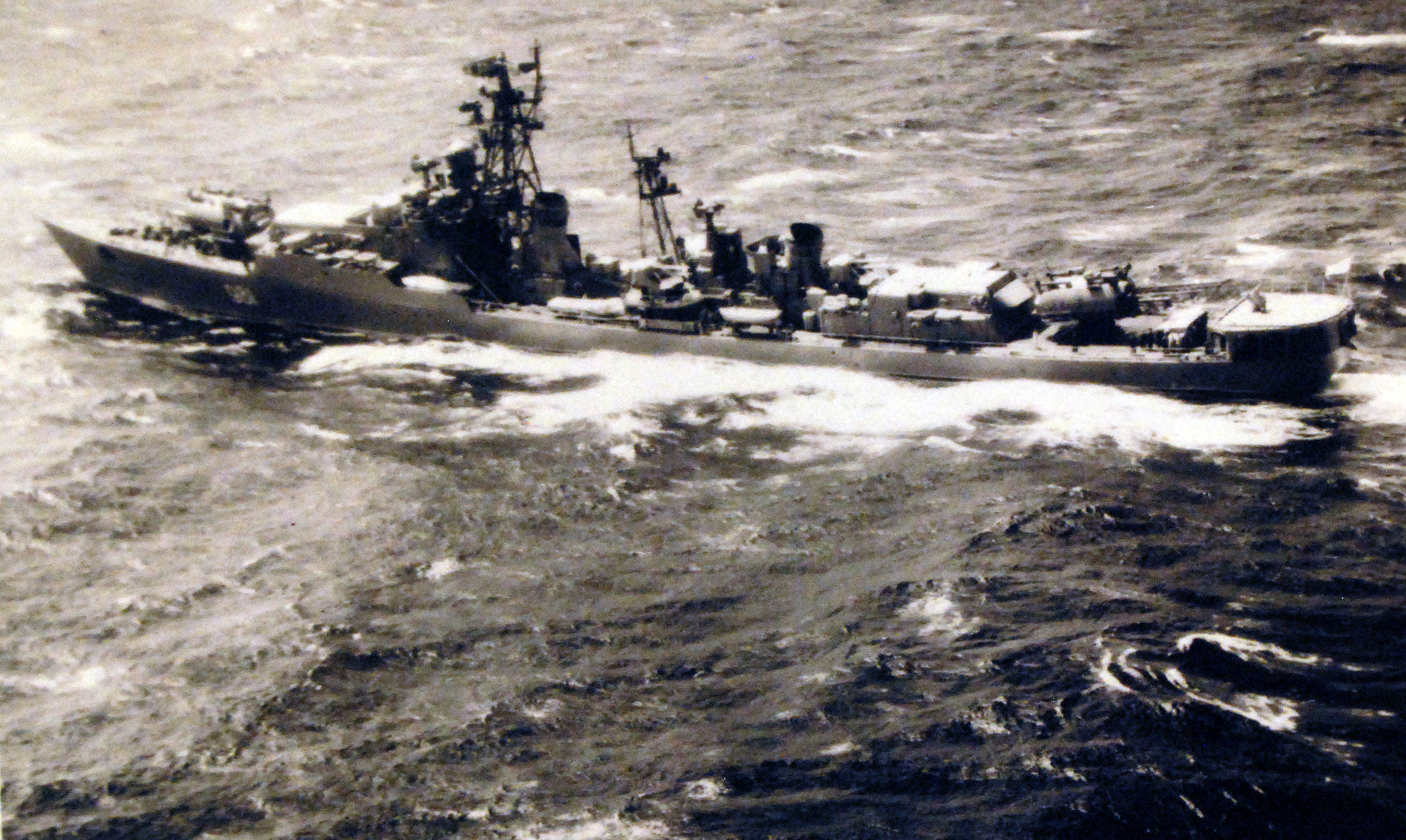
Gordyy in November 1970
