= Soviet destroyer Gnevny (1958) =

Kanin-class destroyer

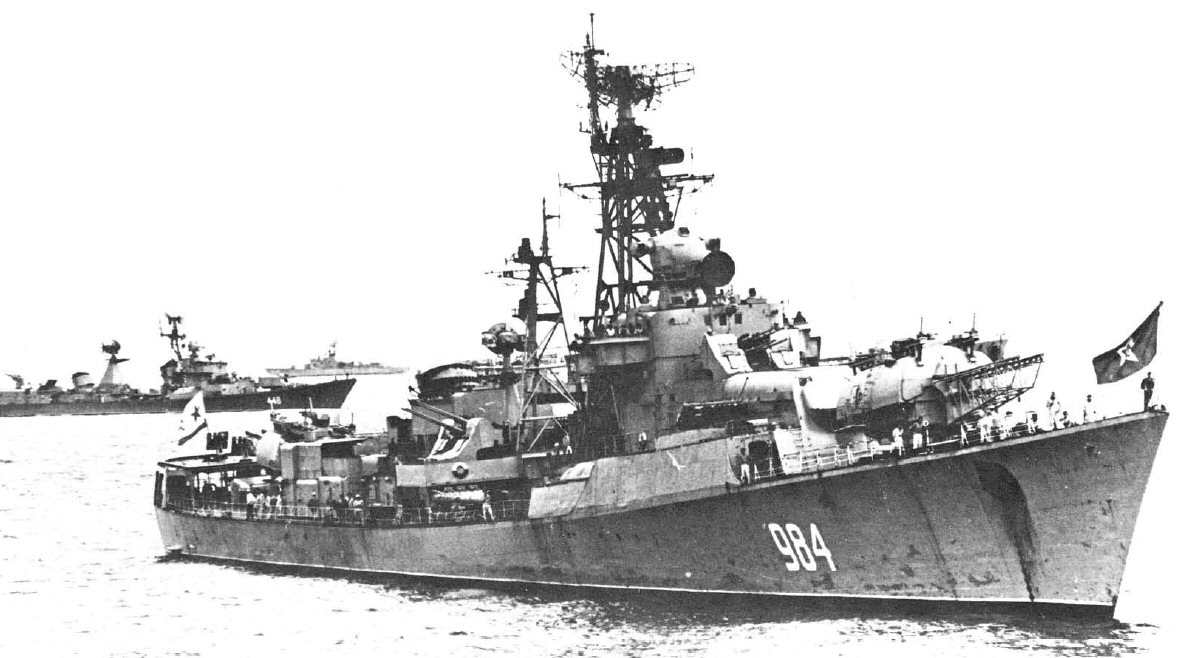
- Gnevny in 1971

History

Soviet Union
- Name: Gnevny; (Гневный)
- Namesake: Wrathful in Russian
- Builder: North Nikolayev Shipyard
- Laid down: 16 November 1957
- Launched: 30 November 1958
- Commissioned: 10 January 1960
- Decommissioned: 8 April 1988
- Home port: Vladivostok
- Fate: Scrapped

General characteristics
- Class & type: Kanin-class destroyer
- Displacement: as built: 3,500 long tons (3,556 t) standard; 4,192 long tons (4,259 t) full load; as modernised: 3,700 long tons (3,759 t) standard; 4,500 long tons (4,572 t) full load
- Length: 126.1 m (414 ft)
- Beam: 12.7 m (42 ft)
- Draught: 4.2 m (14 ft)
- Installed power: 72,000 hp (54,000 kW)
- Propulsion: 2 × shaft geared steam turbines; 4 × boilers
- Speed: as built 34.5 knots (63.9 km/h; 39.7 mph)
- Complement: 320
- Sensors & processing systems: Radar: Angara/Head Net air-search radar; Zalp-Shch missile director; Neptun surface-search radar; Sonar: Pegas-2, replaced by Titan-2
- Armament: as built: 2 × SS-N-1 launchers (12 Missiles); 4 × quad 57 mm (2.2 in) guns; 2 × triple 533 mm (21 in) Torpedo tubes; 2 × RBU-2500 anti submarine rocket launchers; as modernised: 1 × twin SA-N-1 SAM launcher (32 Missiles); 2 × quad 57 mm (2.2 in) guns; 2 × twin 30 mm (1.2 in) AK-230 guns; 10 × 533 mm (21 in) torpedo tubes; 3 × RBU-6000 anti submarine rocket launchers
- Aviation facilities: Helipad

Gnevny was the fifth ship of the Kanin-class destroyer of the Soviet Navy.

== Construction and career ==
The ship was built at North Nikolayev Shipyard in Mykolaiv and was launched on 30 November 1958 and commissioned into the Black Sea Fleet on 10 January 1960.

In 1961, the ship made an ultra-long-distance transition from the Black Sea around Europe, and then — via the Northern Sea Route to the base of the Pacific Fleet.

On May 19, 1966, all ships of Project 57-bis including Gnevny were reclassified as a Large Missile Ship (BRK, Большой Ракетный Корабль).

She visited Massawa, Ethiopia twice (January 1967 and 1969), Casablanca, Morocco (October 1968 and April 1972), as well as Aden, South Yemen (January 1969), Mauritius (April 1969), Bombay, India (November 1975), and Vancouver, Canada (August 1976).

During the Six-Day War, in June 1967 and April-December 1968, she performed combat missions to provide assistance to the armed forces of Egypt and Syria.

On March 13, 1969, she was transferred to the Pacific Fleet. In the period from 1972 to 1973, it was modernized according to the project 57-A in Vladivostok at the Dalzavod shipyard. On March 7, 1974, the ship was reclassified as a large anti-submarine ship (BPK, Большой Противолодочные Корабль).

On April 8, 1988, the ship was decommissioned and removed from the naval register, in connection with the transfer to the OFI for dismantling and sale, and on July 17 of the same year her crew was disbanded.

== Gallery ==
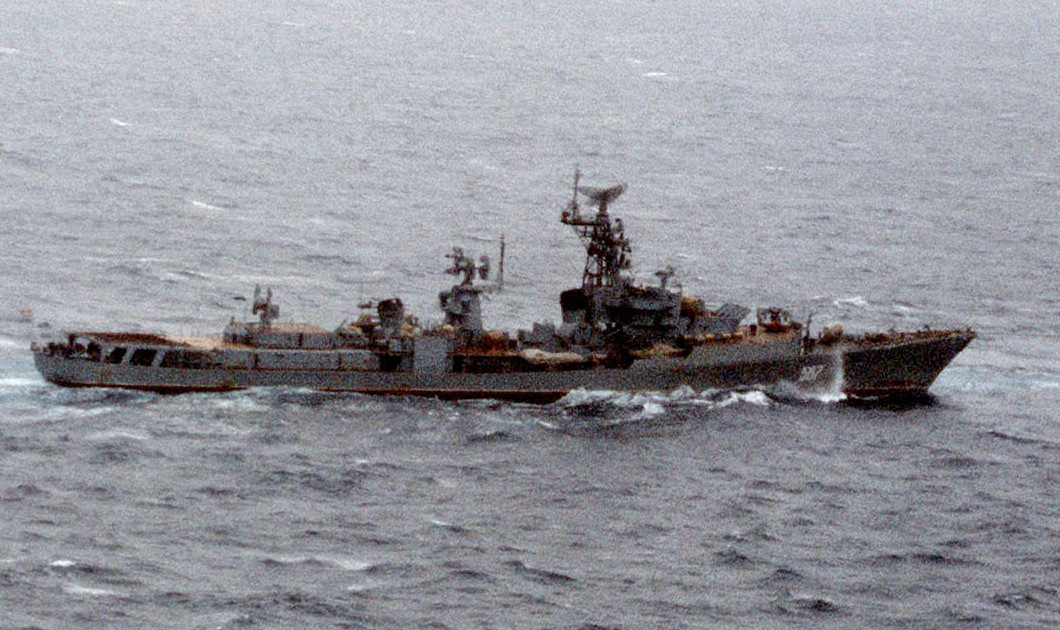
Gnevny in 1983

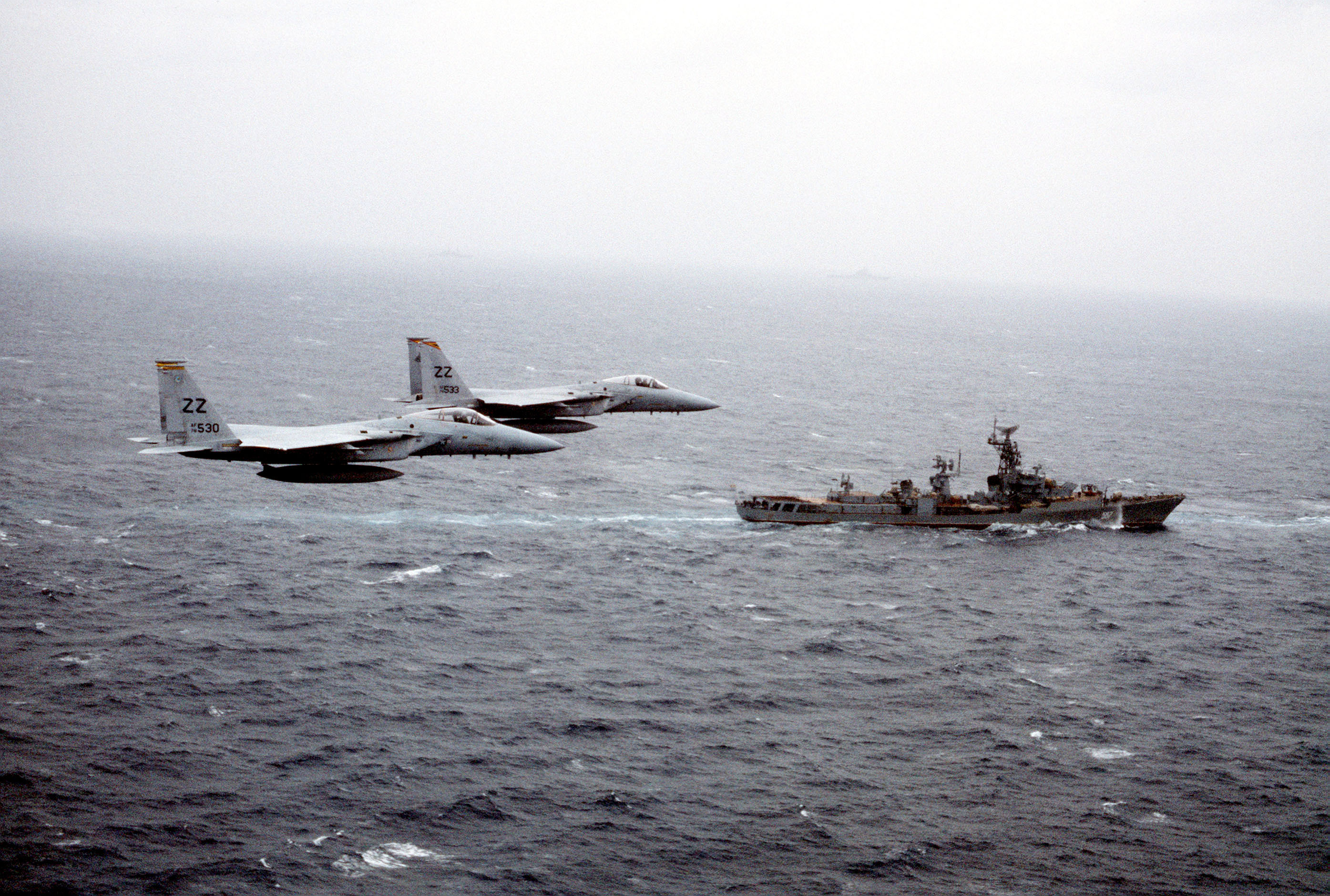

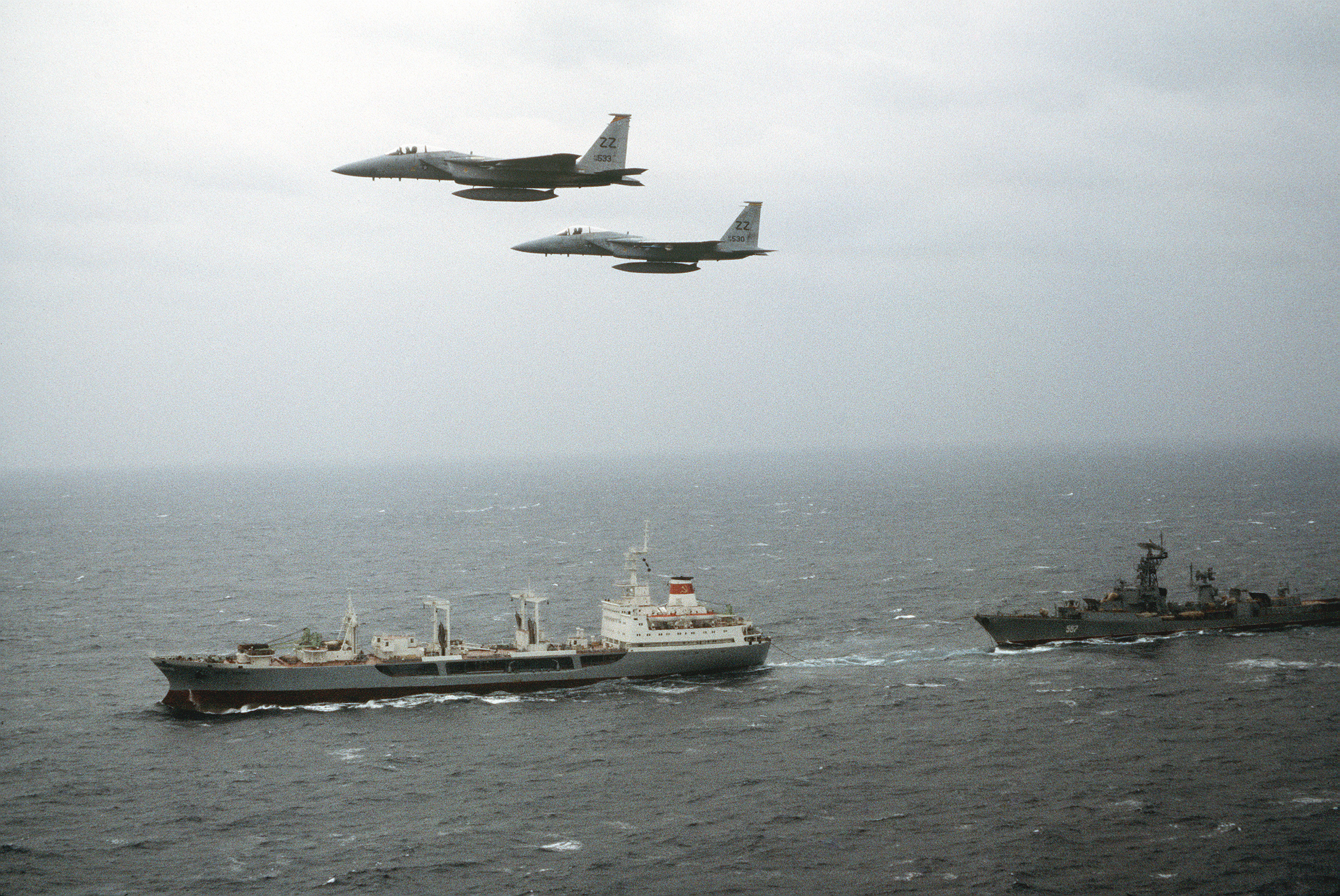
