= Soviet destroyer Derzky (1960) =

Kanin-class destroyer

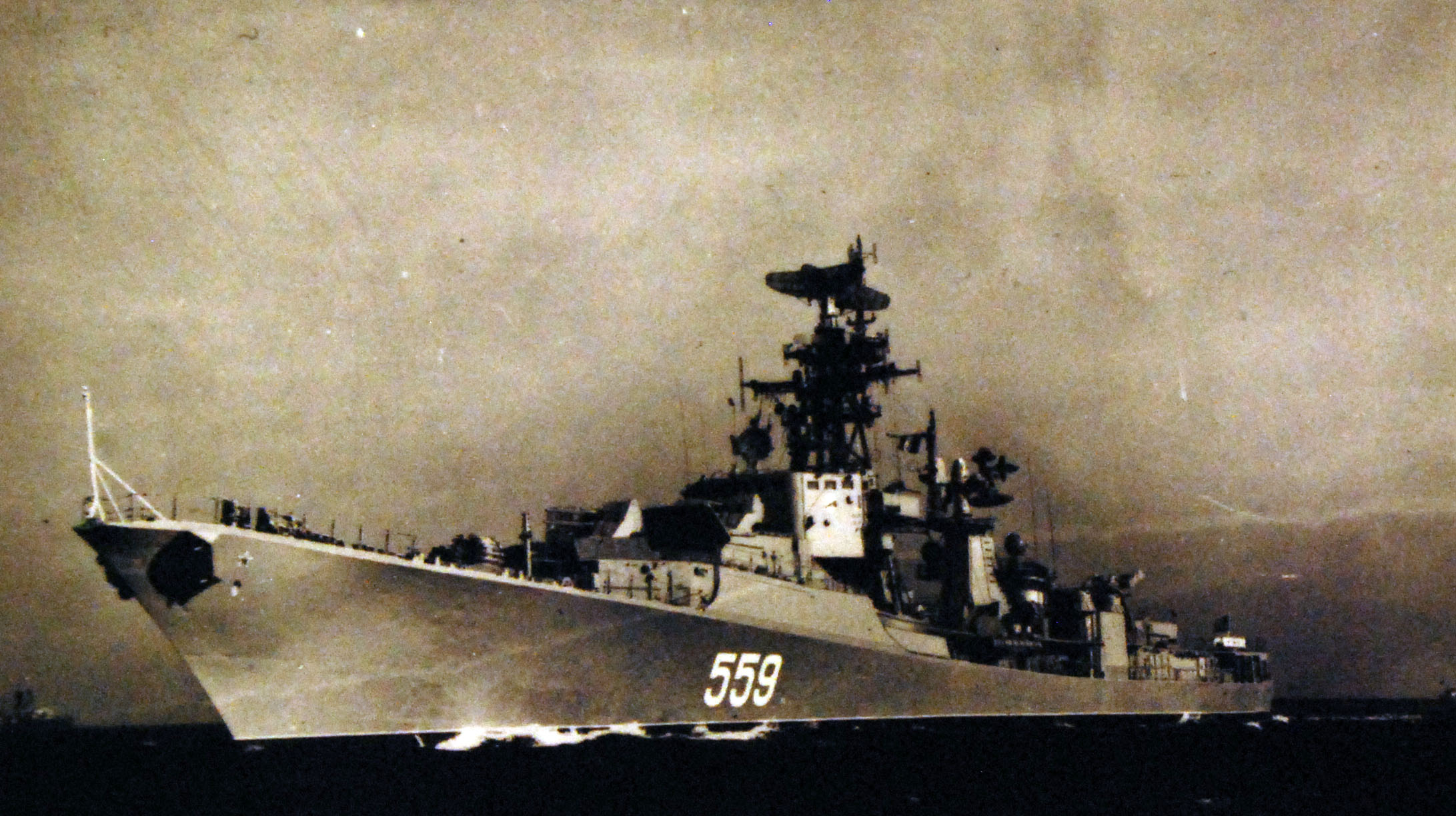
- Derzky in 1976

History

Soviet Union
- Name: Derzky; (Дерзкий)
- Namesake: Bold in Russian
- Builder: Zhdanov Shipyard
- Laid down: 10 October 1959
- Launched: 4 February 1960
- Commissioned: 30 December 1961
- Decommissioned: 19 April 1990
- Home port: Severomorsk
- Fate: Sunk as target

General characteristics
- Class & type: Kanin-class destroyer
- Displacement: as built: 3,500 long tons (3,556 t) standard; 4,192 long tons (4,259 t) full load; as modernised: 3,700 long tons (3,759 t) standard; 4,500 long tons (4,572 t) full load
- Length: 126.1 m (414 ft)
- Beam: 12.7 m (42 ft)
- Draught: 4.2 m (14 ft)
- Installed power: 72,000 hp (54,000 kW)
- Propulsion: 2 × shaft geared steam turbines; 4 × boilers
- Speed: as built 34.5 knots (63.9 km/h; 39.7 mph)
- Complement: 320
- Sensors & processing systems: Radar: Angara/Head Net air-search radar; Zalp-Shch missile director; Neptun surface-search radar; Sonar: Pegas-2, replaced by Titan-2
- Armament: as built: 2 × SS-N-1 launchers (12 Missiles); 4 × quad 57 mm (2.2 in) guns; 2 × triple 533 mm (21 in) Torpedo tubes; 2 × RBU-2500 anti submarine rocket launchers; as modernised: 1 × twin SA-N-1 SAM launcher (32 Missiles); 2 × quad 57 mm (2.2 in) guns; 2 × twin 30 mm (1.2 in) AK-230 guns; 10 × 533 mm (21 in) torpedo tubes; 3 × RBU-6000 anti submarine rocket launchers
- Aviation facilities: Helipad

Derzky was the fourth ship of the Kanin-class destroyer of the Soviet Navy.

== Construction and career ==
The ship was built at Zhdanov Shipyard in Leningrad and was launched on 4 February 1960 and commissioned into the Northern Fleet on 30 December 1961.

On January 12, 1962, the ship entered the Northern Fleet of the Soviet Navy. On May 19, 1966, the Derzky was reclassified into a large missile ship (BRK).

In the period from November 20, 1967 to April 22, 1972, it was modernized and rebuilt according to Project 57-A at the shipyard named after V.I. A. A. Zhdanov. On October 20, 1970, the ship was reclassified as a large anti-submarine ship.

In the period from 4 to 9 August 1973, the ship visited Havana (Cuba). On August 7, 1977, the ship was withdrawn from the fleet, mothballed and put on hold in Sayda-Guba.

On April 19, 1990, the destroyer was excluded from the Soviet Navy in connection with the delivery to the OFI for disarmament, dismantling and sale. On October 1, 1990, the crew of the ship was disbanded, and the ship was turned into a target ship.
