= Mykolayiv Shipyard =

Shipyard in Mykolaiv, Ukraine

Coordinates: 46.9764°N 32.0042°E

Mykolaiv Shipyard

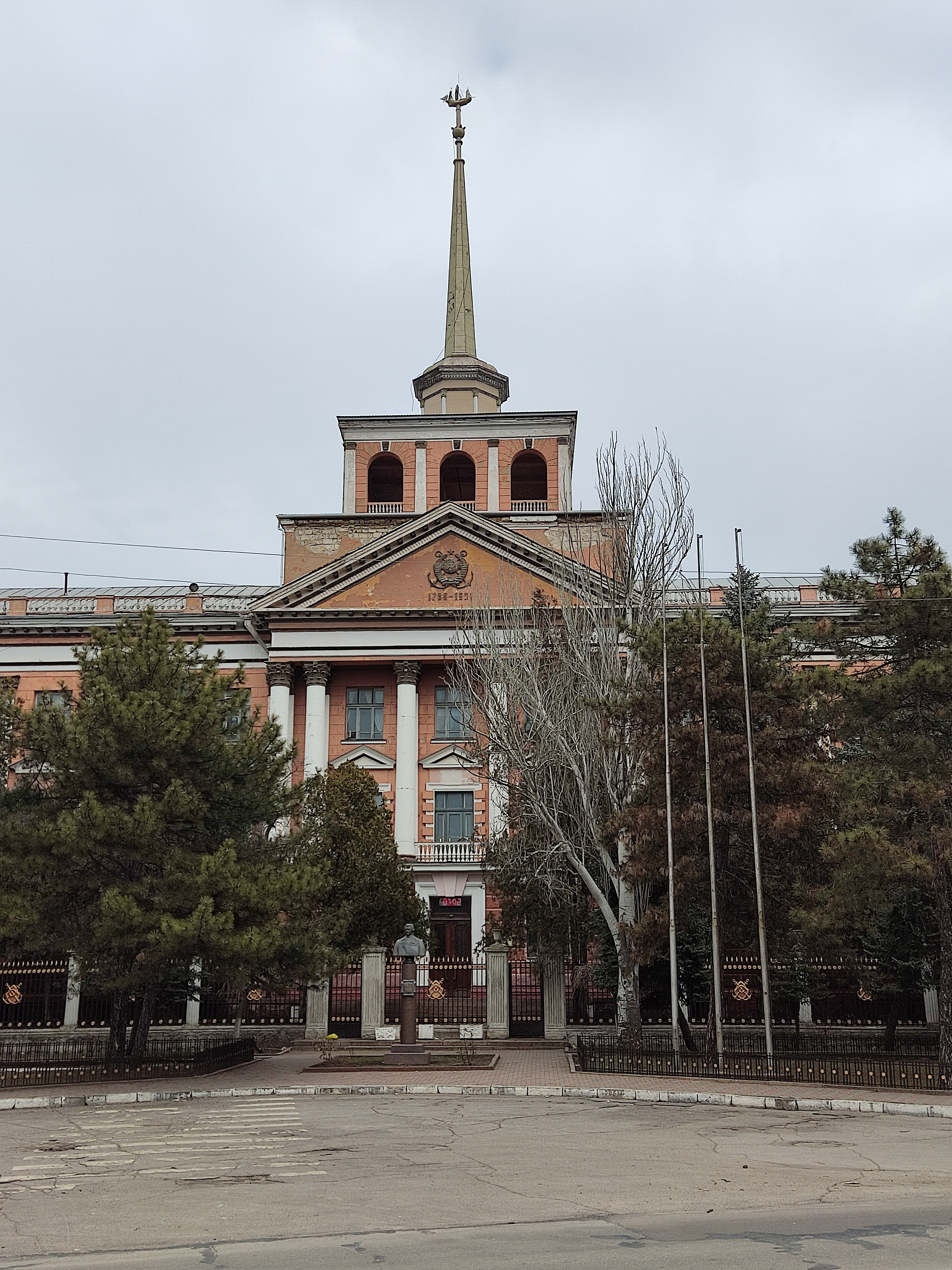
- Mykolaiv Shipyard Admiralty Building, built in the Stalinist style in 1951.
- Formerly: 61 Kommunara Shipbuilding Plant
- Type: Shipyard
- Industry: Shipbuilding
- Predecessors: Nikolaev Admiralty; Russia Shipbuilding Company - "Russud"; Andre Marti (North) Yard; Shipyard No. 200 (in the name of 61 Communards); Shipyard No. 445 (in the name of 61 Communards)
- Founded: 1788; 238 years ago in Nikolayev, Nikolayev Governorate, Russian Empire
- Founder: Prince Grigory Potemkin
- Headquarters: Mykolaiv, Ukraine
- Parent: Ukroboronprom

Mykolaiv Shipyard (Ukrainian: Миколаївський суднобудівний завод) (Russian: Николаевский судостроительный завод) was a major shipyard located in Mykolaiv, Ukraine. Originally named the Nikolayev Admiralty, and constructed in 1788 for the purpose of supplying the Russian Black Sea Fleet, the Mykolaiv Shipyard was famous for having built warships such as Vitse-admiral Popov, Knyaz' Potemkin-Tavricheskiy and Imperator Nikolai I for the Russian Empire, and Soobrazitelny, Gnevny, Nikolayev and Slava for the Soviet Union.

Until 2017, the shipyard was named as the Shipyard named after 61 Communards, a name inherited from its period as a major Soviet Navy shipyard. The shipyard has also been referred to as the Mykolaiv North Shipyard, to differentiate it from the Black Sea Shipyard present in the same city. The Mykolaiv shipyard is a subsidiary of the Ukrainian state-run defence conglomerate Ukroboronprom.

The shipyard has largely been inactive since its declaration of bankruptcy in 2020, with its facilities and offices largely derelict. Construction and maintenance for the Ukrainian Navy, as well as commercial shipping moved to the former Black Sea Shipyard, located in the south of Mykolaiv. However, as of 2021 some small scale ship maintenance and repair was still present at the shipyards.

== History ==
=== Foundation ===
The city of Nikolayev, now known as Mykolaiv, was founded by Prince Grigory Aleksandrovich Potemkin-Tauricheski on behalf of Russian empress Catherine the Great after the annexation of the Ottoman territory of Yedisan, during the Russo-Turkish War of 1768–1774. In 1788, the Nikolayev Admiralty was founded on the banks of the Ingul river approximately 89 km inland from the Black Sea. Nikolayev, as well as the neighbouring city of Kherson were founded as part of Potemkin's goals of establishing cities that would facilitate the creation of a Black Sea Fleet, a key component in developing the territory of Novorossiya as a key region of the Russian Empire. The shipyard would be named after Saint Nicholas, the patron saint of seafarers in the Russian Orthodox Church.

The first ship built by the shipyard was the fifth-rate frigate St. Nicholas, launched in 1790. St. Nicholas would see service in the Russian Black Sea Fleet, notably taking part in the Battle of Cape Kaliakra during the Russo-Turkish War (1787–1792), as well as operations during the War of the Second Coalition. The fourth-rate Grigory Velikiia Armenii, sixth-rate Legkii and second-rate Sviatoi Pavel were launched in the following years.

Between the years 1816 and 1833, over 100 warships were built at the admiralty. 1820 and 1825 saw the launching of two paddle steamers, being Vezuviy and Meteor. The latter would be the first naval steamship to be present in the Black Sea. In 1827–1829, the neighbouring Kherson Admiralty Shipyard was shut down, with its remaining assets merged into the Nikolayev Shipyard. By the middle of the 19th century, the Nikolayev Admiralty became the de facto centre of naval shipbuilding for the Russian Empire. An advantage of the shipyards was the warmer climate of the Black Sea, in comparison to others such as the Admiralty Shipyard in Saint Petersburg.

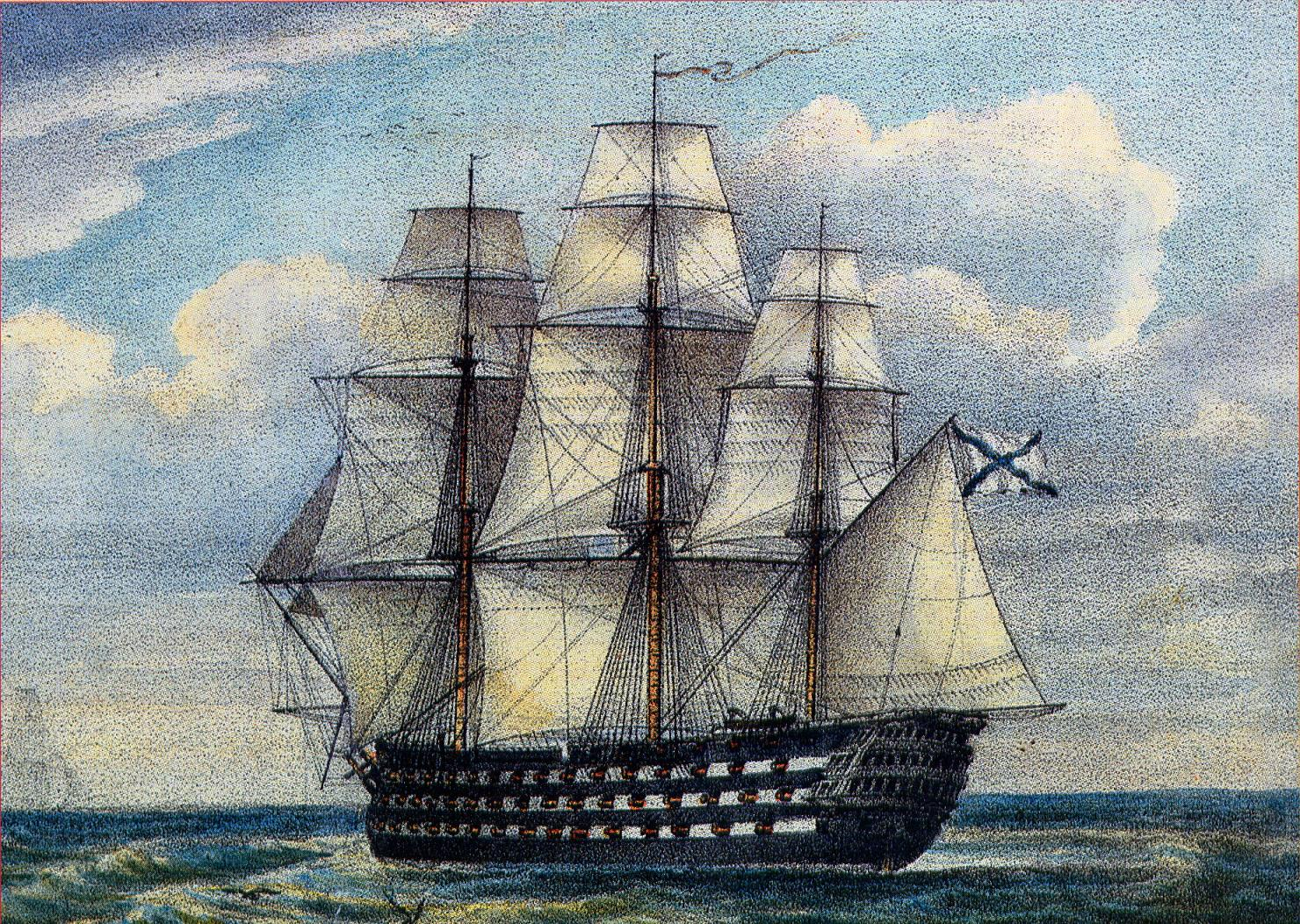
Dvenadtsat Apostolov

In 1833, Commander of the Black Sea Fleet Admiral Lazarev took command of the admiralty. At the time, the shipyard was experiencing significant growth, with the Admiral stating that "if the shipyard grows, so does the city". In 1838, work started on the first major redevelopment of the shipyard. A number of new facilities, including a rope factory, foundry, and three new slipways were built. Conditions further improved with the installation of a large movable crane.

=== Crimean War ===
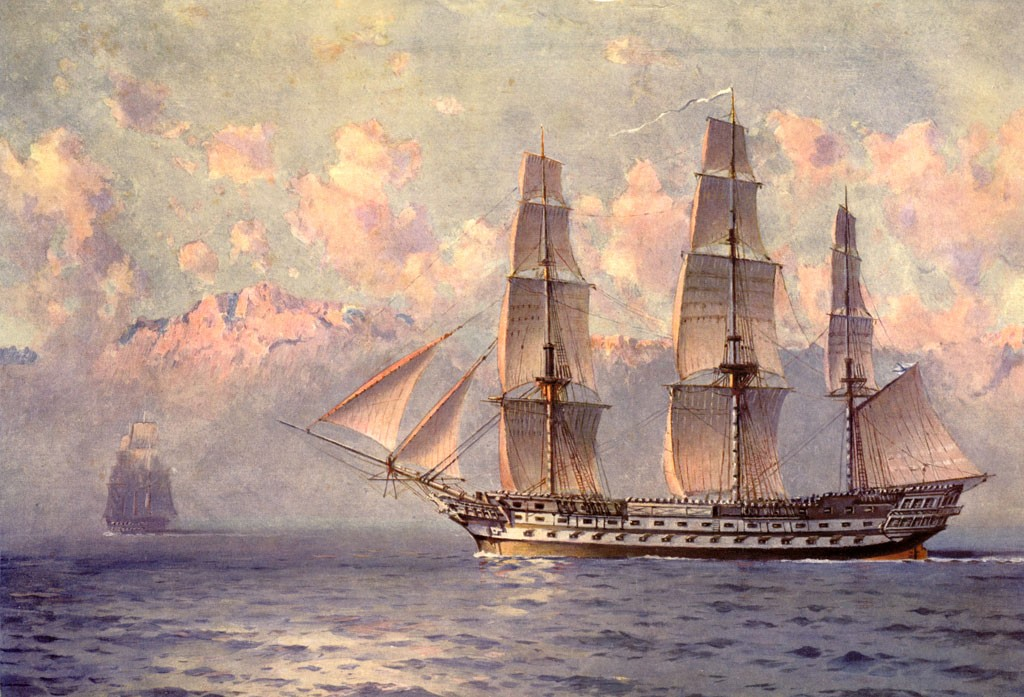
Imperatritsa Maria

During the Crimean War, Nikolayev became the administrative centre of the Black Sea Fleet, due to the Franco-British-Turkish assault on the city of Sevastopol. As a result, the shipyard dedicated all of its resources towards provisioning the Imperial Russian Navy. In addition to this, many plant workers were involved in the defence of the city itself. The war concluded with the Treaty of Paris in 1856. The terms of the treaty made the Black Sea neutral territory, closing it to Russian warships and prohibiting the development of coastal defences and fortifications. The significant shipbuilding capabilities of the shipyard were now redundant for the meager remains of the Black Sea Fleet. After the war, the first-rate ships of the line Sinop and Tsesarevich, which had been laid down prior to the start of hostilities, were launched in 1857 and 1858, only to be transferred to the Baltic Fleet. In 1857, the first ironclad ship named Inkerman was launched.

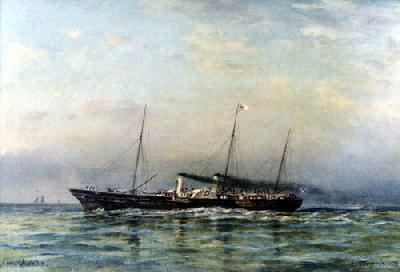
Livadia

In 1860 General admiral Konstantin Nikolayevich ordered the conversion of Tigr, a three-masted paddle steamer built in 1855–1858, into a yacht for the royal family named Livadia. Work began in the end of 1869, although officially the Livadia was laid down only in March 1870. The ship transported the royal family around the Black Sea, as well as seeing action in the Russo-Turkish War (1877–1878). Ultimately the ship ran around on the Tarkhankut Peninsula in 1878. While the crew and ships contents were successfully recovered, the ship itself would be destroyed by the harsh waves of the peninsula.

In 1861, the Admiralty instituted a 10-hour working day, beginning at 5:00 am.

=== Pre-dreadnought era ===
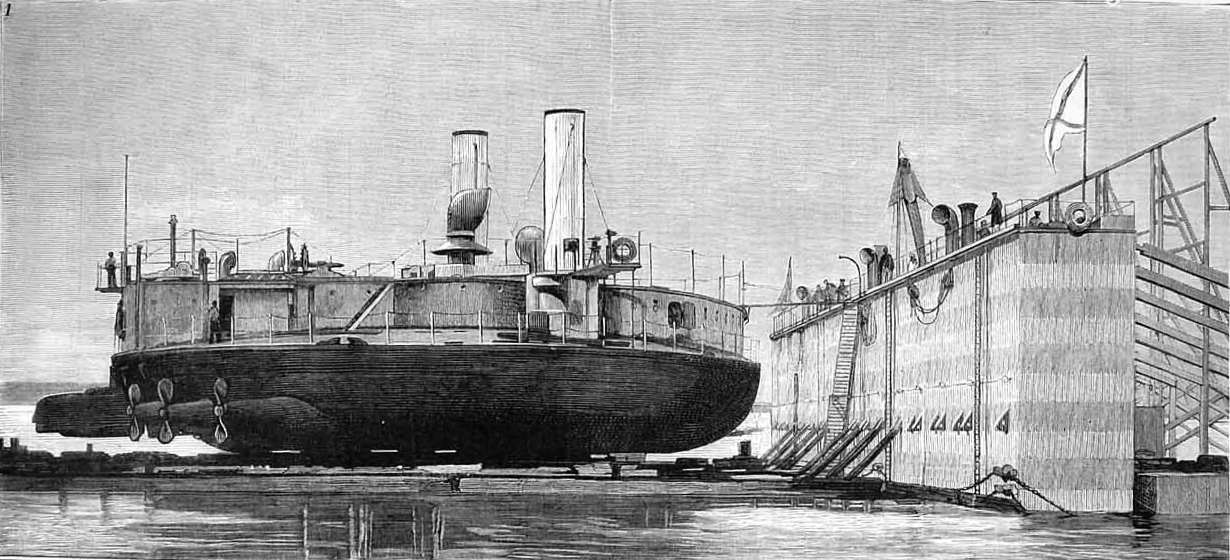
Vitse-admiral Popov

In 1871, Russia announced its refusal to comply with the restrictions imposed in her by the Treaty of Paris. As such the construction of coastal defence ships and monitors developed at the shipyard as time went on. Of particular note was the monitor Vitse-admiral Popov, with its unusual circular hull. In 1868, the Scottish shipbuilder John Elder published an article that advocated that widening the beam of a ship would reduce the area that needed to be protected and allow it to carry thicker armour and heavier guns. In addition such a ship would have a shallower draught and that only a moderate increase in power would be required to match the speed of the normal ship. Rear-Admiral Andrei Alexandrovich Popov of the Imperial Russian Navy further broadened Elder's concept by broadening the ship so that it was actually circular. This started with the Novgorod, then culminated with Vitse-admiral Popov.

==== Battleships ====
The debacle of the Crimean War prompted the Imperial Russian Navy to enact a strategy of modernisation. As the era of the Age of Sail drew to a close, the Admiralty focussed on the development of modern battleships, to compete with the naval power of the Royal Navy and the French Navy in the later half of the 19th century.

The first battleship class specially built for the Black Sea Fleet was the Ekaterina II-class battleship. Their design was unusual in having main guns mounted on three barbettes grouped in a triangle around a central armoured redoubt. This was intended to maximise her forward facing firepower, adapted towards the shallow waters of the Black Sea. Ekaterina II was named after the Empress Catherine II of Russia. She was laid down on 26 June 1883, launched on 20 May 1886, and completed in 1889. The remaining three ships of the class were built at the Russian Steam Navigation Company shipyards in Sevastopol. Ekaterina II was followed on until 1910 by Dvenadsat Apostolov, Tri Sviatitelia, Rostislav, Knyaz' Potemkin-Tavricheskiy and Evstafi.

Pre-dreadnought battleships built at the Nikolayev Admiralty Shipyard

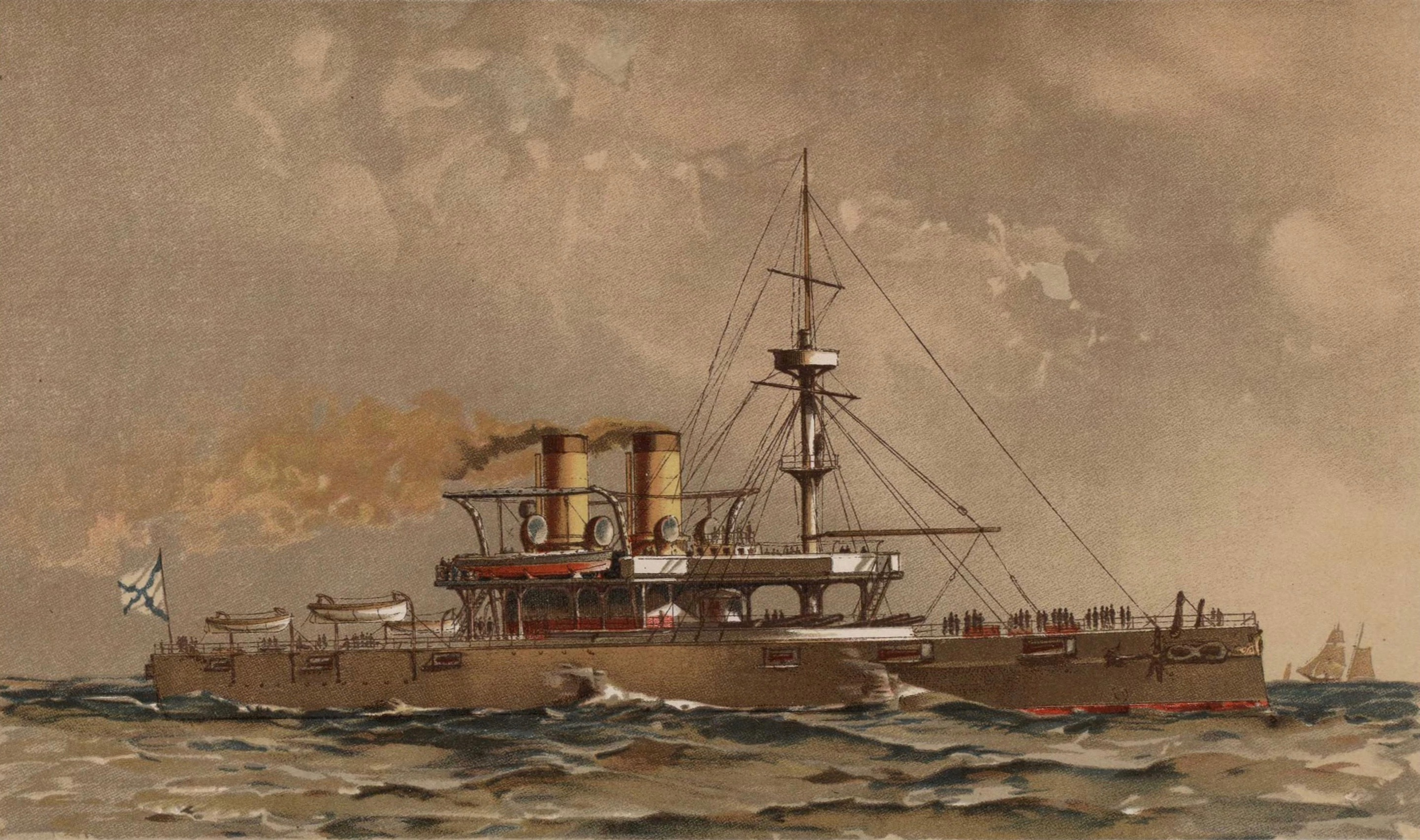
Ekaterina II

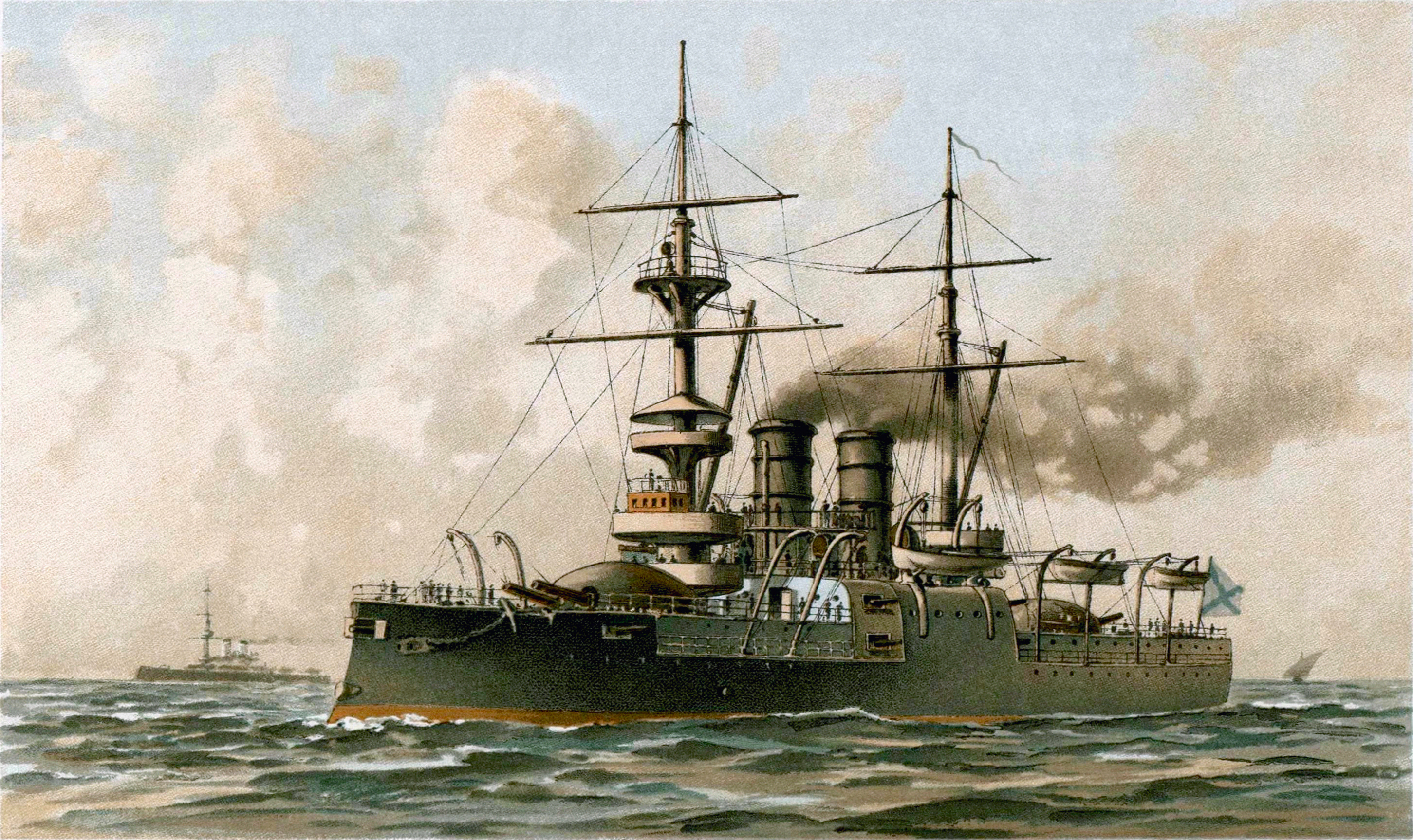
Dvenadsat Apostolov

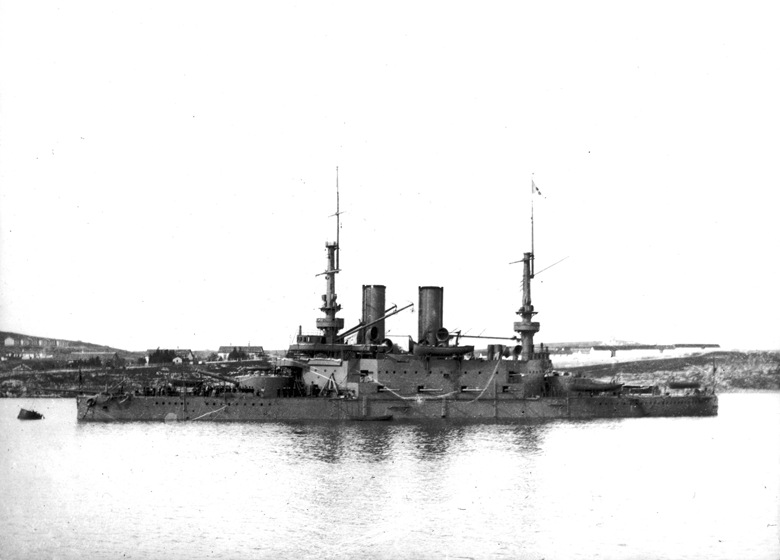
Tri Sviatitelia

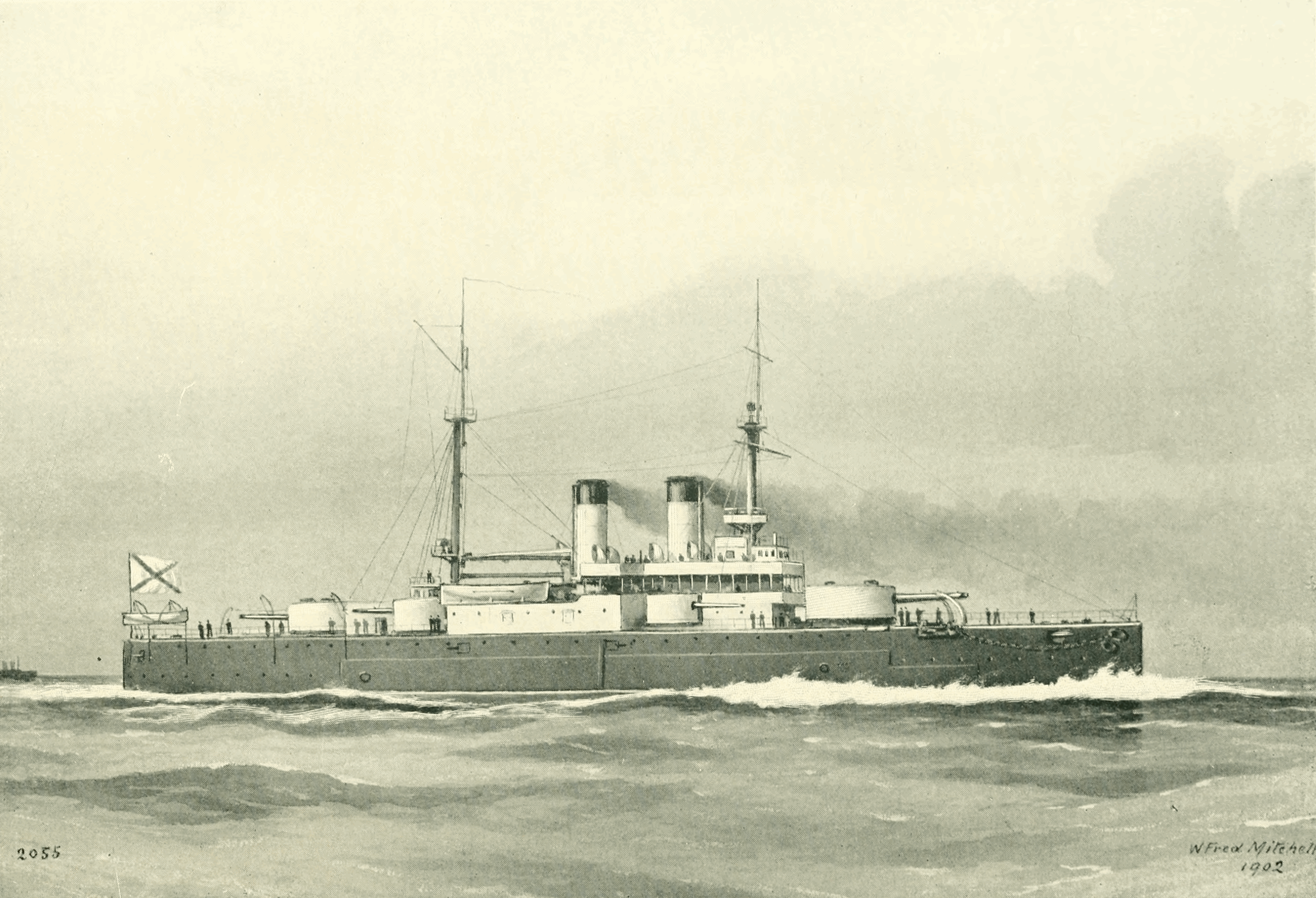
Rostislav

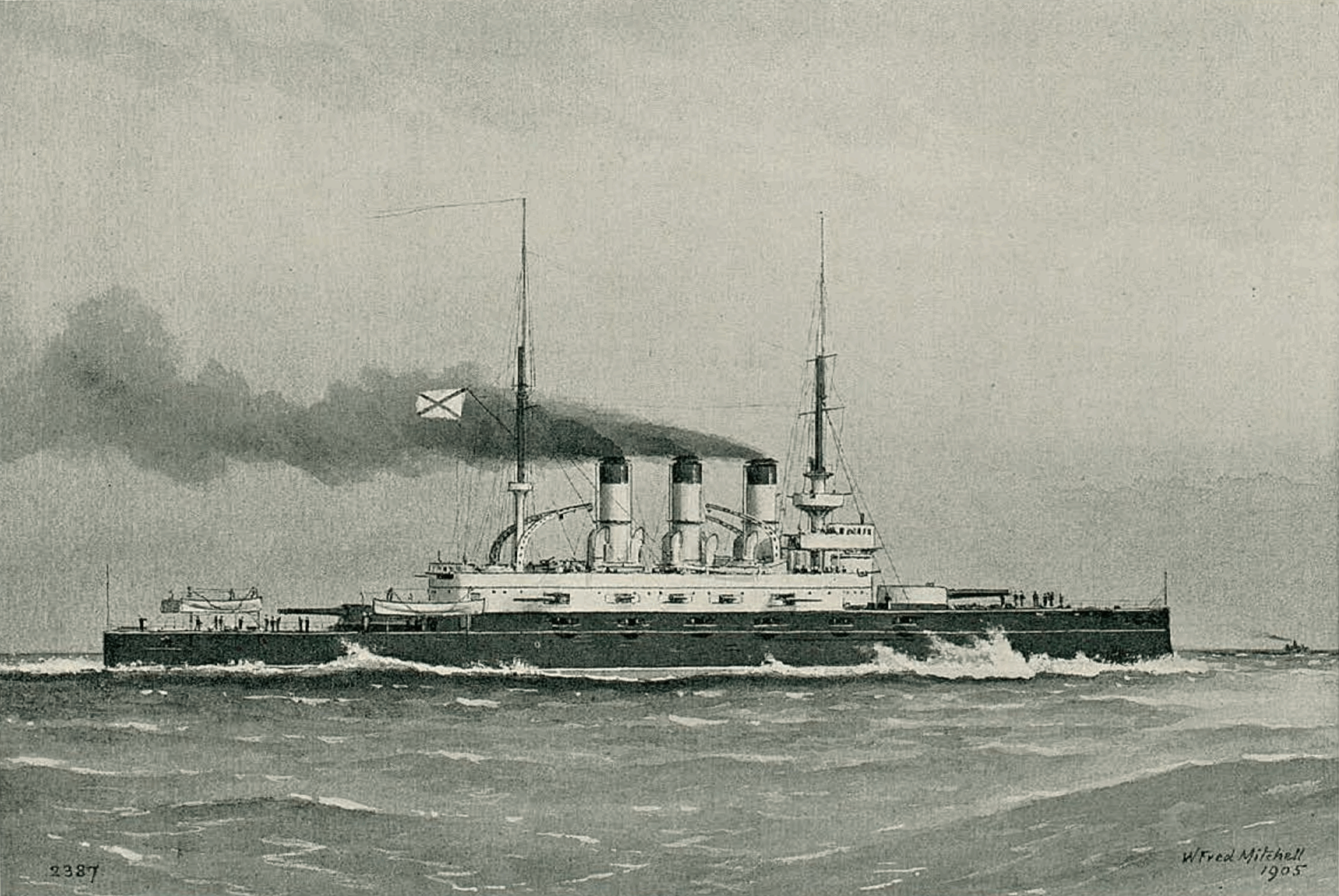
Knyaz' Potemkin-Tavricheskiy

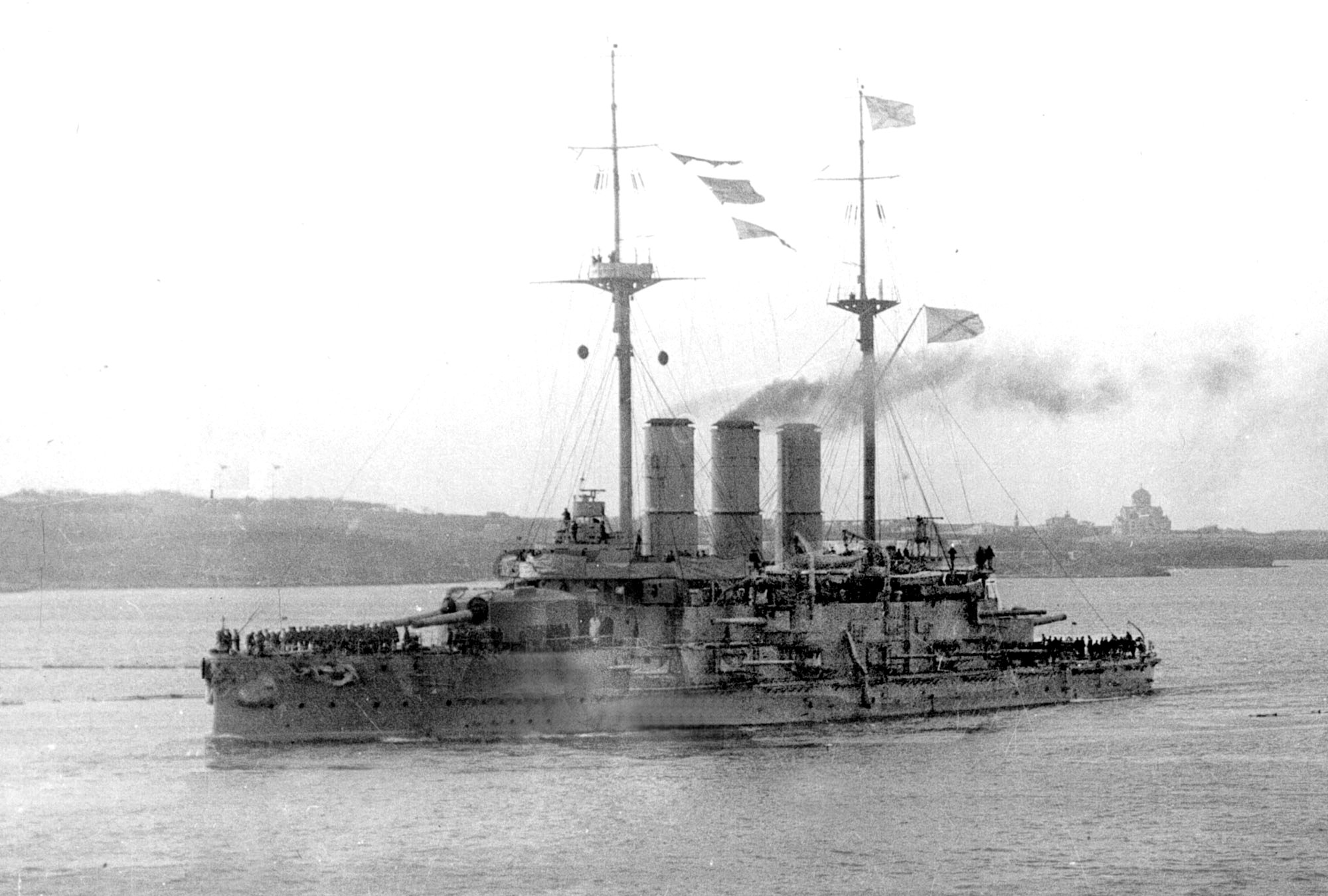
Evstafiy

==== Cruisers and destroyers ====
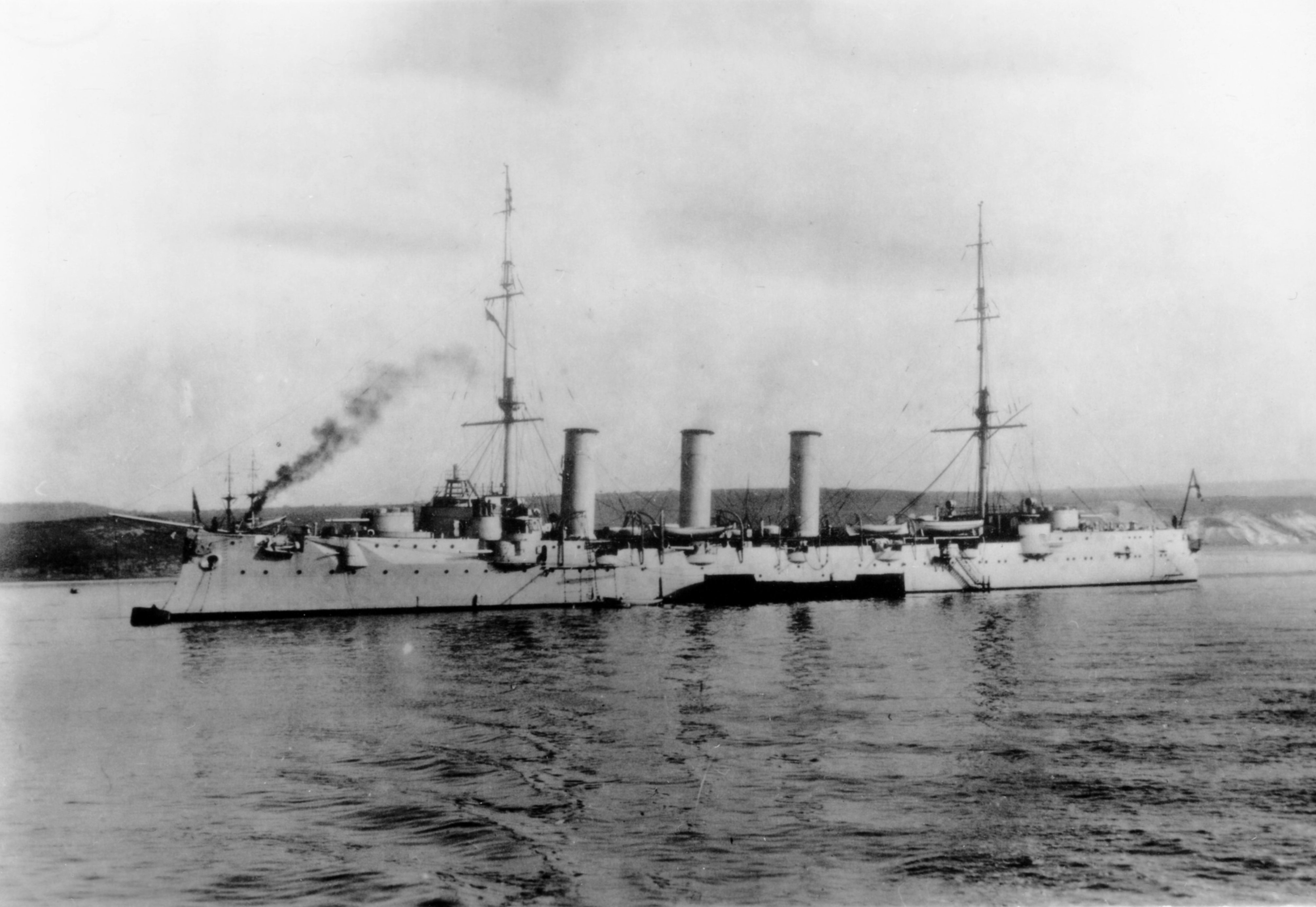
Pamyat Merkuriya

The ship Pamiat' Merkuria, named after the famous Russian brig Merkury, was laid down in 1900, launched in 1903 and completed in 1907. Munity at the shipyard during the Revolution of 1905 significantly delayed completion. In the turbulent period from the First World War to the Second World War, the ship would sail under the names, changing names to reflect the changing situation. The ship would be briefly named Hetman Ivan Mazepa, under control of the Ukrainian People's Republic, then the Ukrainian State, a puppet of the German Empire. Falling under control of the Soviet Navy, the ship would receive the name Komintern.

==== Coastal and torpedo boats ====
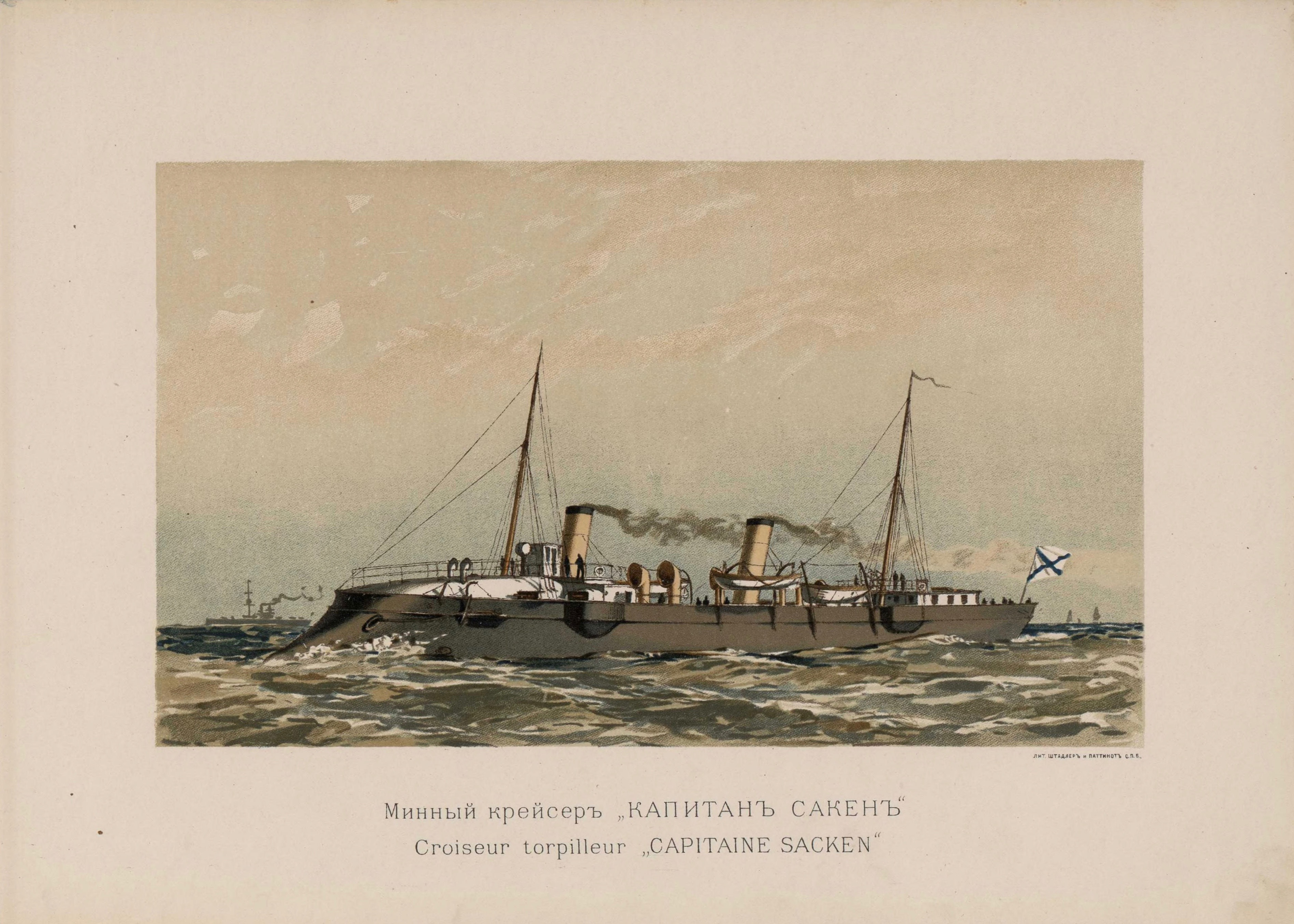
Kapitan Saken

In 1889, the ship Kapitan Saken was launched. At the same time, the Korets class gunboats Chernomorets, Donets, and Zaporozhets were also built. Additionally, the torpedo cruiser Griden was laid down on 04 September 1892, launched on 31 November 1893, commissioned in November 1895 and was assigned to the Black Sea Fleet.

=== Dreadnought era ===
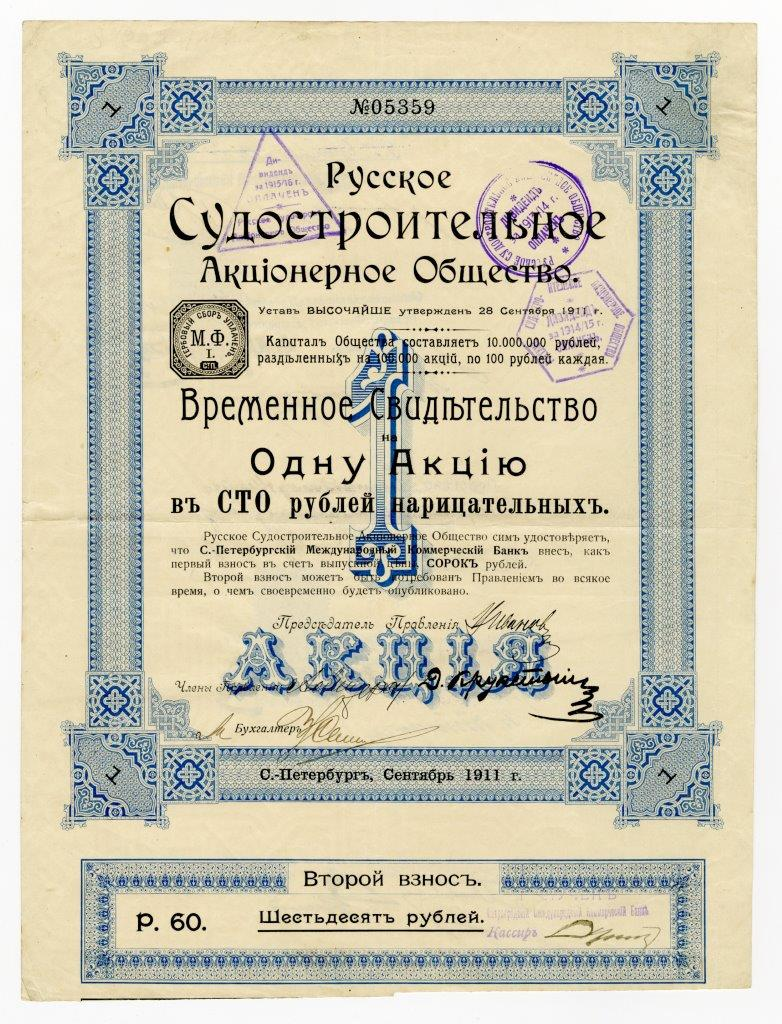
Stock certificate issued by the Russian Shipbuilding Company

To cope with the expansion of Russian shipbuilding in the early 20th century, the Saint Petersburg based joint stock company Russian Shipbuilding Company (Russian: Русскому судостроительному акционерному обществу) was formed. The company acquired a twenty-four year lease on the shipyard from the navy, with the option of purchasing the plant in 1916.

Between 1911 and 1914, two building berths with slip-ways, an assembling and welding workshop, a number of buildings and an outfitting wharf were built on the left bank of the Ingul River. The shipyard was given the new operational name Plant of the Russian Shipbuilding Company "Russud".

From 1911, two Imperatritsa Mariya-class battleships (Imperatritsa Mariya and Imperator Aleksandr III) were laid down. Imperatritsa Mariya would be launched in 1913, followed by the latter in 1914.

During World War I, the shipyard came under military control as a result of martial law. As a Several ships, including the Bars-class submarines Gagara and Utka, as well as a number of other auxiliary ships and vessels, including pontoons and landing barges, were constructed.

Early in the Soviet era, the shipyard was renamed to the Andre Marti (North) Yard. In 1931, the shipyard was named after 61 Communards. From then on, torpedo-boats, destroyers, light cruisers, submarines; naval supply vessels, including rescue vessels of various purposes equipped with deep-water operation systems were built. It was named Shipyard No. 200 (in the name of 61 Communards) on 30 December 1936 and was renumbered as Shipyard No. 445, when it reopened after the end of World War II.

== Facilities and services ==
The shipyard is about 11.4 square kilometers (4.4 sq mi), with a building area of about 476.5 square meters (5,129 sq ft) and 1–2 Kone four-legged cranes. Production capacities of the shipyard are concentrated in 286 industrial buildings and 165 industrial structures.

== Soviet-built ships ==
=== Cruisers ===
- Kronshtadt-class battlecruiser: 1 (along with Admiralty Shipyard)
- Kara-class cruiser: 7 (whole class)
- Slava-class cruiser: 4 (whole class)

=== Destroyers ===
- Skoryy-class destroyer: 18 (all names started with B)

=== Submarines ===
- Shchuka-class submarine, Series V-modified: 3
- Shchuka-class submarine, Series V-modified-2: 4
- Shchuka-class submarine, Series X: 8

== Notable vessels ==
The following vessels were constructed at this shipyard. The list is not all inclusive.

Notable Vessels Imperial Russian Navy (1696–1917) • Soviet Navy (1917–1991)
Name	Laid down	Launched	Displacement	Class (NATO)	Type
Vitse-admiral Popov	1874	1875	3,600 tons		Ironclad Monitor
Pamiat' Merkuria	1901	1902	6,645 tons	Bogatyr	Protected Cruiser
Imperator Aleksandr III	1911	1914	23,413 tons	Imperatritsa Mariya	Battleship
Imperatritsa Ekaterina Velikaya	1911	1913	24,644 tons	Imperatritsa Mariya	Battleship
Imperatritsa Mariya	1911	1913	23,413 tons	Imperatritsa Mariya	Battleship
Imperator Nikolai I	1915	1916	27,830 tons		Battleship
Soobrazitelny	1939	1939	1,727 tons	Storozhevoy (Project 7U)	Destroyer
Ognevoy	1939	1940	2,125 tons	Ognevoy (Project 30)	Destroyer
Gnevny	1957	1958	3,500 tons	Kanin (Project 57A)	Destroyer
Uporny	1958	1959	3,500 tons	Kanin (Project 57A)	Destroyer
Boyky	1959	1959	3,500 tons	Kanin (Project 57A)	Destroyer
ORP Warszawa	1966	1968	4,950 tons	Kashin (Project 61MP)	Large Anti-submarine Ship (Guided Missile Cruiser – western typing)
Nikolayev	1968	1969	9,700 tons	Kara (Project 1134B Berkut B)	Large Anti-submarine Ship (Guided Missile Cruiser – western typing)
Slava	1976	1979	12,490 tons	Slava (Project 1164 Atlant)	Guided Missile Cruiser

Note: NATO class only shown if applicable; classes of vessels launched before 1949 are provided as originally designated. The name of the ship provided is the name given when launched–some ships may have since been renamed.

== Bibliography ==
- Breyer, Siegfried (1992). Soviet Warship Development: Volume 1: 1917–1937. London: Conway Maritime Press. ISBN 0-85177-604-3.
- Harrison, Mark; Cooper, Julian; Dexter, Keith & Rodionov, Ivan (2003). The Numbered Factories and Other Establishments of the Soviet Defence Industry Complex, 1927 to 1968, Part I, Factories & Shipyards (Version 8 ed.). Warwick, UK: University of Warwick, Department of Economics.
- Hauner, Milan L. (Spring 2004). "Stalin's Big-Fleet Program". Naval War College Review. LVII (2). Archived from the original on 2017-04-28.
- Polmar, Norman (1983). Guide to the Soviet Navy (3rd ed.). Annapolis, Maryland: Naval Institute Press. ISBN 0-87021-239-7.
- Polmar, Norman & Noot, Jurrien (1991). Submarines of the Russian and Soviet Navies, 1718–1990. Annapolis, Maryland: Naval Institute Press. ISBN 0-87021-570-1.
- Treadea, John & Sozaev, Eduard (2010). Russian Warships in the Age of Sail, 1696–1860: Design, Construction, Careers and Fates. Barnsley, UK: Seaforth Publishing. ISBN 978-1-84832-058-1.
