= Russian ship of the line Sinop =

History

Russian Empire
- Name: Sinop (Russian: Синоп)
- Namesake: Battle of Sinop
- Builder: Nikolaev Admiralty shipyard, Nikolaev
- Laid down: 29 October 1852 (Note: All dates used in this article are Old Style)
- Launched: 26 September 1858
- Completed: 31 August 1858 (Note: This date is obviously a typographic error)
- In service: 1860
- Stricken: 26 January 1874

General characteristics
- Type: 135-gun, steam-powered ship of the line
- Displacement: 5,585 long tons (5,675 t)
- Tons burthen: 3,813 bm
- Length: 242 ft 2 in (73.8 m) (p/p)
- Beam: 59 ft 6 in (18.1 m)
- Draft: 25 ft 10 in (7.9 m)
- Installed power: 800 nominal horsepower; 6 × boilers
- Propulsion: 1 shaft; 1 Maudslay, Sons and Field steam engine
- Speed: 11 knots (20 km/h; 13 mph)
- Armament: 35 × 60-pounder smoothbore guns; 12 × long 36-pounder guns; 36 × short 36-pounder guns; 34 × 36-pounder gunnades; 18 × 36-pounder howitzers

Sinop (Russian: Синоп) was a wooden-hulled, steam-powered, first-rate ship of the line built for the Imperial Russian Navy in the mid-1850s. Intended to serve with the Black Sea Fleet, she was transferred to the Baltic Fleet before her engine was installed in accordance with the terms of the Treaty of Paris that ended the Crimean War. Built of unseasoned oak, Sinop saw little service before she was stricken from the Navy Directory in 1874.

== Description ==
Sinop was 242 feet 2 inches (73.8 m) long between perpendiculars, with a beam of 59 feet 6 inches (18.1 m) and a maximum draft of 25 feet 10 inches (7.9 m). The ship displaced 5,585 long tons (5,675 t) and measured 3,813 tons bm. She was equipped with an imported British Maudslay, Sons and Field steam engine of 800 nominal horsepower that drove a single propeller shaft. This gave her a maximum speed of 11 knots (20 km/h; 13 mph). Sinop was rated as a 135-gun ship of the line and she was equipped with a variety of smoothbore guns. On the forecastle and quarterdeck, the ship was fitted with one 60-pounder gun on a pivot mount, four short 36-pounder guns and eighteen 36-pounder howitzers. On her upper deck, she carried four long 36-pounder guns and thirty-two 36-pounder gunnades while the armament of her middle deck was similar except that short 36-pounder guns were used instead of the gunnades. On her lower deck, Sinop was fitted with thirty-four 60-pounder shell guns and four long 36-pounder guns.

== Construction and career ==
Originally named Bosfor, the ship was laid down on 29 October 1852 at the Nikolaev Admiralty shipyard in Nikolaev using unseasoned oak. She received her final name, commemorating the Russian victory at the Battle of Sinop, on 30 March 1856. The start of the Crimean War in 1854 prevented the delivery of her British-built engine so Sinop was launched on 12 October 1858 without her engine or guns. This was done to allow the ship to transfer to the Baltic Fleet since the Treaty of Paris demilitarized the Black Sea. En route to Kronstadt in 1858–59, her repairs to stop leaks were completed at Toulon on 9 March 1859. Sinop received her machinery the following year and her further activities were very sparse, consisting solely of a practice cruise in 1861 from Kronstadt to the island of Gogland. She was stricken on 26 January 1874.
