= Soviet destroyer Zhguchy (1959) =

Kanin-class destroyer

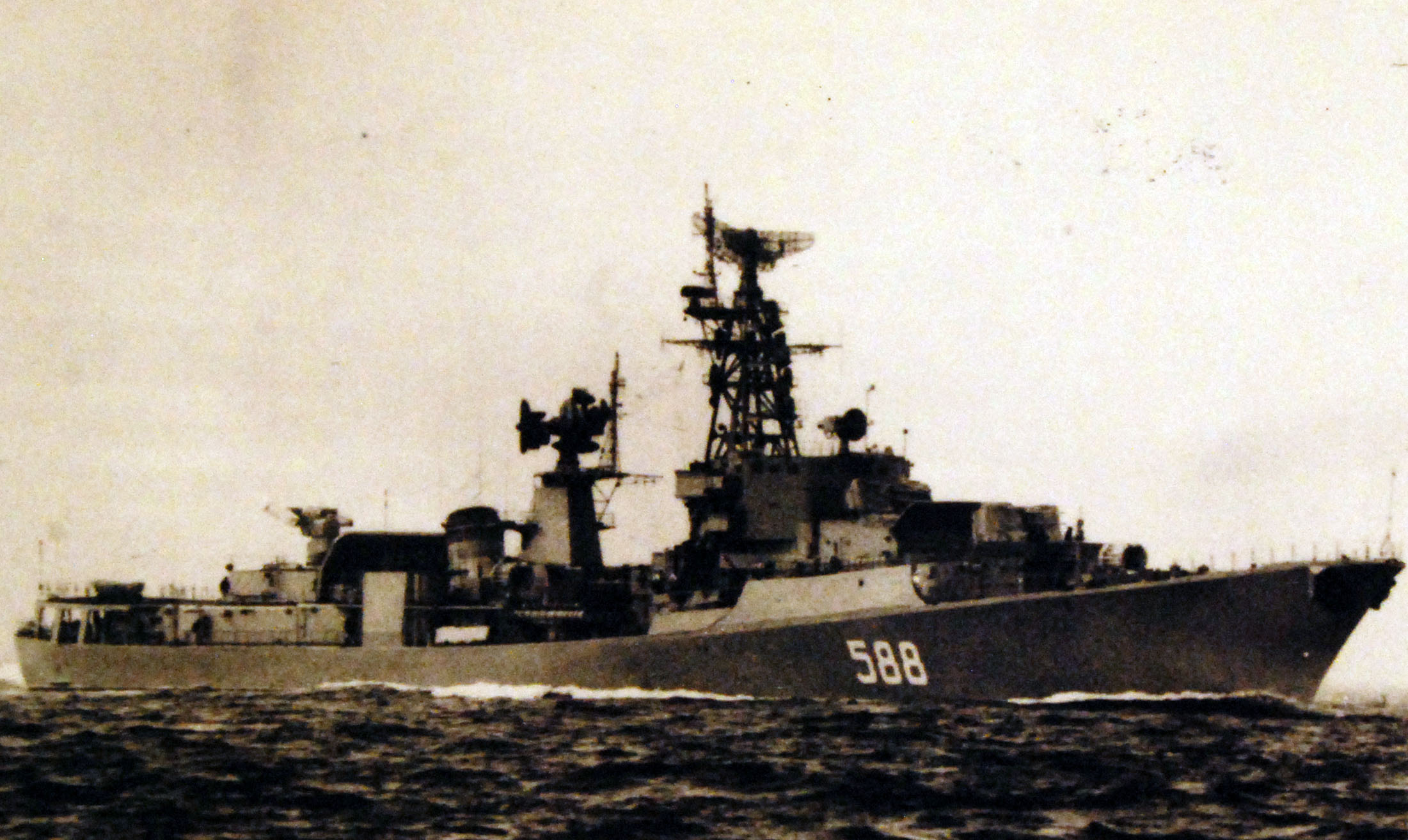
- Zhguchy in September 1977

History

Soviet Union
- Name: Zhguchy; (Жгучий)
- Namesake: Burning in Russian
- Builder: Zhdanov Shipyard
- Laid down: 23 June 1958
- Launched: 14 October 1959
- Commissioned: 23 December 1960
- Decommissioned: 30 July 1987
- Home port: Severomorsk
- Fate: Scrapped, 1988

General characteristics
- Class & type: Kanin-class destroyer
- Displacement: as built: 3,500 long tons (3,556 t) standard; 4,192 long tons (4,259 t) full load; as modernised: 3,700 long tons (3,759 t) standard; 4,500 long tons (4,572 t) full load
- Length: 126.1 m (414 ft)
- Beam: 12.7 m (42 ft)
- Draught: 4.2 m (14 ft)
- Installed power: 72,000 hp (54,000 kW)
- Propulsion: 2 × shaft geared steam turbines; 4 × boilers
- Speed: as built 34.5 knots (63.9 km/h; 39.7 mph)
- Complement: 320
- Sensors & processing systems: Radar: Angara/Head Net air-search radar; Zalp-Shch missile director; Neptun surface-search radar; Sonar: Pegas-2, replaced by Titan-2
- Armament: as built: 2 × SS-N-1 launchers (12 Missiles); 4 × quad 57 mm (2.2 in) guns; 2 × triple 533 mm (21 in) Torpedo tubes; 2 × RBU-2500 anti submarine rocket launchers; as modernised: 1 × twin SA-N-1 SAM launcher (32 Missiles); 2 × quad 57 mm (2.2 in) guns; 2 × twin 30 mm (1.2 in) AK-230 guns; 10 × 533 mm (21 in) torpedo tubes; 3 × RBU-6000 anti submarine rocket launchers
- Aviation facilities: Helipad

Zhguchy was the second ship of the Kanin-class destroyer of the Soviet Navy.

== History ==
The ship was built at Zhdanov Shipyard in Leningrad and was launched on 14 October 1959 and commissioned into the Northern Fleet on 23 December 1960.

In 1965 and 1966, she won the prize of the Commander-in-Chief of the Navy for missile training (as part of the KUG). On 19 May, she was reclassified as a large rocket ship (BRK).

From February 6, 1967, to January 10, 1969, she was modernized and rebuilt according to Project 57-A at the Leningrad shipyard named after V.I. A. A. Zhdanova. On 21 October 1969, she was reclassified into a large anti-submarine ship (BOD).

From January 1 to December 31, 1970, while carrying out combat service in the war zone in the Mediterranean Sea, she provided assistance to the armed forces of Egypt. From September 10 to September 15, 1971, she paid a visit to Oslo. In the period from 21 to 26 September 1971, the ship visited Rotterdam (Netherlands). From 12 to 17 May 1975, she visited Boston and Cuba, from 24 to 29 May 1977, she visited Cherbourg, from 10 to 15 October of the same year, she visited Oslo again. From May 1980 to January 1981, she served in the Atlantic Ocean, thereby setting a record for the longest voyage among Soviet warships. She visited the ports of Angola, Guinea, and Benin. She protected Soviet and Cuban fishermen in the Western Sahara region.

On 30 July 1987, the destroyer was retired from the USSR Navy in connection with the delivery to the OFI for disarmament, dismantling and sale. On August 6, her crew was disbanded.

In December 1988, she was sold to a private Spanish firm in Spain.
