= Russian ship of the line Tsesarevich (1857) =

Imperial Russian Navy ship

History

Russian Empire
- Name: Tsesarevich (Russian: Цесаревич)
- Namesake: Tsesarevich
- Builder: Nikolaev Admiralty shipyard, Nikolaev
- Laid down: 3 August 1853 (Note: All dates used in this article are Old Style)
- Launched: 29 October 1857
- Commissioned: 12 October 1858
- In service: 1860
- Stricken: 26 January 1874

General characteristics
- Type: 135-gun, steam-powered ship of the line
- Displacement: 5,563 long tons (5,652 t)
- Tons burthen: 3,821 bm
- Length: 241 ft 6 in (73.6 m) (p/p)
- Beam: 60 ft (18.3 m)
- Draft: 25 ft 9 in (7.8 m)
- Installed power: 800 nominal horsepower; 6 × boilers
- Propulsion: 1 shaft; 1 Maudslay, Sons and Field steam engine
- Speed: 11 knots (20 km/h; 13 mph)
- Armament: 35 × 60-pounder smoothbore guns; 12 × long 36-pounder guns; 36 × short 36-pounder guns; 34 × 36-pounder gunnades; 18 × 36-pounder howitzers

Tsesarevich (Russian: Цесаревич) was a wooden-hulled, steam-powered, first-rate ship of the line built for the Imperial Russian Navy in the mid-1850s. Intended to serve with the Black Sea Fleet, she was transferred to the Baltic Fleet before her engine was installed in accordance with the terms of the Treaty of Paris that ended the Crimean War. Built of unseasoned oak, Tsesarevich saw little service, before she was stricken from the Navy Directory in 1874.

== Description, construction and career ==
Tsesarevich was 241 feet 6 inches (73.6 m) long between perpendiculars, with a beam of 60 feet (18.3 m) and a maximum draft of 25 feet 9 inches (7.8 m). The ship displaced 5,563 long tons (5,652 t) and measured 3,821 tons bm. She was equipped with an imported British Maudslay, Sons and Field steam engine of 800 nominal horsepower that drove a single propeller shaft. Tsesarevich was rated as a 135-gun ship of the line and she was equipped with a variety of smoothbore guns. On the forecastle and quarterdeck, the ship was fitted with one 60-pounder gun on a pivot mount, four short 36-pounder guns and eighteen 36-pounder howitzers. On her upper deck, she carried four long 36-pounder guns and thirty-two 36-pounder gunnades while the armament of her middle deck was similar except that short 36-pounder guns were used instead of the gunnades. On her lower deck, Tsesarevich was fitted with thirty-four 60-pounder shell guns and four long 36-pounder guns.

The ship was laid down on 3 August 1853 at the Nikolaev Admiralty shipyard in Nikolaev using unseasoned oak. The start of the Crimean War in 1854 prevented the delivery of her British-built engine so Tsesarevich was launched on 29 October 1857 without her engine. This was done to allow the ship to transfer to the Baltic Fleet since the Treaty of Paris demilitarized the Black Sea. En route to Kronstadt in 1858–59, her repairs to stop leaks were completed at Malta on 8 April 1859. Tsesarevich received her machinery the following year and she cruised the Baltic Sea in 1861. Her further activities, if any, are unknown and the ship was stricken on 26 January 1874.

== Bibliography ==
- Tredrea, John; Sozaev, Eduard (2010). Russian Warships in the Age of Sail, 1696–1860: Design, Construction, Careers and Fates. Barnsley, UK: Seaforth Publishing. ISBN 978-1-84832-058-1.
