= Soviet cruiser Admiral Nakhimov =

At least two warships of the Soviet Navy have borne the name Admiral Nakhimov, in honour of Pavel Nakhimov an admiral of the Imperial Russian Navy.

- Soviet cruiser Admiral Nakhimov (1951), a Sverdlov-class cruiser launched in 1951.
- Soviet cruiser Admiral Nakhimov (1969), a Kresta II-class cruiser launched in 1969.

== See also ==
- Russian ship Admiral Nakhimov
