= KSShch =

Soviet anti-ship cruise missile design

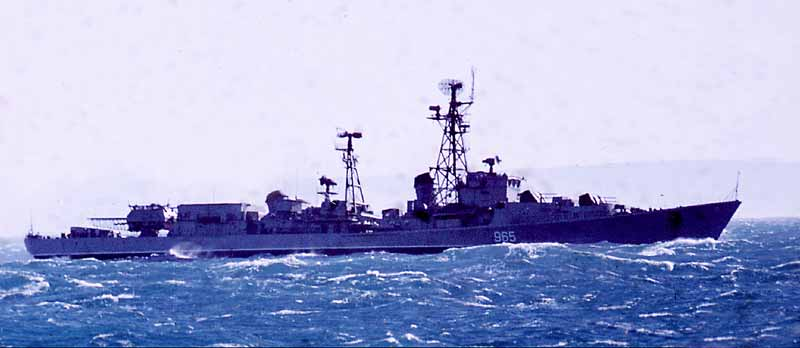
Armored launcher SM-59 (note horizontal rail) on the stern of Kildin-class Neulovimy

The KSShch (Russian: Корабельный снаряд «Щука» (КСЩ); tr.:Korabelny snaryad Shchuka (KSShch); English: Anti-Ship Missile "Pike") was a Soviet anti-ship cruise missile design that carried a nuclear warhead. Its GRAU designation is 4K32. It was sometimes referred to as P-1 Strela (П-1 «Стрела», "Arrow"). It was used in the 1950s and 1960s. The missile's NATO reporting name was SS-N-1 Scrubber. It was tested in 1953–1954 on the destroyer Bedovyy (Kildin class) and entered service in 1955, being deployed on Kildin and Krupnyy (later converted to Kanin)-class ships. It was fired from a heavy rail launcher SM-59, with an armoured hangar. As those ships were retrofitted and modernized between 1966 and 1977, the missiles were removed (in favor of the SS-N-2 on the Kildin class and an anti-aircraft/anti-submarine weapons suite on the Kanin class).

== Specifications ==
- Total length: 7.6 m (25 ft)
- Diameter: 900 mm (3 ft)
- Wingspan: 4.6 m (15 ft)
- Weight: 3,100 kg (6830 lb)
- Warhead: nuclear warhead or High Explosive
- Propulsion: liquid-fuel rocket
- Range: 68 km (42 mi)
- Guidance: inertial guidance
- Contractor: NPO Mashinostroenia
- Entered service: 1955

== Operators ==
Soviet Union

- The Soviet Navy employed the KSShch on Kildin and Kanin-class ships and tested aboard the Project 68ER cruiser Admiral Nakhimov. The missile was withdrawn by 1977.

== See also ==
- KS-1 Komet – (Soviet Union)
- Saab Rb 08 – (Sweden)
- P-20 Sokol
- P-40 – (Soviet Union)
