= Kanin-class destroyer =

Soviet destroyer built 1957–1960

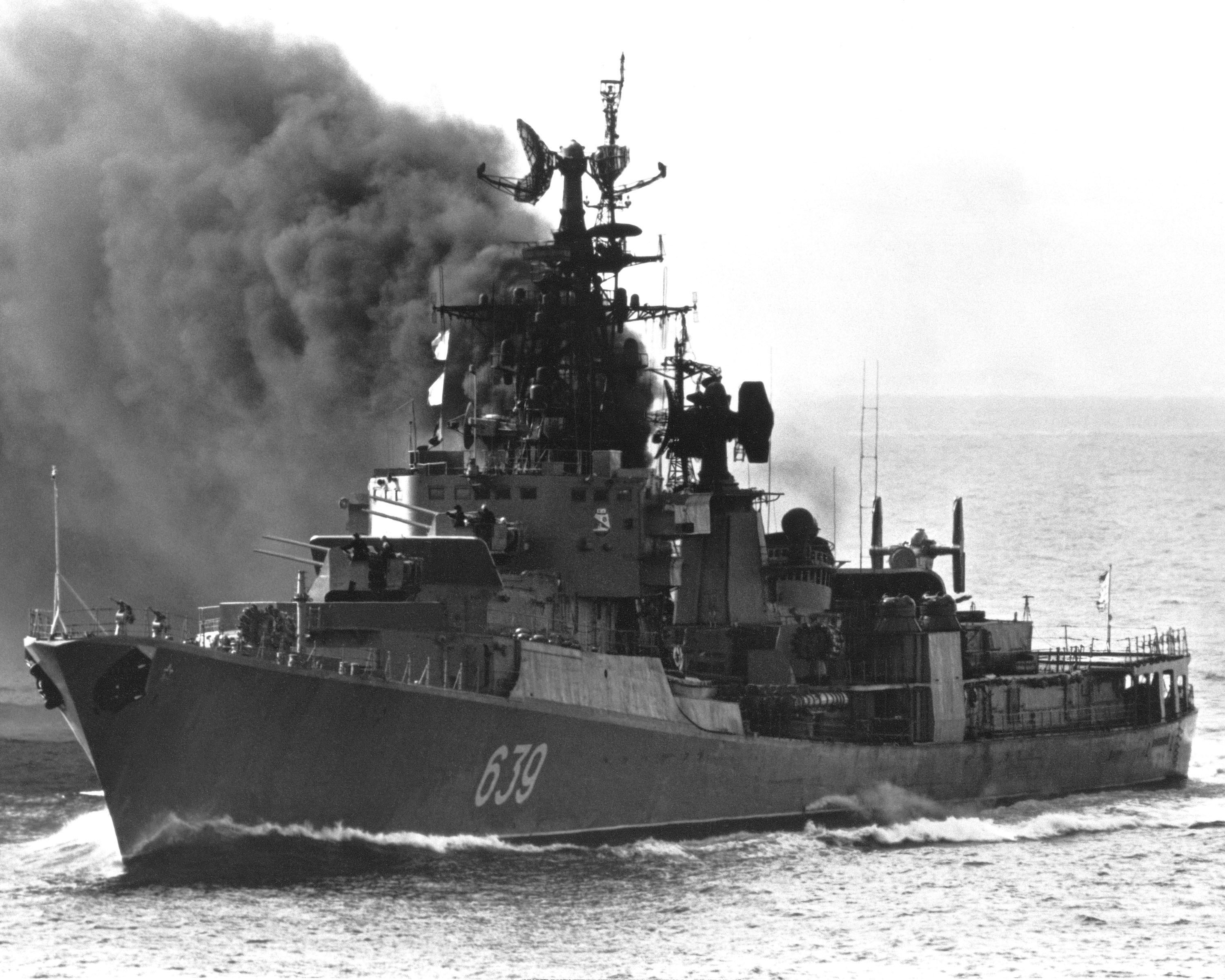
- Kanin-class destroyer

Class overview
- Name: Project 57A & Project 57bis
- Operators: Soviet Navy; Russian Navy
- Preceded by: Kildin class
- Succeeded by: Kashin class
- Built: 1957–1960
- In commission: 1960–1993
- Planned: 9
- Completed: 8
- Canceled: 1
- Retired: 8

General characteristics
- Type: Guided missile destroyer
- Displacement: as built 3,500 long tons (3,556 t) standard, 4,192 long tons (4,259 t) full load; as modernised 3,700 long tons (3,759 t) standard, 4,500 long tons (4,572 t) full load
- Length: 126.1 m (414 ft)
- Beam: 12.7 m (42 ft)
- Draught: 4.2 m (14 ft)
- Installed power: 72,000 hp (54,000 kW)
- Propulsion: 2 × shaft geared steam turbines, 4 boilers,
- Speed: as built 34.5 knots (63.9 km/h; 39.7 mph)
- Complement: 320
- Sensors & processing systems: Radar: Angara/Head Net (air search),Zalp-Shch (missile guidance) Neptun (surface); Sonar: Pegas-2, replaced by Titan-2
- Armament: as built; 2 x KSShch launchers (12 Missiles), 16 x 57 mm (2.2 in) guns, (4x4); 6 x 533 mm (21 in) Torpedo tubes (2x3), 2 x RBU-2500 anti submarine rocket launchers; as modernised; 1 x 2 M-1 Volna SAM launcher (32 Missiles), 8 x 57 mm (2.2 in) guns (2x4), 4 x 30 mm (1.2 in) AK-230 dual autocannons, 10 x 533 mm (21 in) torpedo tubes for anti-submarine torpedoes, 3 x RBU-6000 anti submarine rocket launchers
- Aviation facilities: helicopter pad

The Kanin class were a class of destroyers of the Soviet Navy during the Cold War. The Soviet designation was Project 57A Gnevny (not to be confused with the World War II era Project 7). These ships were the first Soviet guided missile destroyers and were initially designated Project 57bis (or 57b) and known to NATO as the Krupny class. Their primary mission was anti-surface warfare using the KSShch anti-ship missile.

== Design ==
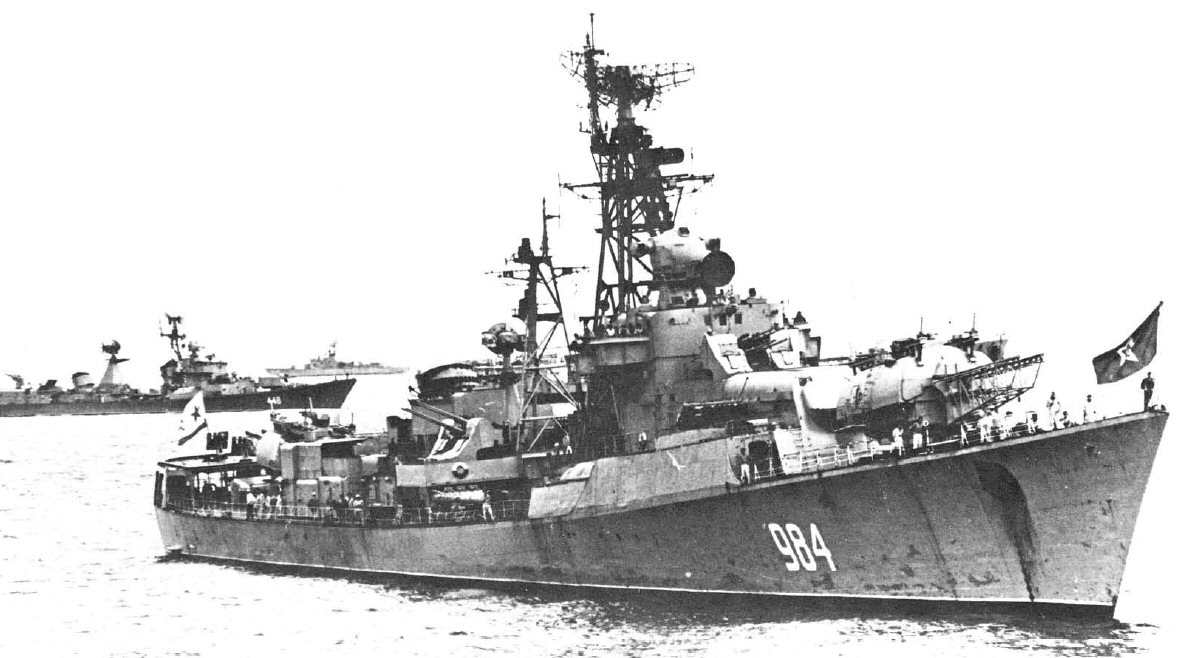
Gnevny with original Project 57bis ("Krupny class") armament

Designed from as gun armed destroyers with 3 pairs of 130mm guns, their layout was completed in 1956. However, in February 1957, the incoming chief of staff, Admiral Sergey Gorshkov ordered changes after missile armed versions of the Kotlin class were deemed unsuccessful. Their initial purpose was surface engagement with opposing naval vessels and shore targets. The SS-N-1 missile installed in this class for that specific mission. The destroyers carried two launchers for the SS-N-1, one located at each end of the ship, each magazine holding six additional missiles.

The hull was scaled up from the Kotlin class, and the machinery was the same as those ships, except that remote control stations were installed and electrical generating capacity was increased. The superstructure was made of steel rather than the aluminium/ magnesium alloy of the Kotlin class ships and accommodation was significantly improved.

Criticisms of the class include that they had limited self-defence weaponry and that their main weapon, the SS-N-1 was soon obsolescent after introduction.

== ASW conversion ==
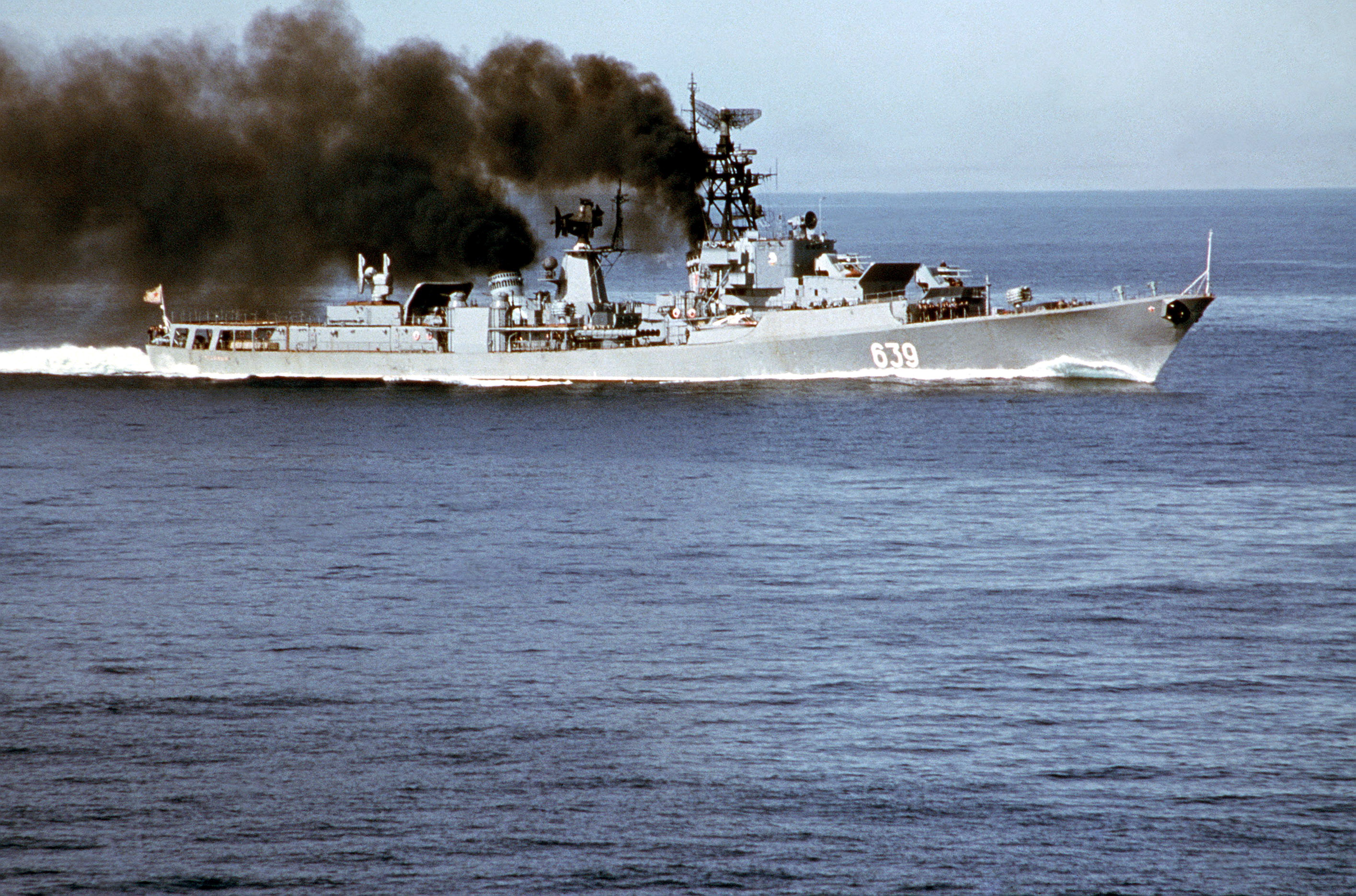
Gremyashchy in 1983 post modernisation

The limitations of the KSShch missile were clear by 1965 and the Soviet Navy decided to convert the ships to a more general purpose / ASW role. These ships were called the Kanin class by NATO. This involved providing the destroyers with a new bow sonar, MG-332 Titan-2 that controlled two quintuple torpedo tubes and three RBU-6000s. To clear the bow sonar also required that the bow be extended 5.3 feet (1.6 m). A helicopter pad was installed aft that allowed the ships to operate a Kamov Ka-25 helicopter.

To improve the destroyers' self-defence, launchers firing M-1 Volna anti-air missiles were installed along with two quadruple-mounted 57mm guns. All of these installations required more power and hence, the diesel generator was upgraded to 500 kW and a second generator of that capability was installed. All of this increased the displacement of the ships by 200 tons standard and 308 tons fully loaded and decreased its speed to 32 knots (59 km/h; 37 mph).

According to Conway's the modernisation proved very expensive and appeared to have deterred the Soviets from any further comprehensive rebuilding of older ships.

== Operations ==
In May 1975, to commemorate the 30th anniversary of Victory in Europe, Boyky and Zhguchy made a five-day visit to Boston, Massachusetts. This was the first post-war visit by a Soviet naval ship to the United States.

== Ships ==
Kanin-class destroyers
Ship	Russian	Builder	Laid down	Launched	Commissioned	Fleet	Fate
Gremyashchy	Гремящий	Zhdanov Shipyard, Leningrad	25 February 1958	30 April 1959	30 June 1960	Northern Fleet	Decommissioned 1991
Zhguchy	Жгучий	Zhdanov Shipyard, Leningrad	23 June 1958	14 October 1959	23 December 1960	Northern Fleet	Decommissioned 1987
Zorky	Зоркий	Zhdanov Shipyard, Leningrad	17 April 1959	30 April 1960	30 September 1961	Baltic Fleet	Decommissioned 1993
Derzky	Дерзкий	Zhdanov Shipyard, Leningrad	10 October 1959	4 February 1960	30 December 1961	Northern Fleet	Decommissioned 1990
Gnevny	Гневный	North Nikolayev Shipyard, Mykolaiv	17 December 1957	30 November 1958	10 January 1960	Black Sea Fleet (Pacific Fleet from 1970)	Decommissioned 1988
Uporny	Упорный	North Nikolayev Shipyard, Mykolaiv	9 April 1958	14 October 1959	3 December 1960	Pacific Fleet	Decommissioned 1993
Boyky	Бойкий	North Nikolayev Shipyard, Mykolaiv	2 April 1959	15 December 1959	16 June 1961	Black Sea Fleet	Decommissioned 1988
Gordy	Гордый	Amur Shipbuilding Plant, Komsomolsk-on-Amur	May 1959	15 December 1960	6 February 1961	Pacific Fleet	Decommissioned 1987
Khrabry	Храбрый	Amur Shipbuilding Plant, Komsomolsk-on-Amur	1959	1961	Cancelled 1963		Completed as a stationary power generation ship "ЭНС-73" in 1969 and out of service in 1982

== See also ==
- List of ships of the Soviet Navy
- List of ships of Russia by project number
