= Surface-search radar =

Naval surface location radar

A surface-search radar, sometimes more accurately known as a sea-surface-search radar or naval surveillance radar, is a type of military radar intended primarily to locate objects on the surface of lakes and oceans. Part of almost every modern naval ship, they are also widely used on maritime patrol aircraft and naval helicopters. When mounted on an aircraft, they are sometimes known, in British terminology, as air-to-surface-vessel radar — ASV for short. Similar radars are also widely used on civilian ships and even small pleasure craft, in which case they are more commonly known as marine radar.

As with conventional surveillance radars, these systems detect objects from the reflections of radio signals off target objects, especially metal. The range of a surface-search radar is greatly increased compared to other roles due to several aspects of the sea surfaces and the objects in it. In low sea states, water makes an excellent reflector for radio signals, which helps maximize the signal strength as reflections off the water strike the targets in addition to the line-of-sight signal. Additionally, as the sides of ships generally rise vertically from the surface, they form partial corner cubes which increases the returned signal.

Offsetting these advantages is the fact that in higher sea states, large waves also create the same signals, making radar clutter a significant problem. A considerable amount of research into clutter reduction was applied to the naval market.

== See also ==
- ASV Mk. II radar
