= Russian cruiser Marshal Ustinov =

Slava-class guided missile cruiser

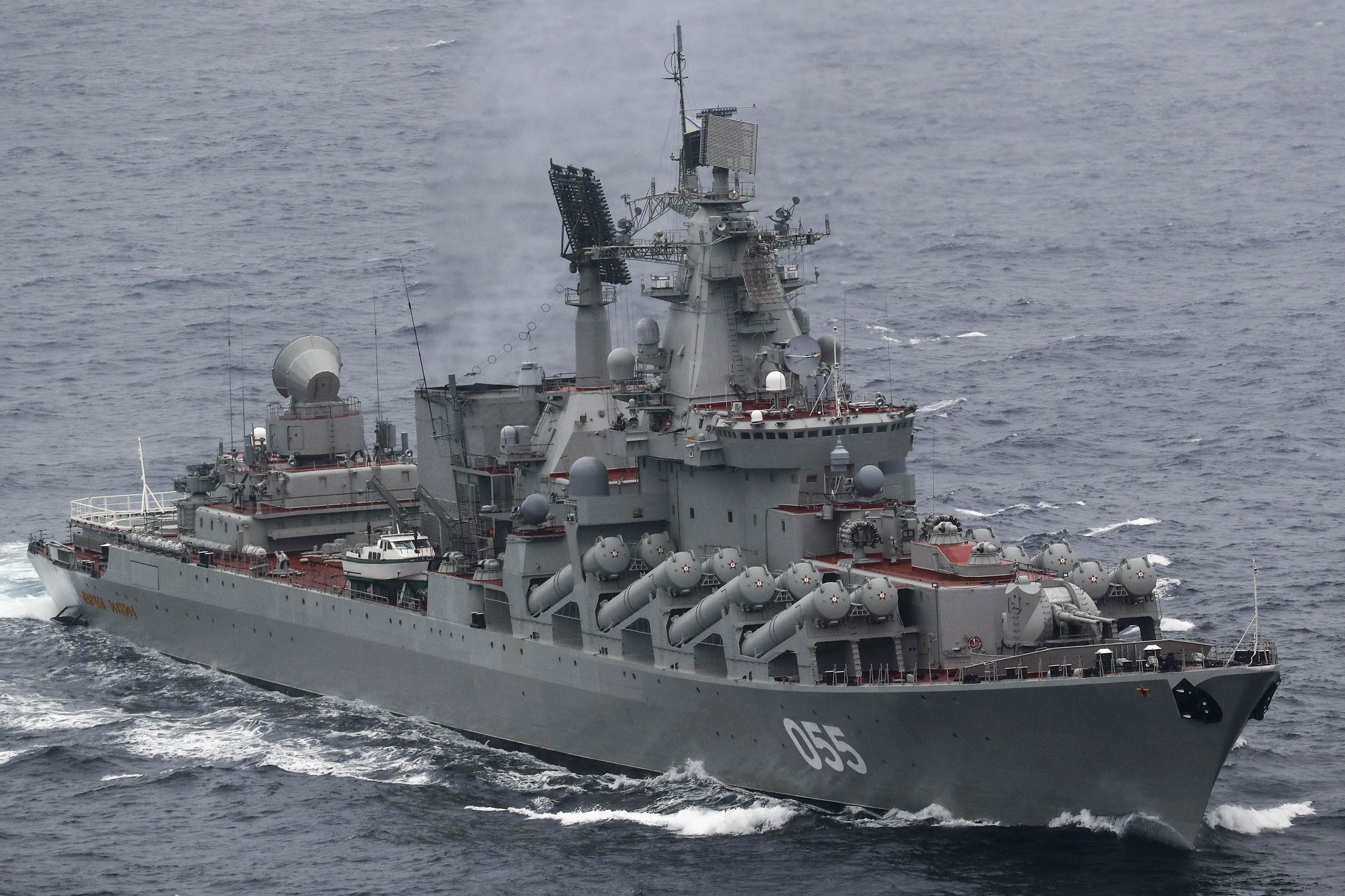
- Marshal Ustinov in 2018, after modernisation

History

Soviet Union/Russia
- Name: Marshal Ustinov
- Namesake: Dmitriy Ustinov
- Builder: 61 Kommuna#445 Yard, Mykolaiv, USSR
- Laid down: 5 October 1978
- Launched: 25 February 1982
- Commissioned: 19 September 1986
- Home port: Severomorsk
- Status: in active service

General characteristics as built
- Class & type: Guided missile cruiser
- Displacement: 10,000 t (10,000 long tons) standard; 12,700 t (12,500 long tons) full load
- Length: 186.4 m (611 ft 7 in)
- Beam: 20.8 m (68 ft 3 in)
- Draught: 8.4 m (27 ft 7 in)
- Propulsion: COGOG; 4 × 23,300 kW (31,250 shp) boost gas turbines; 2 × 8,900 kW (12,000 shp) cruise gas turbines; 2 × shafts
- Speed: 34 knots (63 km/h; 39 mph)
- Range: 9,000 nmi (17,000 km; 10,000 mi) at 15 knots (28 km/h; 17 mph)
- Complement: 505
- Sensors & processing systems: Radar: MR-650 Podberezovik-ET2 three-dimensional long-range target acquisition radar; Fregat-M2M sea-skimming target acquisition radar; Sonar: MG-332 Tigan-2T/Bull Nose hull-mounted LF; Zarya-SK MF VDS; Fire control: MR-184/Kite Screech for 130 mm guns; 3R41 Volna/Top Dome SA-N-6 SAM control; MPZ-301 Baza/Pop Group SA-N-4 SAM control; Argument/Front Door-C SSM control
- Electronic warfare & decoys: Kol'cho suite with Gurzhor-A&B/Side Globe intercept; MR-404/Rum Tub jammers
- Armament: Missiles: 16 (8 x 2) P-1000 Vulkan (SS-N-12 Sandbox) anti-ship missiles; 64 (8 x 8) S-300F Fort (SA-N-6 Grumble) long-range surface-to-air missiles; 40 (2 × 20) OSA-M (SA-N-4 Gecko) SR SAM; Guns: 1 twin AK-130 130 mm/L70 dual purpose guns; 6 × 1 AK-630 close-in weapons systems; Torpedoes and others: 2 × 12 RBU-6000 anti-submarine mortars; 10 (2 x 5) 533 mm torpedo tubes
- Aircraft carried: 1 Kamov Ka-25 or Kamov Ka-27 helicopter
- Aviation facilities: Flight deck and hangar

The Russian cruiser Marshal Ustinov (Russian: Маршал Устинов), is a Slava-class cruiser (Project 1164) of the Russian Navy. The Russian name for the ship type is Raketnyy Kreyser (RKR), meaning "Missile Cruiser". The ship is named after Dmitriy Ustinov, a former Soviet Minister of Defence. Marshal Ustinov was assigned to the 43rd Missile Ship Division of the Northern Fleet, whose homeport is in Severomorsk. From 2012 to 2016, the cruiser underwent a major overhaul. The vessel returned to service in 2017 and has since been deployed to the Mediterranean Sea.

== Description ==
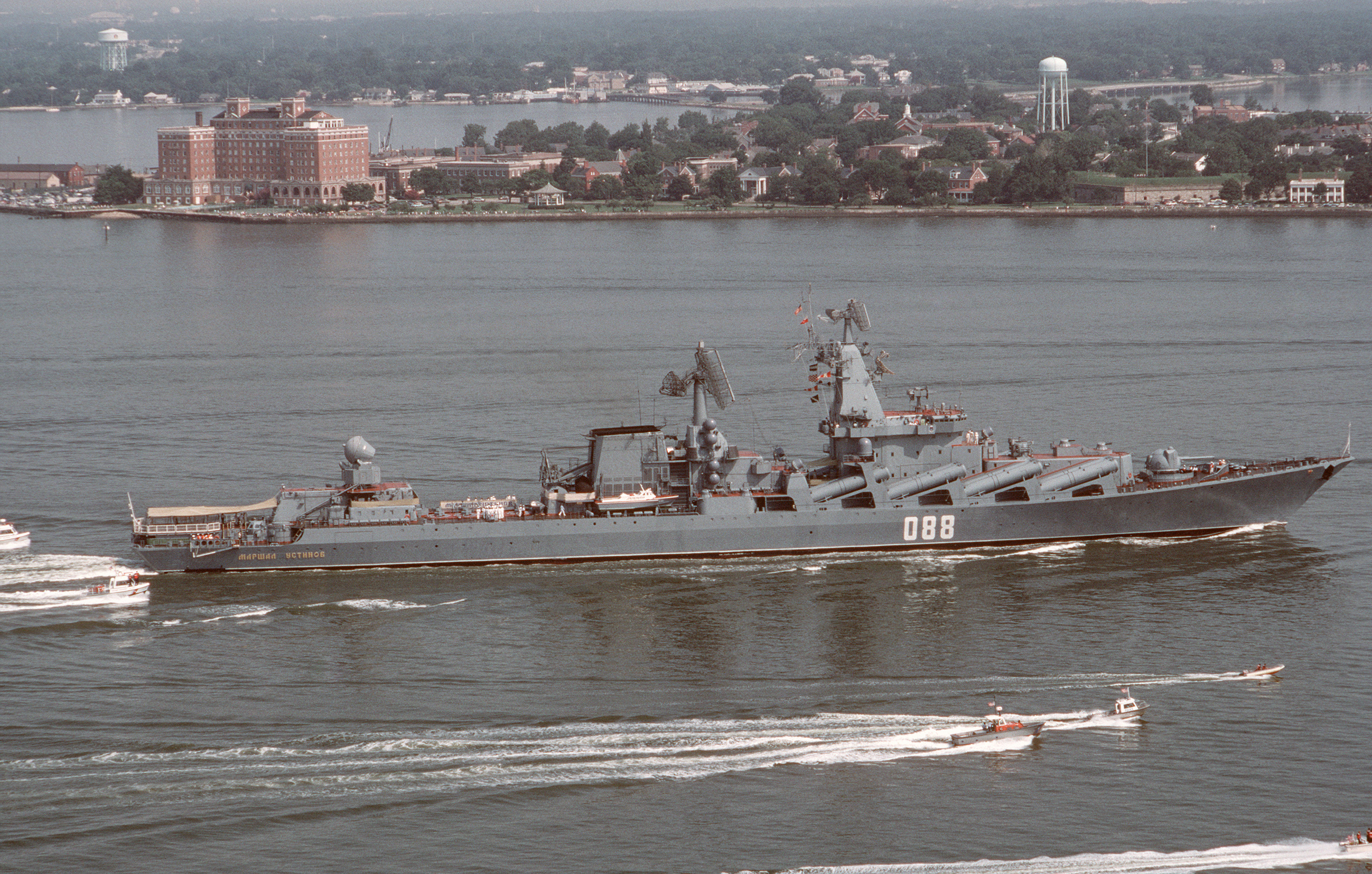
Marshal Ustinov leaving Norfolk, Virginia in 1989

Marshal Ustinov is a Slava-class cruiser designed during the Soviet Union as a Raketnyy Kreyser or "anti-ship rocket cruiser (RKR)." As originally constructed the vessel had a standard displacement of 10,000 tonnes (10,000 long tons) and 12,700 t (12,500 long tons) at full load. By 2009, this had decreased to 9,530 t (9,380 long tons) standard and 11,670 tonnes (11,490 long tons) at full load. The cruiser measures 186.4 metres (611 ft 7 in) long with a beam of 20.8 m (68 ft 3 in) and a draught of 8.4 m (27 ft 7 in). The vessel is powered by a combined gas or gas (COGOG) system comprising four 23,300 kilowatts (31,250 shp) boost gas turbines and two 8,900 kW (12,000 shp) cruise gas turbines driving two shafts for a combined 93,000 kW (125,000 shp). This gives the cruiser a maximum speed of 34 knots (63 km/h; 39 mph) and a range of 9,000 nautical miles (17,000 km; 10,000 mi) at 15 knots (28 km/h; 17 mph). As built the cruiser had a complement of 505. This was later reduced to 476 including 62 officers.

Marshal Ustinov when constructed was armed with sixteen P-500 Bazalt (SS-N-12 Sandbox) anti-ship missiles (SSM) in two eight-missile launchers located amidships to either side of the superstructure. The cruiser is also equipped with 64 S-300F Fort (SA-N-6 Grumble) long-range surface-to-air missiles (SAM) in eight eight-missile launchers located aft of the funnel and four OSA-M (SA-N-4 Gecko) SR SAMs in two twenty-round launchers located aft, to either side of the hangar. Marshal Ustinov is also armed with twin-mounted AK-130 130 mm (5 in)/L70 dual purpose guns located forward and six AK-630 30 mm (1.2 in) close-in weapons systems with two located forward atop the superstructure and four located amidships to either side of the superstructure. For anti-submarine warfare (ASW), the cruiser mounts two RBU-6000 anti-submarine mortars, each with six barrels and ten 533 mm (21 in) torpedo tubes two quintuple launchers behind shutters near the stern.

The ship was equipped with MR-800 Voskhod/Top Pair 3-D long range air search and MR-700 Fregat/Top Steer air/surface search radar. For ASW, the cruiser is equipped with MG-332 Tigan-2T/Bull Nose hull-mounted LF and Platina/Horse Tail MF VDS sonar. Marshal Ustinov mounts MR-184/Kite Screech fire control radar for the 130 mm guns, 3R41 Volna/Top Dome radar for SA-N-6 SAM control, MPZ-301 Baza/Pop Group radar for SA-N-4 SAM control and Argument/Front Door-C radar for SSM control and 3 Bass Tilt radars for the AK-630s. The cruiser also utilises the Punch Bowl satellite link for its weapon targeting systems. For electronic warfare, the ship is supplied with the Kol'cho suite with Gurzhor-A&B/Side Globe intercept and MR-404/Rum Tub jammers. The vessel mounts two PK2 chaff launchers. The single Top Dome radar only has a 180° arc and presents a blind spot forward for the SA-N-6 missiles.

The cruiser has a flight deck over the stern and a hangar. The cruiser can utilise either one Kamov Ka-25 or Kamov Ka-27 helicopter. The hangar is one-half deck below the flight deck and is reached via an inclined ramp. The helicopter is maneuvered using a chain-haul system. The helicopter can provide over-the-horizon targeting for Marshal Ustinov's weapon systems.

== Construction and career ==
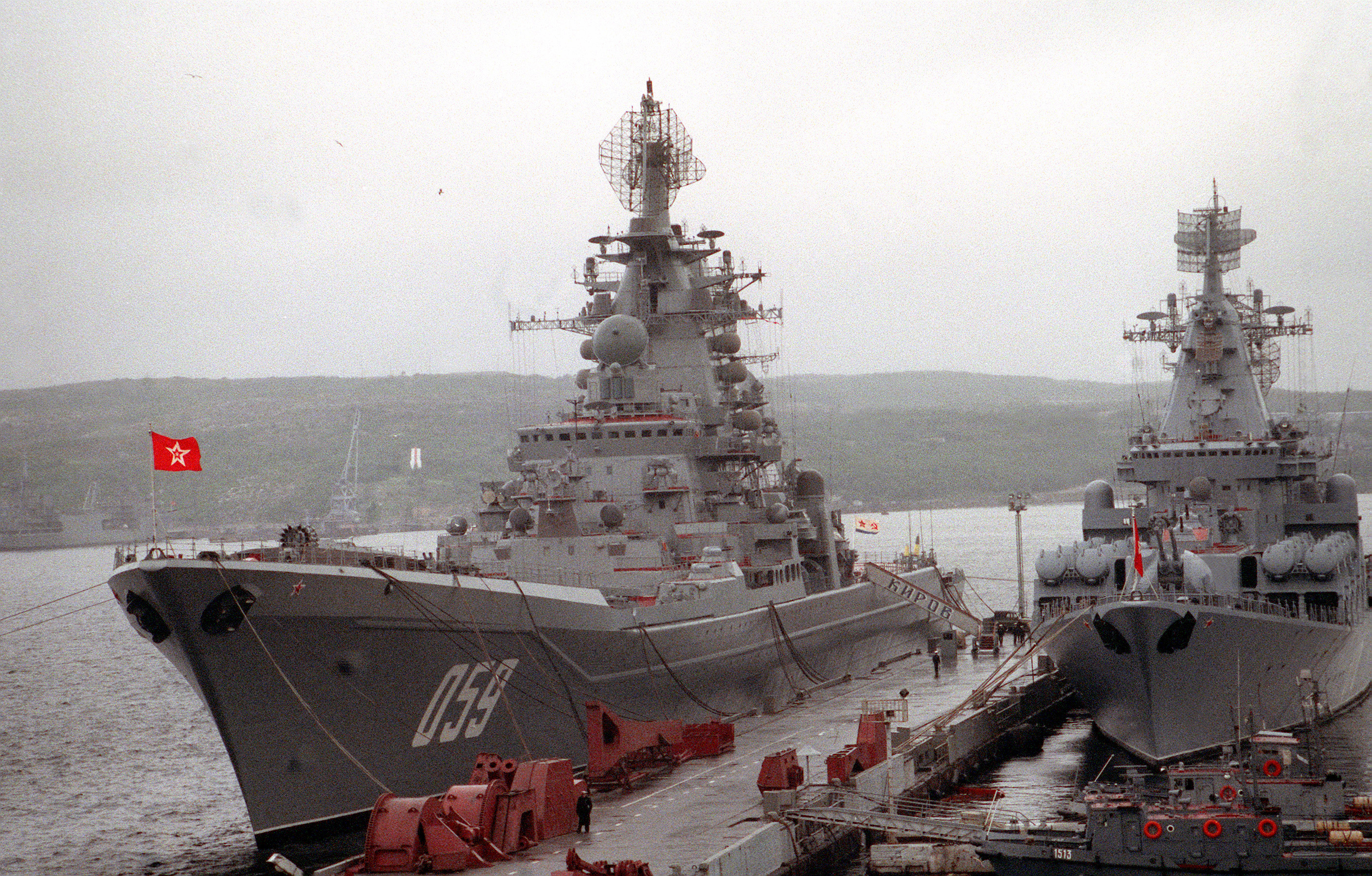
Marshal Ustinov on the right next to Admiral Ushakov at Severomorsk in 1992

Hull number 070 was laid down at the 61 Kommuna#445 Yard, Mykolaiv on 5 October 1978 as the second Slava-class ship initially named Admiral Lobov. The cruiser was launched on 25 February 1982 and commissioned in the Northern Fleet as the renamed Marshal Ustinov on 15 September 1986. Beginning in March 1987, the cruiser began operations with the fleet. Marshal Ustinov has been known to carry two other hull numbers than her original (070); 088 and 055. From December 1987 to June 1988, she performed the tasks of military service in the Mediterranean Sea.

In 1989 Marshal Ustinov was deployed to the Mediterranean Sea again. Between 22 and 26 July 1989 the cruiser, along with the oiler Genrik Gasanov and the destroyer Otlichnyy, paid an official visit to the naval base of Norfolk, Virginia, United States. This marked only the second time Soviet warships had made a visit to the United States since World War II. On 4 January 1991 Marshal Ustinov started a patrol duty in the Mediterranean Sea. Between 16 and 20 July 1991 the cruiser paid a visit to the naval base of Mayport, Florida, United States. Marshal Ustinov was accompanied by the oiler Dnestr and the destroyer Simferopol. This marked the third time Soviet warships had visited the United States since the end of the Cold War. Between 30 June and 5 July 1993 she paid a visit to Halifax, Nova Scotia, Canada alongside the destroyer Admiral Kharlamov.

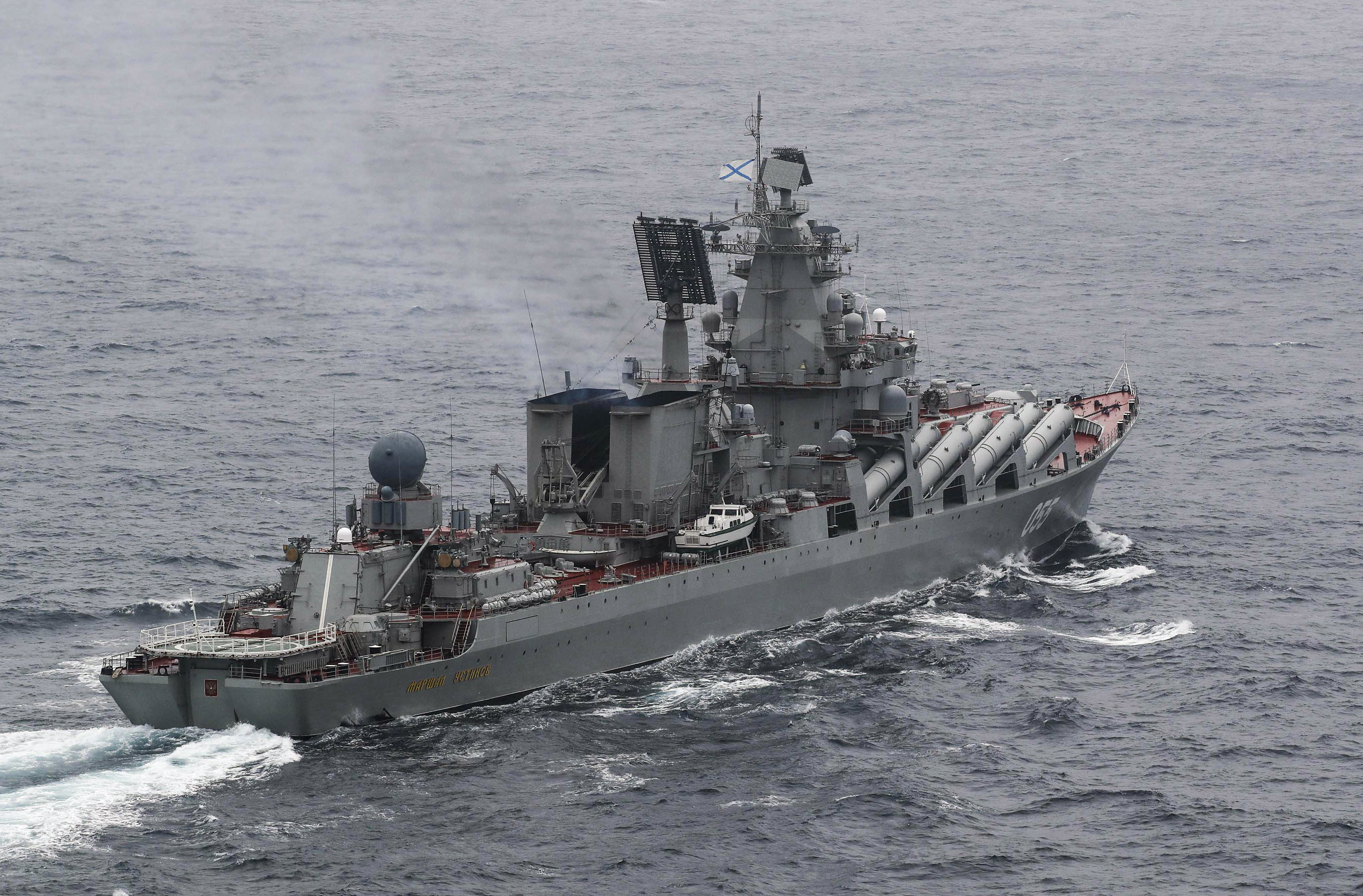
Stern view in 2018, after modernisation

In 1994, then commissioned in the Northern Fleet, Marshal Ustinov was laid up at the Severnaya Verf shipyard in St. Petersburg awaiting extensive repairs. The refit was completed in May 1995. In December 1996, the People's Republic of China purchased two Sovremenny-class destroyers and the income from this sale made it possible to pay for the $US169 million repairs to Marshal Ustinov. Marshal Ustinov remained in St. Petersburg until 1998 when the cruiser returned to the Northern Fleet.

From 21 September to 22 October 2004 Marshal Ustinov took part in a long voyage of the carrier strike group of the Northern Fleet to the north-eastern part of the Atlantic. Beginning on 17 July 2008 the cruiser patrolled the waters of the Arctic Ocean around Spitsbergen, replacing the destroyer Severomorsk.

In March 2011 it was reported that Marshal Ustinov could be transferred to the Russian Pacific Fleet. In 2011, it was decided to give the cruiser a moderate overhaul. However, in 2012, the navy decided to completely rework the cruiser. In 2012 the cruiser was laid up for repairs and upgrades at the Zvyozdochka Shipyard. The refit comprised repairs to ship's hull structures, propeller-steering group mechanisms, main power plant, and general systems. The electronic weapons systems were upgraded with digital devices. It was during this refit that the P-500 Bazalt missiles were upgraded to the modernized P-1000 Vulkan missiles. The ship rejoined the navy in 2016, and returned to active service in April 2017.

On 12 May 2017, Marshal Ustinov, with cruise missiles on board, went on exercises in the Barents Sea. On 4 July 2017, together with the destroyer Vice-Admiral Kulakov, Marshal Ustinov sailed from Severomorsk to the Baltic Sea and on 29 July she took part in the Main Naval Parade in St. Petersburg in honor of the Navy Day. On 5 December 2017, the cruiser completed combat training missions in training ranges in the Barents Sea to repulse conventional air attacks of Sukhoi Su-33 fighters.

Between 11 August and 12 November 2018, Marshal Ustinov was deployed to the Mediterranean Sea for the fourth time after 1988, 1989 and 1991 deployments.

On 3 July 2019, Marshal Ustinov left Severomorsk to participate in the Main Naval Parade in St. Petersburg before joining the Russian Navy exercise "Ocean Shield-2019" in the Baltic Sea and on 22 August, entered the waters of the Mediterranean Sea. There, she visited ports in Algeria, Egypt, Turkey, Greece and Cyprus. Marshal Ustinov afterwards transited Gibraltar again and sailed into the Atlantic. On its way to South Africa, the cruiser paid a port visit to Equatorial Guinea. This was only a third time after the Cold War that a Russian cruiser entered the South Atlantic, the first two being Pyotr Veliky in 2008/2009 and Moskva in 2015. Between 25 and 30 November Marshal Ustinov participated in joint naval drills with South Africa and China. After the drills she transited Gibraltar. On 6 January 2020 it was reported that the cruiser will be deployed off Syria due to the danger of an Iran-US war in order to provide protection for the Russian troops in Syria and to ensure stability in the region. She returned to the homeport Severomorsk in February 2020, ending the 7-month deployment. Afterwards, she held drills in the Barents Sea in May, June and July 2020.

In February 2021, Marshal Ustinov took part in the large-scale exercises in the Barents Sea. She entered the Barents Sea two times under the command of Captain 2nd Rank Andrey Krivoguzov. Other ships active in the area in January - February include destroyer Severomorsk, frigate Admiral Gorshkov with the tug Altay, nuclear submarine Severodvinsk, that launched a Kalibr missile, corvettes Aysberg, Snezhnogorsk, Yunga and Brest and salvage vessel Georgiy Titov with deep-submergence rescue vehicle AS-34. On 22 February, the same day as US bombers landed in Norway for the first time, Marshal Ustinov sailed in Varanger fjord in the area of Russia-Norway maritime border, becoming the first Russian warship to do so in the post-Cold War era. She entered the Barents Sea again on 4 March.

On 1 June, the ship participated in drills in the Barents Sea along with Pyotr Velikiy. Afterwards, the ship embarked on a journey towards the Baltic Sea in order to participate in the Naval Parade in St. Petersburg, along with destroyer Vice-Admiral Kulakov, landing ship Pyotr Morgunov, tug Altay and nuclear submarines Orel, Knyaz Vladimir and Vepr.

On 7 February 2022, the cruiser deployed to the Mediterranean along with destroyer Vice-Admiral Kulakov, frigate Admiral Kasatonov and tanker Vyazma. Her battle group linked-up with Varyag's deploying to the Mediterranean on 2 February 2022 from the Pacific along with destroyer Admiral Tributs and tanker Boris Butoma. The battle group left the Mediterranean on 24 August 2022, returning to her homeport Severomorsk, while Admiral Kasatonov stayed in the Mediterranean. Both battle groups have conducted exercises with naval bombers Tu-22M3 and MiG-31K, operating from airbase Khmeymim in Syria. Marshal Ustinov, Vice-Admiral Kulakov and Vyazma returned to Severomorsk on 15 September, after 236 days and 36,000 nautical miles travelled. They were accepted by the commander of the Northern Fleet admiral Aleksandr Moiseyev, who claimed that the presence of such ships in the distant sea zone is one of the deterrents, preventing the escalation of the situation, which is now critical.

The Ship remained active in both 2025 and 2026, engaging in exercises close to Norway.
