= Ukrainian cruiser Ukraina =

Unfinished Slava-class guided missile cruiser

Coordinates: 46.975271°N 32.003618°E

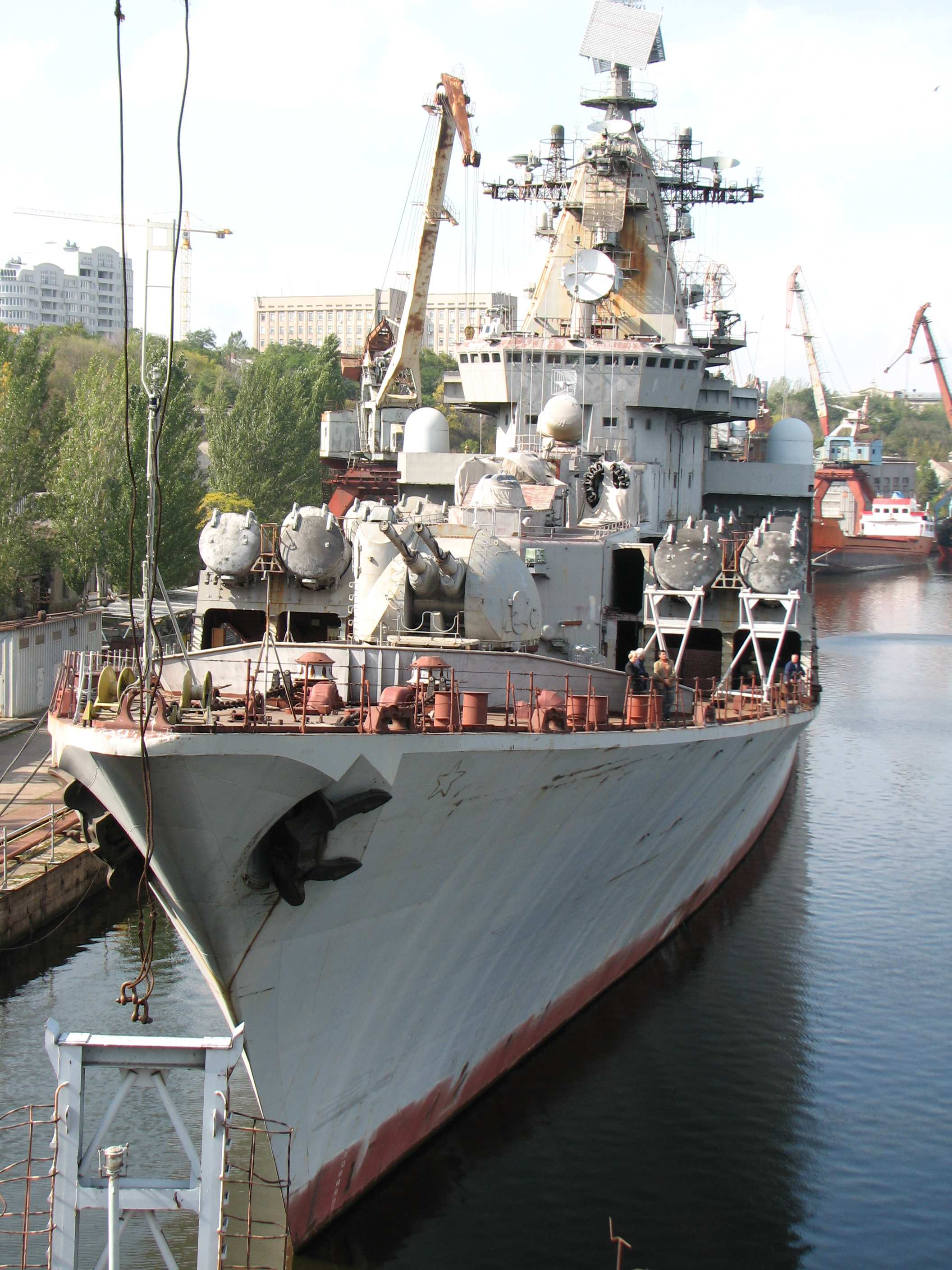
- Unfinished cruiser Ukraina at shipyard imeni 61 Kommunara in Mykolaiv, 2008

History

→ → Soviet Union → Russia → Ukraine
- Name: Ukraina, formerly Admiral Flota Lobov
- Namesake: Semyon Lobov; Ukraine
- Builder: 61 Kommunara Shipbuilding Plant (SY 445), Mykolaiv
- Laid down: 1983
- Launched: 1990
- Status: Docked unfinished in Mykolaiv
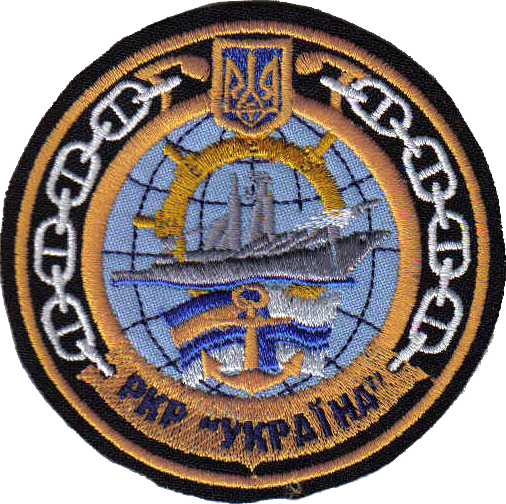
- Badge

General characteristics
- Class & type: Slava-class cruiser
- Displacement: 11,490 tons
- Length: 186.4 m (611 ft 7 in)
- Beam: 20.8 m (68 ft 3 in)
- Draft: 8.4 m (27 ft 7 in)
- Propulsion: 4 COGOG gas turbines, 2 shafts 90,000 kW (121,000 shp)
- Speed: 32 knots (59 km/h; 37 mph)
- Range: 7,000 nmi (13,000 km) at 16 knots (30 km/h; 18 mph)
- Complement: 480
- Sensors & processing systems: Voskhod MR-800 (Top Pair) 3D search radar; Fregat MR-710 (Top Steer) 3D search radar; Palm Frond navigation radar; Pop group SA-N-4 fire control radar; Top Dome SA-N-6 fire control radar; Bass Tilt AK-360 CIWS System fire control radar; Bull horn MF hull mounted sonar
- Electronic warfare & decoys: Rum Tub and Side Globe EW antennas; 2 × PK-2 DL (140mm chaff / flare)
- Armament: 16 × P-500 Bazalt (SS-N-12 Sandbox) anti-ship missiles; 8 × 8 (64) S-300PMU Favorit (SA-N-6 Grumble) long-range surface-to-air missiles; 2 × 20 (40) OSA-MA (SA-N-4 Gecko) SR SAM; 1 × twin AK-130 130 mm/L70 dual purpose guns; 6 × AK-630 close-in weapons systems; 2 × RBU-6000 anti-submarine mortars; 10 × (2 × 5) 533 mm torpedo tubes
- Armor: Splinter plating
- Aircraft carried: 1 Ka-25 or Ka-27 helicopter

Ukraina (Ukrainian: Україна) is a Ukrainian Slava-class cruiser originally ordered by the Soviet Union in the early 1980s under the name Admiral Flota Lobov (Russian: Адмирал Флота Лобов, "Fleet Admiral Lobov"). After the Soviet Union disbanded in the early 1990s, the ship passed on to Russia and then to Ukraine, assuming the name Ukraina. In 2010 the Ukrainian parliament stripped the ship of her name. The ship remains unfinished and is currently moored at the Mykolayiv Shipyard (former 61 Kommunara Shipbuilding Plant).

== History ==
The ship was laid down in 1983 and launched in 1990 just before the fall of the Soviet Union. Due to budget constraints, work on the cruiser had stopped in the late 1980s, and the ship was left unfinished. In 1993, the 90%-complete cruiser was withdrawn from the Russian Navy and passed to Ukraine where it was to be completed and commissioned in the Ukrainian Navy, but this plan was shortly abandoned. In 1997, Ukraine stated that it had no need for the cruiser and was willing to sell her. After Russia expressed no willingness to purchase the cruiser, China and India were approached as well but showed no interest either. In addition, the U.S. government has asked the Ukrainian government to stop supplying military technology to China in exchange for NATO accession and economic assistance. According to Ukrainian sources, in 2007, the cruiser needed 30 million dollars to be finished.

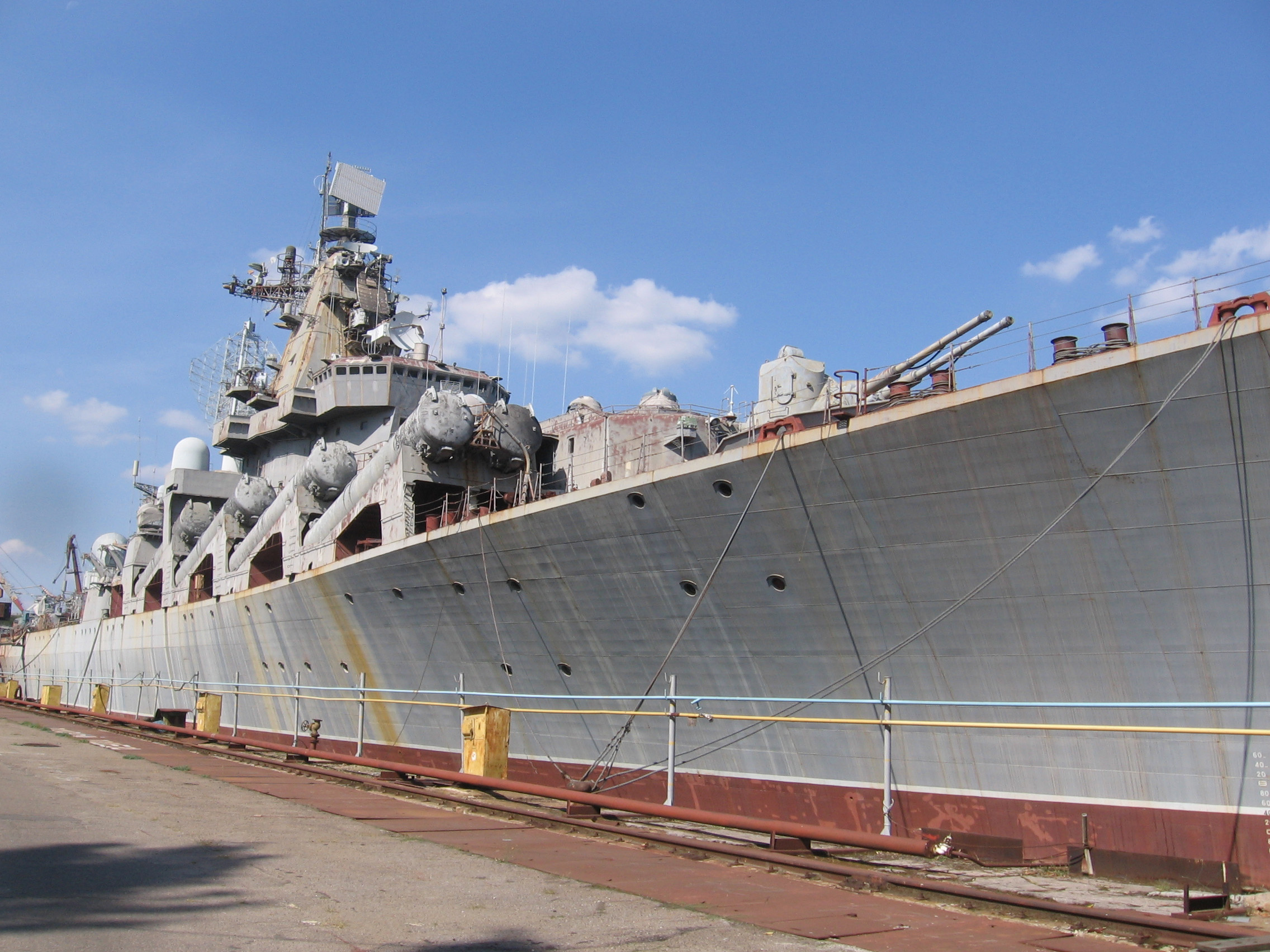

It was reported that the Ukrainian government invested ₴6.08 million into the ship's maintenance in 2012.

=== Possible sale to Russia ===
In April 2010, sources from the Russian defense committee claimed that Russia had plans to buy the unfinished cruiser from Ukraine. In May 2010, after talks with Russian president Dmitry Medvedev in Kyiv, Ukrainian president Viktor Yanukovych stated that they had come to an agreement to finish the ship together. On 21 January 2011, Russian navy sources stated that Russia was only interested in obtaining the cruiser if they could have her free of charge. By early March 2011, Russian defence minister Anatoly Serdyukov stated that Russia was still waiting for an acceptable offer from Ukraine, regarding potential procurement of the missile cruiser. His Ukrainian counterpart Mykhailo Yezhel responded that he would not scrap a 95% complete warship, and that the issue would be resolved in the near future. Instead, the Russian Navy was in favour of replacing its Soviet era Sovremenny and Udaloy-class destroyers, as well as Slava-class cruisers, with an enlarged variant of the Project 22350 frigate.

On 18 August 2018, it was reported that Brazil was interested in acquiring the ship, have her undergo extensive modernization, and transfer her to the Brazilian Navy.

=== Abandonment ===
On 26 March 2017, it was announced that the Ukrainian Government would be scrapping the vessel which has been laid up, incomplete, for nearly 30 years in Mykolaiv. Maintenance and construction were costing the country US$225,000 per month.

In 2019, it was announced that the ship would be scrapped due to its poor condition. In late 2019, the director of Ukroboronprom Aivaras Abromavičius indicated that a buyer to purchase the ship as scrap was underway. Progress largely halted in 2020, following the bankruptcy of the shipyard.

In 2023, the Ukrainian Minister of Defence Oleksiy Reznikov suggested that the ship be turned into a museum ship, due to it being the same class of ship as the ill-fated cruiser Moskva. This was later also suggested by the Governor of Mykolaiv Oblast Vitalii Kim.

As of late 2023, the ship remained in a semi-abandoned state. The ship is supported by a small skeleton crew, despite the bankruptcy and largely abandoned state of the shipyard. With the ship being docked, it retains a limited ability in regard to its electrical systems being connected to shore power, enabling segments of the ship to still be lit.

In January 2025, Russian state media RIA Novosti alleged that NATO affiliated personnel had increasingly begun to visit the ship for examination. In March, pro-Russian sources alleged that NATO specialists had begun to retrieve information in the form of documents and equipment from the derelict Mykolayiv Shipyard, with particular attention given to the cruiser.
