= Slava-class cruiser =

Russian/Soviet guided missile cruisers

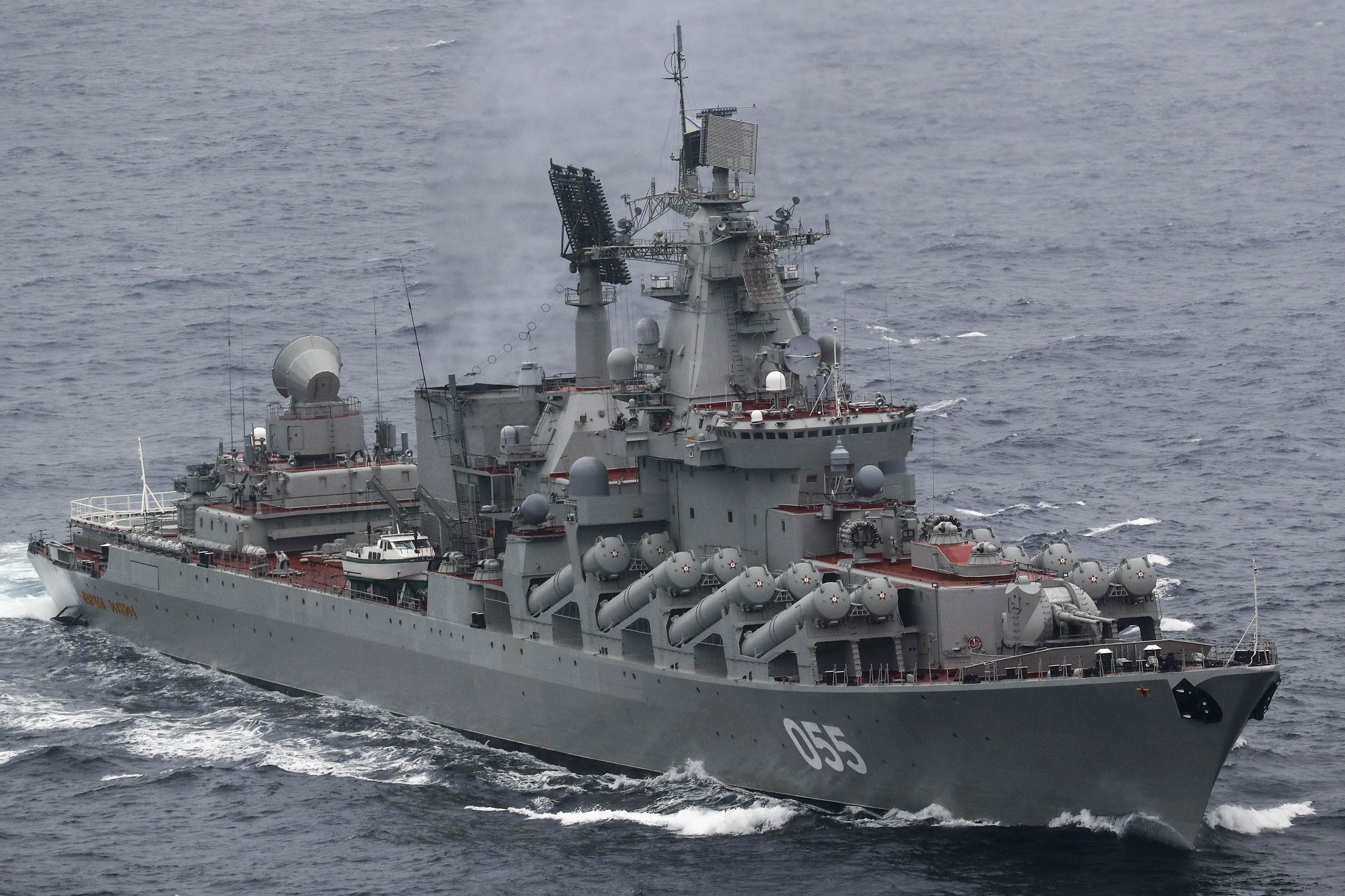
- Marshal Ustinov underway

Class overview
- Name: Slava class
- Builders: 61 Communards Shipyard, Mykolaiv
- Operators: Soviet Navy; Russian Navy; Ukrainian Navy (laid up & uncompleted)
- Preceded by: Kara class
- Succeeded by: Lider class (theoretical)
- Built: 1976–1990
- In service: 1982–present
- Planned: 10
- Completed: 3
- Canceled: 6
- Active: 2
- Laid up: 1 (construction incomplete)
- Lost: 1

General characteristics
- Type: Guided-missile cruiser
- Displacement: 9,380 tons standard; 11,490 tons full load
- Length: 186.4 m (611 ft 7 in)
- Beam: 20.8 m (68 ft 3 in)
- Draught: 8.4 m (27 ft 7 in)
- Installed power: 130,000 shp (97,000 kW)
- Propulsion: COGOG: GTU M21 2 × M70 cruise gas turbines and 4 × M90 boost gas turbines, 2 cruise steam turbines, 2 exhaust gas boilers, 4 × M8KF gas turbines, 2 shafts
- Speed: 32 knots (59 km/h; 37 mph)
- Range: 6,800 nmi (12,600 km; 7,800 mi) at 18 knots (33 km/h; 21 mph)
- Complement: 485 (66 Off, 419 WO/Enl), alternate information 476-529 (84 Off, 75 WO, 370 Enl)
- Sensors & processing systems: Radar: MR-800 Voshkod/Top Pair 3D long-range air search, MR-700 Fregat/Top Steer (first two) or MR-710 Fregat-MA/Top Plate (second two) 3D air search; Sonar: MG-332 Tigan-2T/Bull Nose hull mounted LF, Platina/Horse Tail MF VDS; Fire Control: 3R41 Volna/Top Dome SA-N-6 SAM control, MPZ-301 Baza/Pop Group SA-N-4 SAM control, Argument/Front Door-C SSM control
- Electronic warfare & decoys: Kol'cho suite with Gurzhor-A&B/Side Globe intercept, MR-404/Rum Tub jammers, Bell Crown intercept, Bell Push intercept, 2 PK-2 decoy RL, 12 PK-10 decoy RL (in last two units only)
- Armament: Missiles: 16 (8 × 2) P-1000 Vulcan (SS-N-12 Sandbox) anti-ship missiles; 64 (8 × 8) S-300F Fort (SA-N-6 Grumble) long-range surface-to-air missiles; 40 (2 × 20) OSA-M (SA-N-4 Gecko) SR SAM; Guns: 1 × twin AK-130 130 mm/L70 dual purpose guns; 6 × 1 AK-630 close-in weapons systems; Torpedoes and others: 2 × 12 RBU-6000 anti-submarine mortars; 10 (2 × 5) 533 mm torpedo tubes
- Armor: Splinter plating
- Aircraft carried: 1 Kamov Ka-25 or Kamov Ka-27 Helicopter

The Slava class, Soviet designation Project 1164 Atlant (Russian: Атлант, romanized: Atlant, lit. 'Atlas'), is a class of guided-missile cruisers designed and constructed in the Soviet Union for the Soviet Navy, and currently operated by the Russian Navy.

All ships were built and planned to be built at the Shipyard named after 61 Communards in Mykolaiv, Ukrainian SSR.

== Development ==
The design started in the late 1960s, based around use of the P-500 Bazalt missile. The cruiser was intended as a less expensive conventionally powered alternative to the nuclear-powered Kirov-class battlecruisers. All are now armed with P-1000 Vulkan AShM missiles, developed in the late 1970s to late 1980s. There was a long delay in this programme, while the problems with the Bazalt were resolved.

These ships acted as flagships for numerous task forces. All ships were built at the 61 Kommunar yard in Mykolaiv (Nikolaev), Ukrainian SSR. The class was a follow-up to the Kara-class cruiser, which the Soviet Navy typed as a Large Anti-submarine Ship (Russ. BPK), constructed at the same shipyard and appears to be built on a stretched version of the Kara-class hull.

The Slava class was initially designated BLACKCOM 1 (Black Sea Combatant 1) and then designated the Krasina class for a short period until Slava was observed at sea. The SS-N-12 launchers are fixed facing forward at around 8° elevation with no reloads available. As there was nothing revolutionary about the design of the class, western observers felt they were created as a hedge against the failure of the more radical Kirov class. The helicopter hangar deck is located a half deck below the landing pad with a ramp connecting the two.

Originally ten ships were planned, but with the collapse of the Soviet Union, only three were completed. A fourth vessel was launched, but final construction remains incomplete, and the ship has not been commissioned into service.

After the dissolution of the Soviet Union, the three finished ships commenced service in the Russian Navy, while the uncompleted fourth vessel, renamed Ukraina, had its ownership transferred to Ukraine. Efforts have been made to complete and update the unfinished ship. In 2010, Ukrainian president Viktor Yanukovych stated that Russia and Ukraine would work together on the project.

Russia has also expressed interest in purchasing the vessel, which Ukraine had previously offered for sale. However, as of early 2011, no final agreement had been concluded between the two countries.

The Russian Navy had plans to extensively upgrade all of their Slava-class vessels during the 2010s; completing work on Ukraina may have served as a test-bed for this. As of April 2022, the fourth hull remains afloat at a Ukrainian shipyard, uncompleted.

== Service history ==
One of the vessels, Moskva, sank in the Black Sea on 13 April 2022 following an explosion during the Russian invasion of Ukraine. Ukrainian military officials claimed this was the result of a Neptune missile strike by Ukraine, while Russian military officials claimed the vessel suffered an explosion to its ammunition depot and sank while being towed to port.

== Gallery ==
1) AK-130, 2) P-500 Bazalt, 3) RBU-6000, 4) AK-630, 5) S-300, 6) OSA-MA

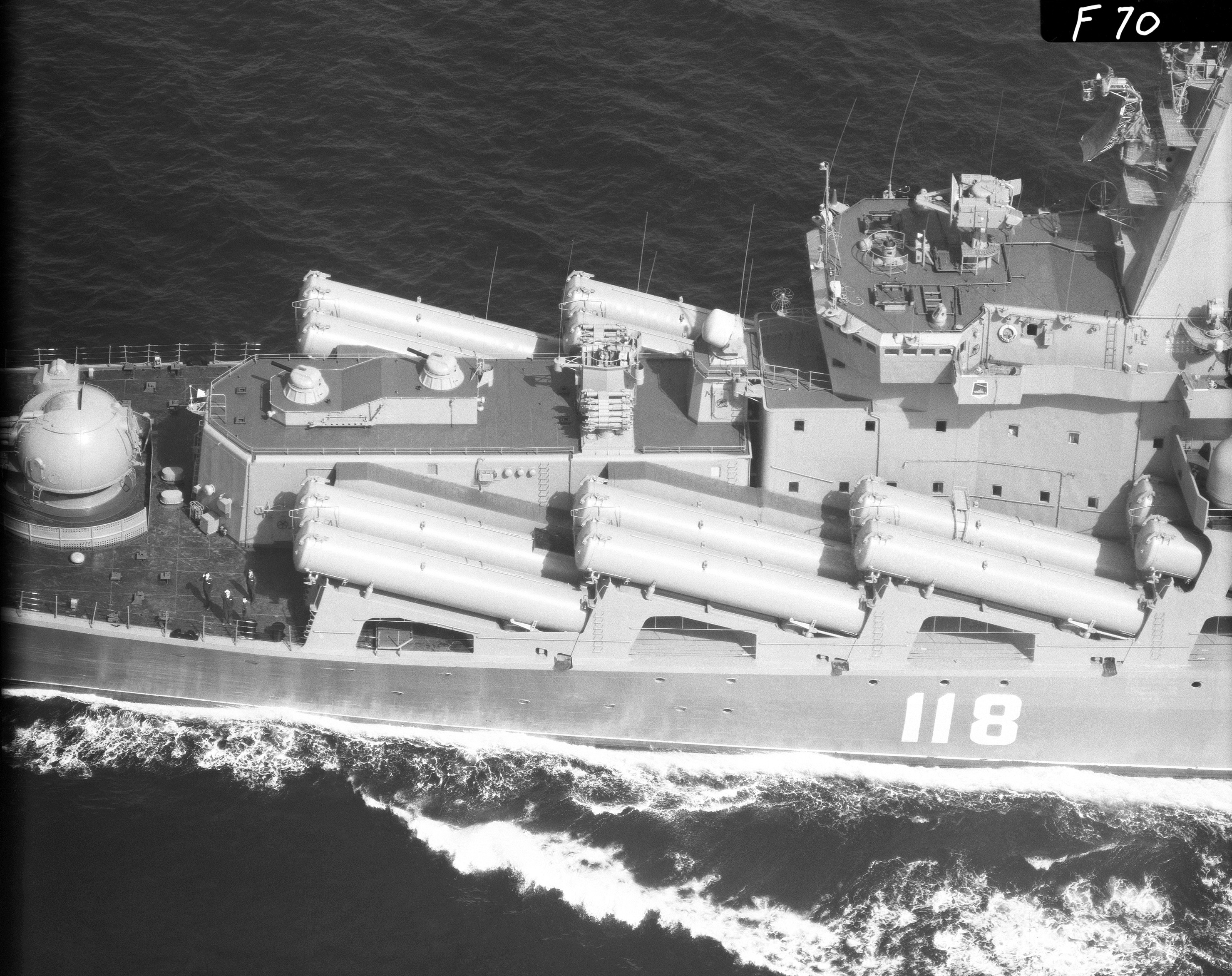
Placement of P-500 Bazalt (SS-N-12 Sandbox) launchers on the Slava class.

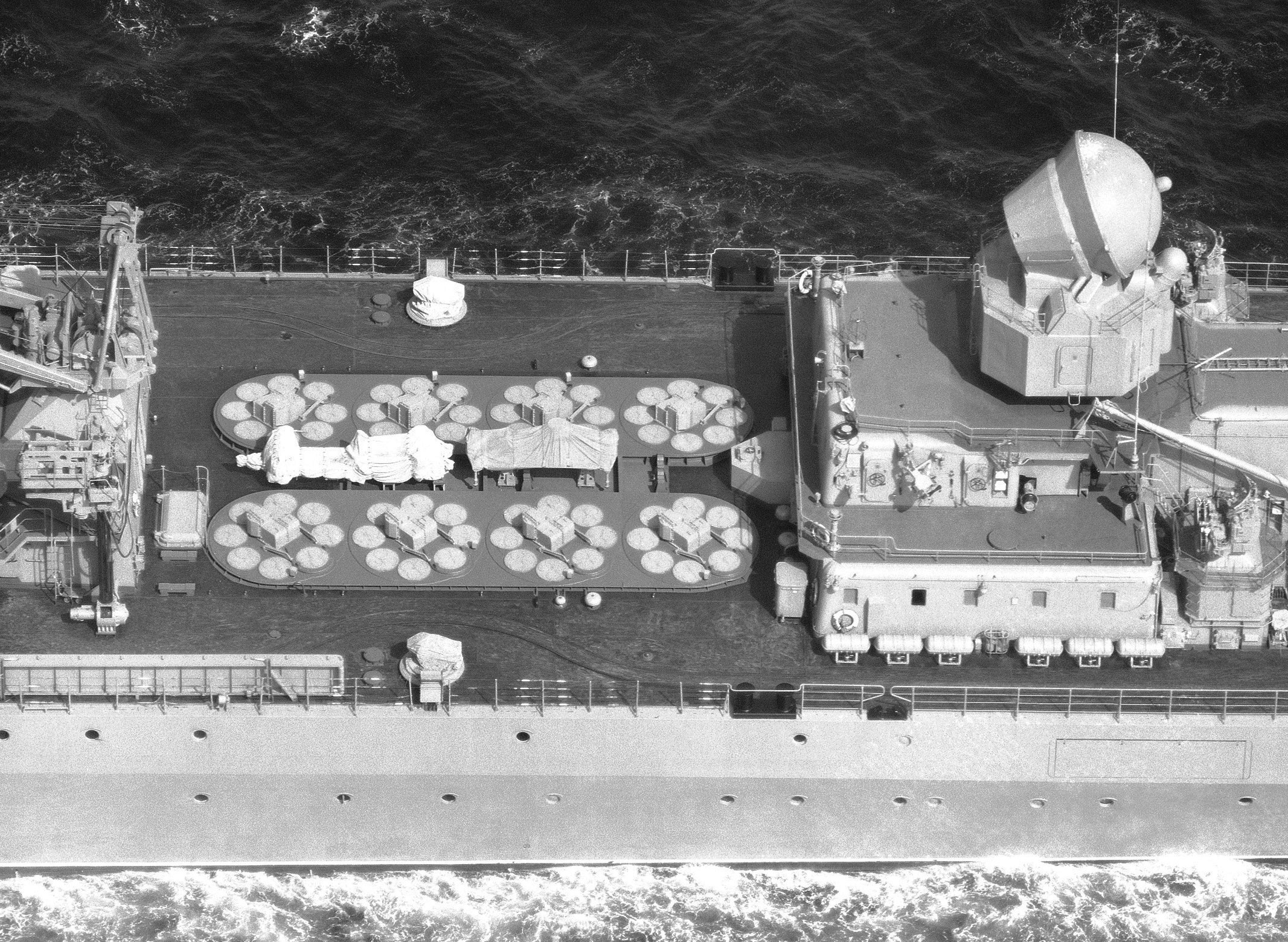
A close up view of SA-N-6 launchers with 3R41 Volna "Top Dome" fire control radar on Marshal Ustinov.

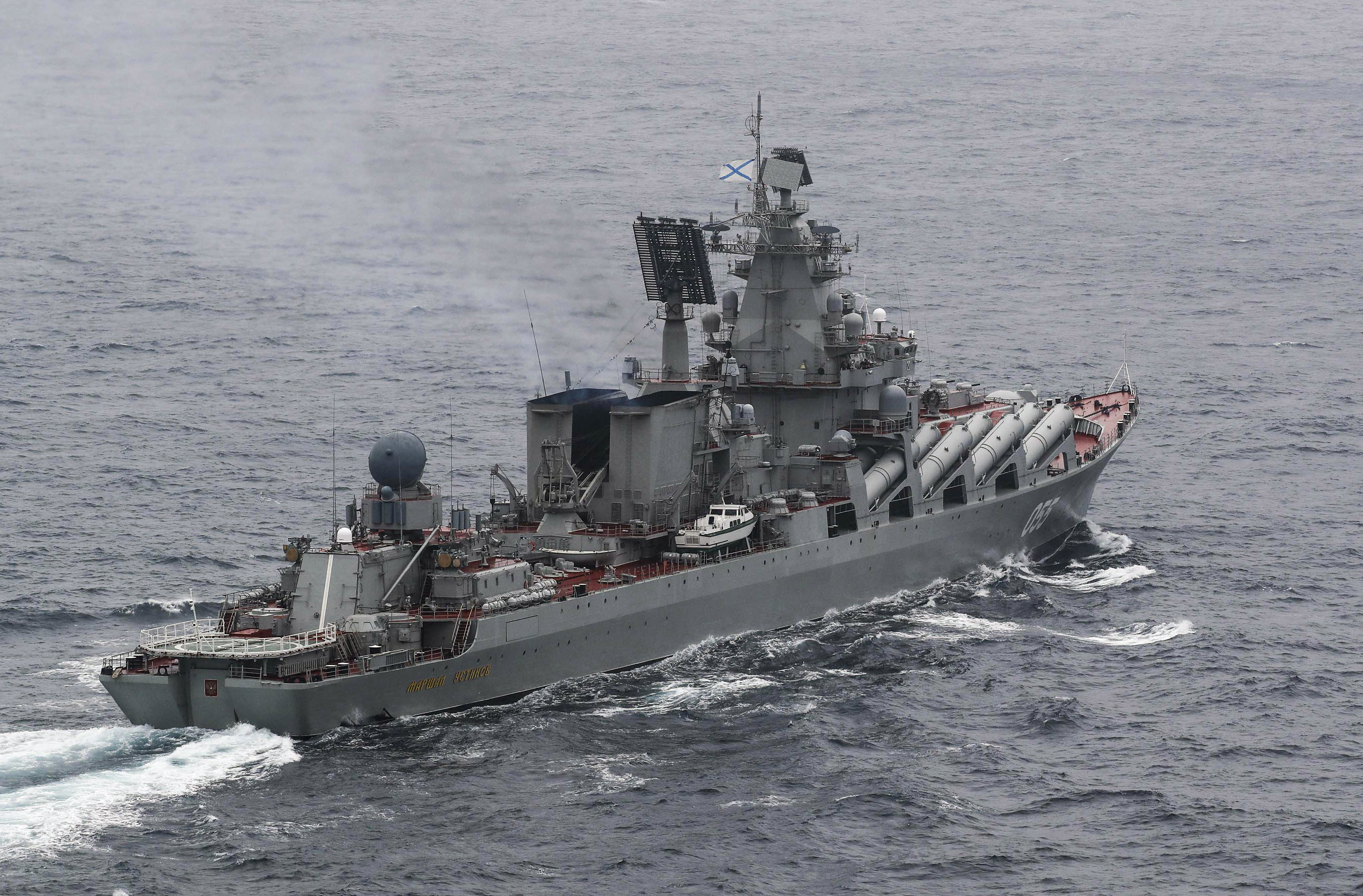
A stern view of Marshal Ustinov in 2018, after modernization

Video footage of Moskva during Russian military operations in Syria

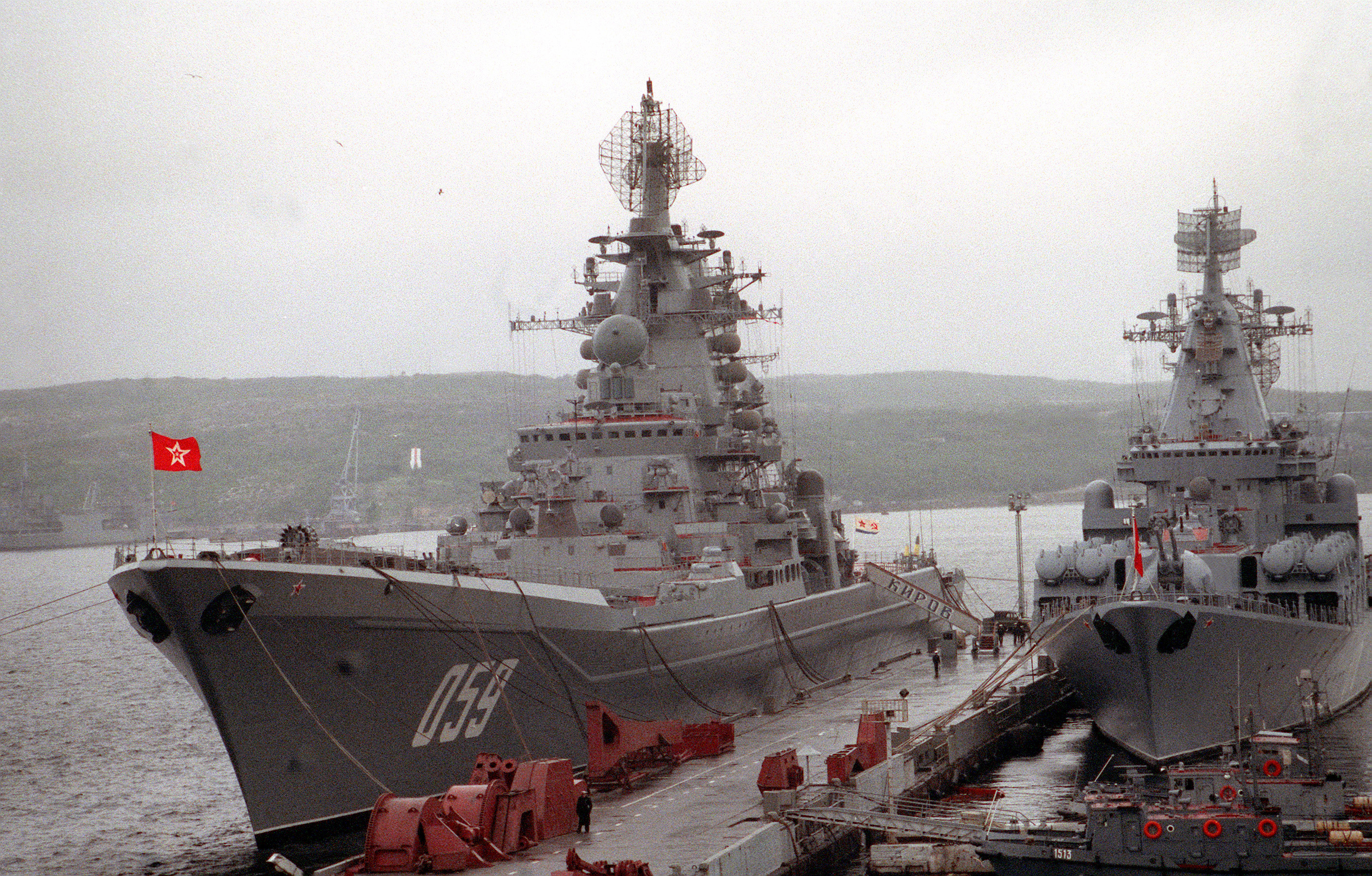
Marshal Ustinov (right) alongside the Kirov-class battlecruiser Kirov

== Ships ==
Name	Laid down	Launched	Commissioned	Status	Picture	Notes
Moskva (ex-Slava)	1976	1979	1982	Sunk on 14 April 2022		Overhauled from 1991 to 1998. Was involved in the 2008 South Ossetia war. In 2010 the vessel participated in military exercises in the Indian Ocean and Russia's Vostok 2010 military drills in the Sea of Okhotsk in July 2010. Sent to Syria in 2013. Sunk on 14 April 2022 during the 2022 Russian invasion of Ukraine.
Marshal Ustinov (ex-Admiral Flota Lobov)	1978	1982	1986	In service with the Northern Fleet		Overhaul completed in October 2016.
Varyag (ex-Chervona Ukraina)	1979	1983	1989	In service with the Pacific Fleet		Listed as under reduced manning since 2002. Operating with a caretaker crew at reduced readiness since arrival with the Soviet Pacific Fleet in 1990. Re-entered service in the Russian Pacific Fleet in early 2008 after an overhaul. In 2010, the Varyag visited San Francisco, California coincident with the visit of Russian President Dmitriy Medvedev to Silicon Valley during his trip to the U.S.
Ukraina (ex-Komsomolets, ex-Admiral Flota Lobov)	1983	1990		Unfinished		Moored unfinished in Mykolaiv, Ukraine.
Oktyabrskaya Revolutsiya	1988			Cancelled and disassembled on the way in 1990		
Admiral Flota Sovetskogo Soyuza Gorshkov	Planned for 1990			Cancelled		
Varyag				Cancelled		
Sevastopol				Cancelled		

== See also ==
- List of cruiser classes in service

Equivalent cruisers of the same era

- Ticonderoga class
