= Soviet aircraft carrier Kiev =

Kiev class Aircraft cruiser

Coordinates: 39°09′19″N 117°48′30″E

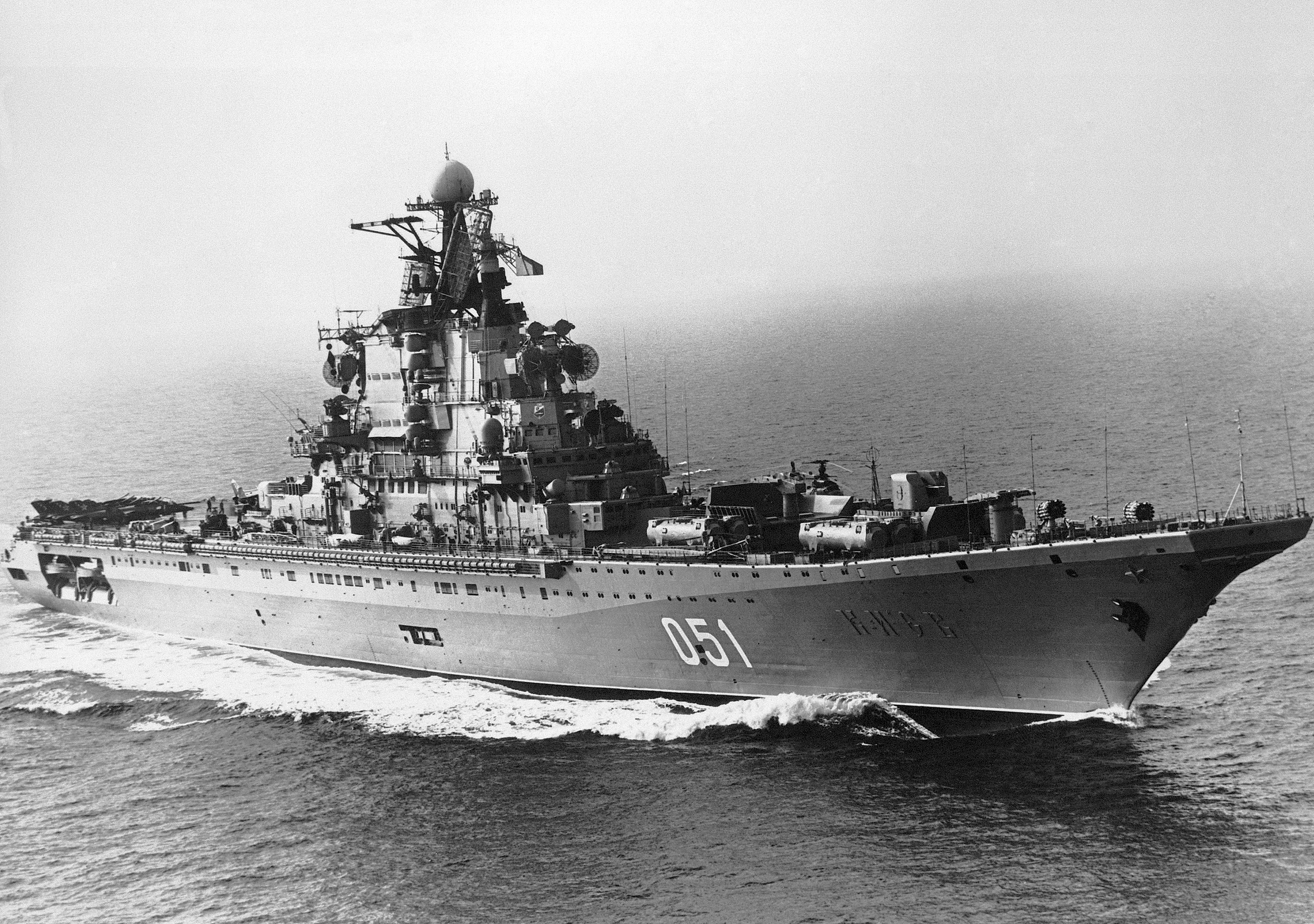
- Kiev underway, 1986

History

→ Soviet Union → Russia
- Name: Kiev
- Namesake: Kiev, Ukrainian SSR
- Builder: Chernomorskiy yard, Nikolayev, Ukrainian SSR
- Laid down: 21 July 1970
- Launched: 26 December 1972
- Commissioned: 28 December 1975
- Decommissioned: 30 June 1993
- Fate: Sold to a Chinese company in 1996. Theme park in Tianjin since 1 May 2004.

General characteristics
- Class & type: Kiev-class aircraft cruiser
- Displacement: 30,530 tons (standard); 41,370 tons (loaded)
- Length: 273.1 m (896 ft) o/a
- Beam: 49.2 m (161 ft) overall; 31 m (102 ft) at the waterline
- Draught: 8.95 m (29.4 ft)
- Installed power: 140,000 shp (100 MW)
- Propulsion: Four shaft geared steam turbines
- Speed: 32 kn (59 km/h; 37 mph)
- Range: 13,500 nmi (25,000 km; 15,500 mi) at 18 kn (33 km/h; 21 mph)
- Complement: 1,612 ship's crew; 430 air group
- Armament: 4 × twin SS-N-12 Sandbox SSM launchers (8 missiles); 2 × twin SA-N-3 Shtorm SAM launchers (72 missiles); 2 × twin SA-N-4 Gecko SAM launchers (40 missiles); 2 × twin 76 mm guns; 8 × AK-630 30 mm CIWS; 10 × 533 mm torpedo tubes; 1 × twin SUW-N-1 ASW rocket launcher (16 nuclear-tipped rockets); 2 × RBU-6000 anti-submarine rocket launchers
- Aircraft carried: 32 (total); 12 Yak-38M fighter aircraft; 20 Kamov Ka-25 or Kamov Ka-27 helicopters

Kiev (Russian: Киев) is an aircraft carrier (heavy aircraft cruiser in Russian classification) that served the Soviet Navy and the Russian Navy from 1975 to 1993. She was built between 1970 and 1975 at Chernomorski factory in Mykolaiv and was the first Kiev-class vessel to be built. She is currently part of a theme park in China.

== Service life ==
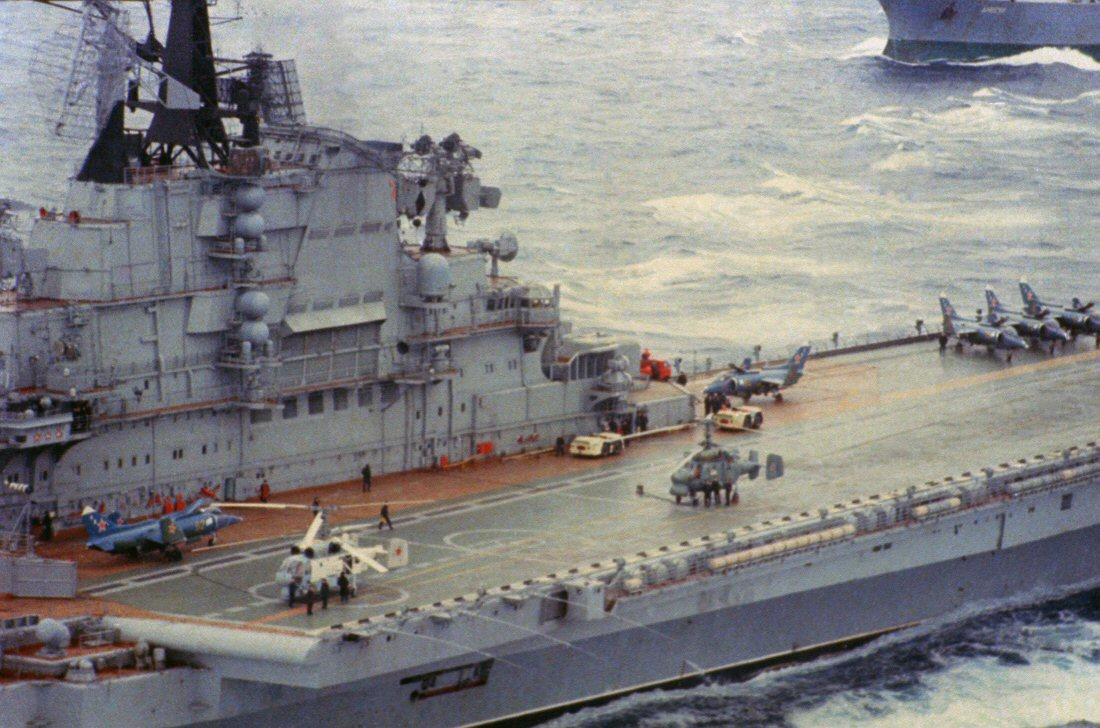
Ka-27 Helix and Ka-25 Hormone helicopters and Yak-38 Forger VTOL aircraft are parked on the flight deck. 6 Jan 1988

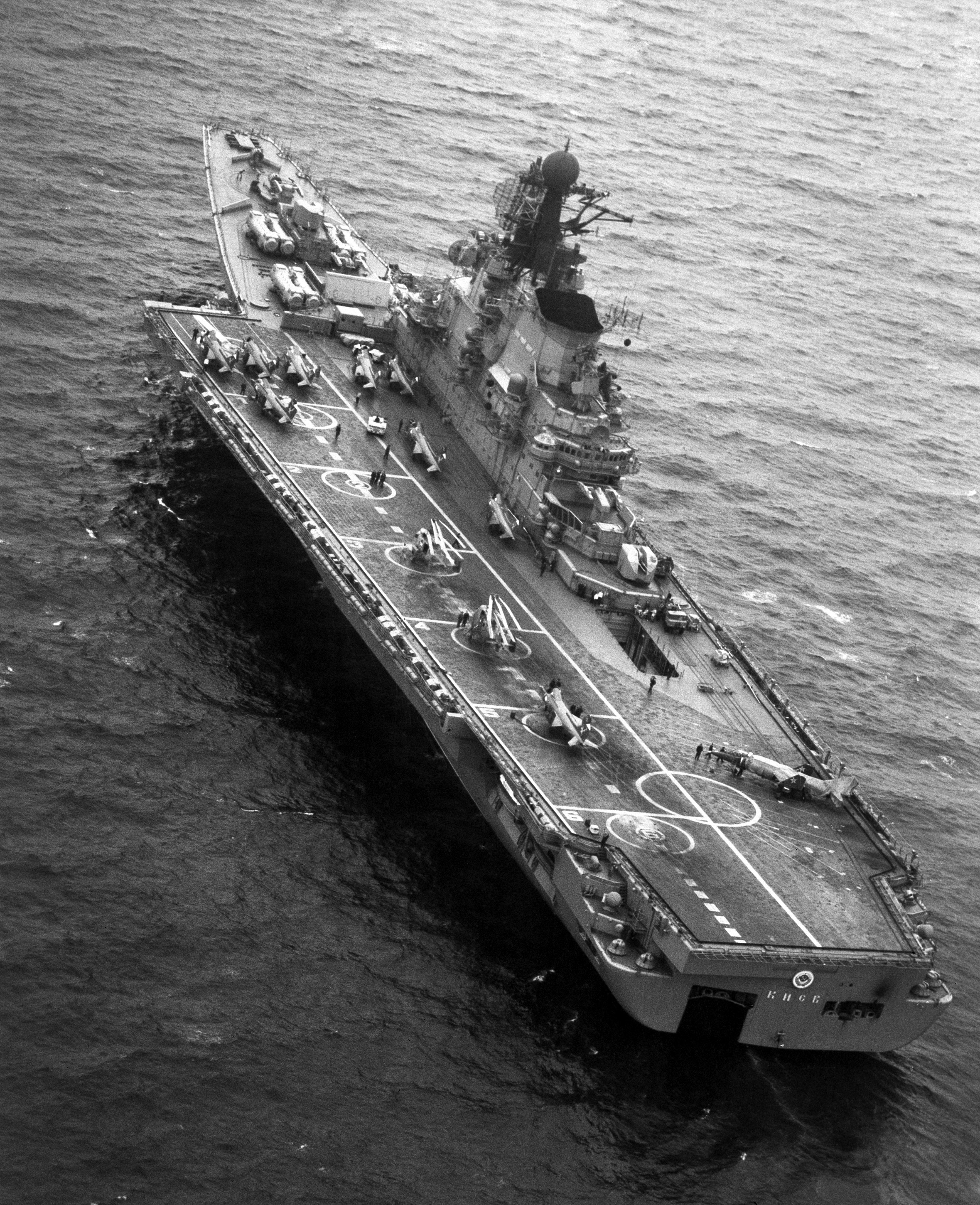
Aircraft carrier Kiev, USSR, 1985

Kiev was laid down on 21 July 1970 and launched on 26 December 1972. She was completed and commissioned on 28 December 1975, but officially entered service only in February 1977, after completing all trials.

On 16 July 1976 she sailed from Sevastopol in the Black Sea, and on 20 July began testing her Yakovlev Yak-36M aircraft (four Yak-36M and one Yak-36MU on board) under sea conditions in the Mediterranean off Crete. On 10 August 1976 she arrived in Severomorsk, Murmansk Oblast, and was attached to the Northern Fleet's 170th Anti-Submarine Warfare Brigade, and conducted extensive tests up to December. Between 12 and 19 April 1977 she took part in the Sever-77 exercise, and on 26 June 1977 was reclassified from Protivolodochnyye Kreysery (PKR) "ASW cruiser" to Tyazhelyye Avianesushchiye Kreysery (TAVKR) "Heavy aircraft carrying cruiser". Between 20 December 1977 and 21 April 1978 she participated in operations in the Atlantic Ocean and the Mediterranean. On 3 November 1978 she hit a sand bar, but suffered no damage. She took part in a local exercise on 4 August 1978, and on 11 October in final tests of the main missiles in the White Sea.

From 1977 to 1987, Kiev undertook 10 practice voyages to the Atlantic and Mediterranean Sea. In March 1979 she undertook manoeuvres with her sister ship Minsk on the Mediterranean. In October 1981 she was a flagship in the massive fleet exercise Zapad-81 on the Baltic Sea. From December 1982 to November 1984 she underwent an overhaul and modernization in Mykolaiv. From 1985, the practice of operating Yakovlev Yak-38s in STOL mode instead of VTOL was introduced, allowing an increase in aircraft payload and range, and a replacement of Kamov Ka-25 helicopters with Kamov Ka-27 started. In 1985 Kiev went back to the Northern Fleet. From 1987 she mainly stayed in Severomorsk. In December 1989 she was moved to reserve. After the disintegration of the USSR, the ship was taken by Russia. Due to a low military budget and worsening ship's condition, she was retired on 30 June 1993.

== Post-service life ==
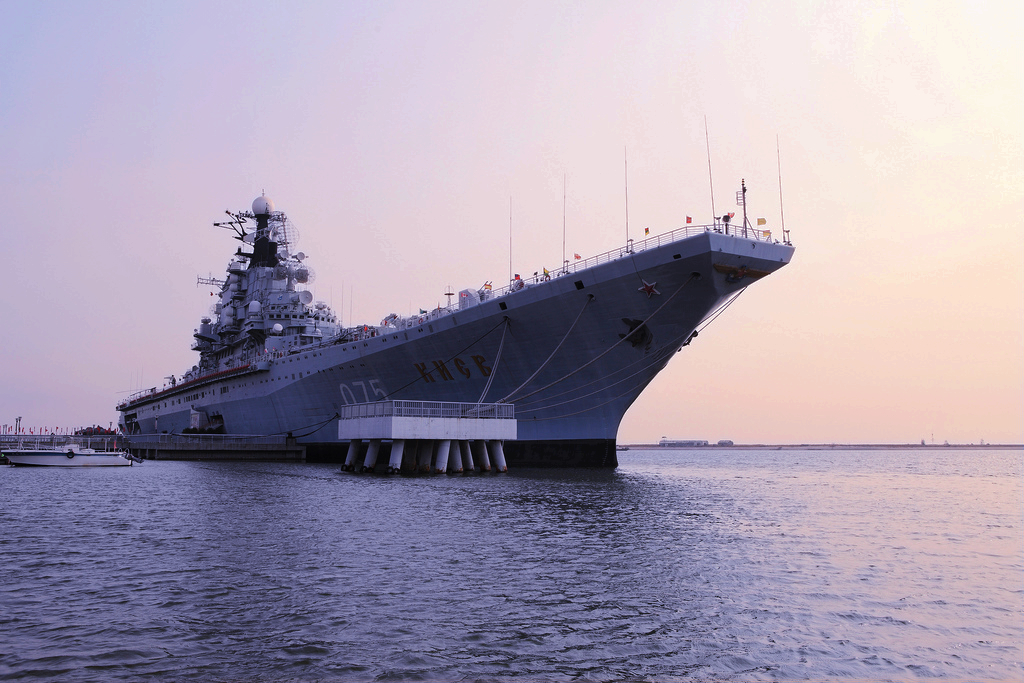
Ex-Kiev at the Tianjin Binhai theme park in February 2010

In 1996 Kiev was sold to Binhai Aircraft Park, a theme park in Tianjin, China. The concept was developed by world tourism and attraction consultant Leisure Quest International.

In August 2011, ex-Kiev was developed into a luxury hotel after renovations costing £9.6 million.

== See also ==
- Kiev-class aircraft carrier
- List of aircraft carriers

== Notes and references ==
- Заблоцкий, В.П. (V.P. Zablotskiy) (July 2003). "Тяжелый авианесущий крейсер "Киев"" [Heavy aircraft carrying cruiser "Kiev"]. Morskaya Kollektsiya ("Naval Collection").
