= List of cruiser classes in service =

The list of cruiser classes in service includes all those currently with navies or armed forces and auxiliaries in the world. Ships are grouped by type, and listed alphabetically within.

== Izumo-class aircraft-carrying multi-role cruiser ==
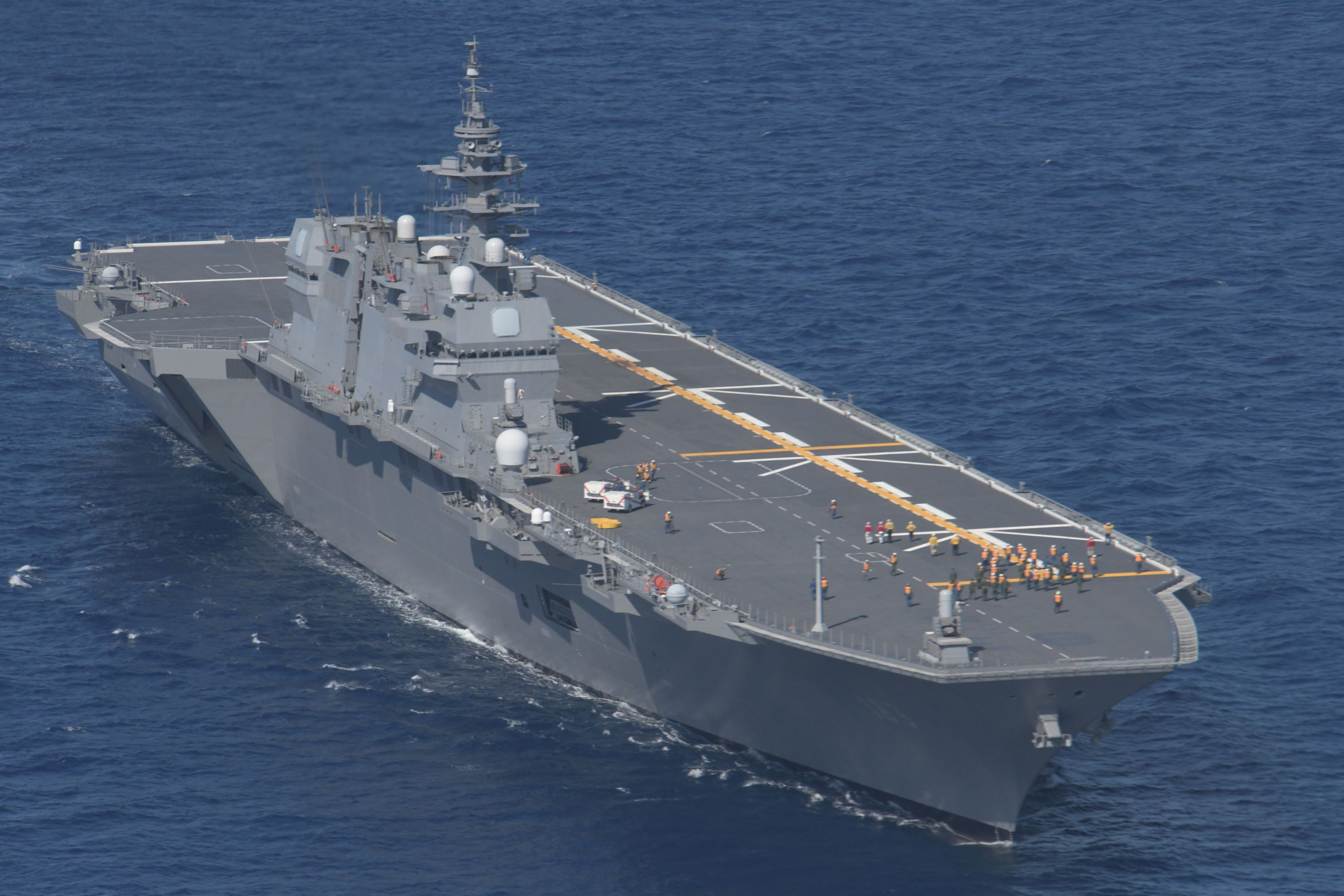
Izumo, pre-modification

- Builders: Japan (Japan Marine United)
- Displacement: 26,000 tons
- Aircraft:
  - Before conversion: 7 x Mitsubishi SH-60K Seahawk ASW helicopters; 2 x SAR helicopters; up to 14 or 28 aircraft total
  - After conversion: V/STOL fixed-wing aircraft (F-35B Lightning II)
- Armament: 2 x Phalanx CIWS; 2 x SeaRAM CIWS
- Powerplant: 4 x GE/IHI LM2500IEC COGAG gas turbines (112,100 hp)
- Speed: 30 knots
- Range:
- Ships in class: 2
- Operator: Japan Maritime Self-Defense Force
- Commissioned: 25 March 2015
- Status: 2 in service; modified and redesignated as aircraft-carrying multi-role cruisers (Note: CVM: "Cruiser Voler Multipurpose" (Japanese: 航空機搭載多機能護衛艦, romanized: kōkūki tōsai ta kinō goei-kan, lit. 'aircraft-carrying multi-role escort ship')) in October 2024

== Kirov-class (Project 1144 Orlan) heavy nuclear-powered missile cruiser ==
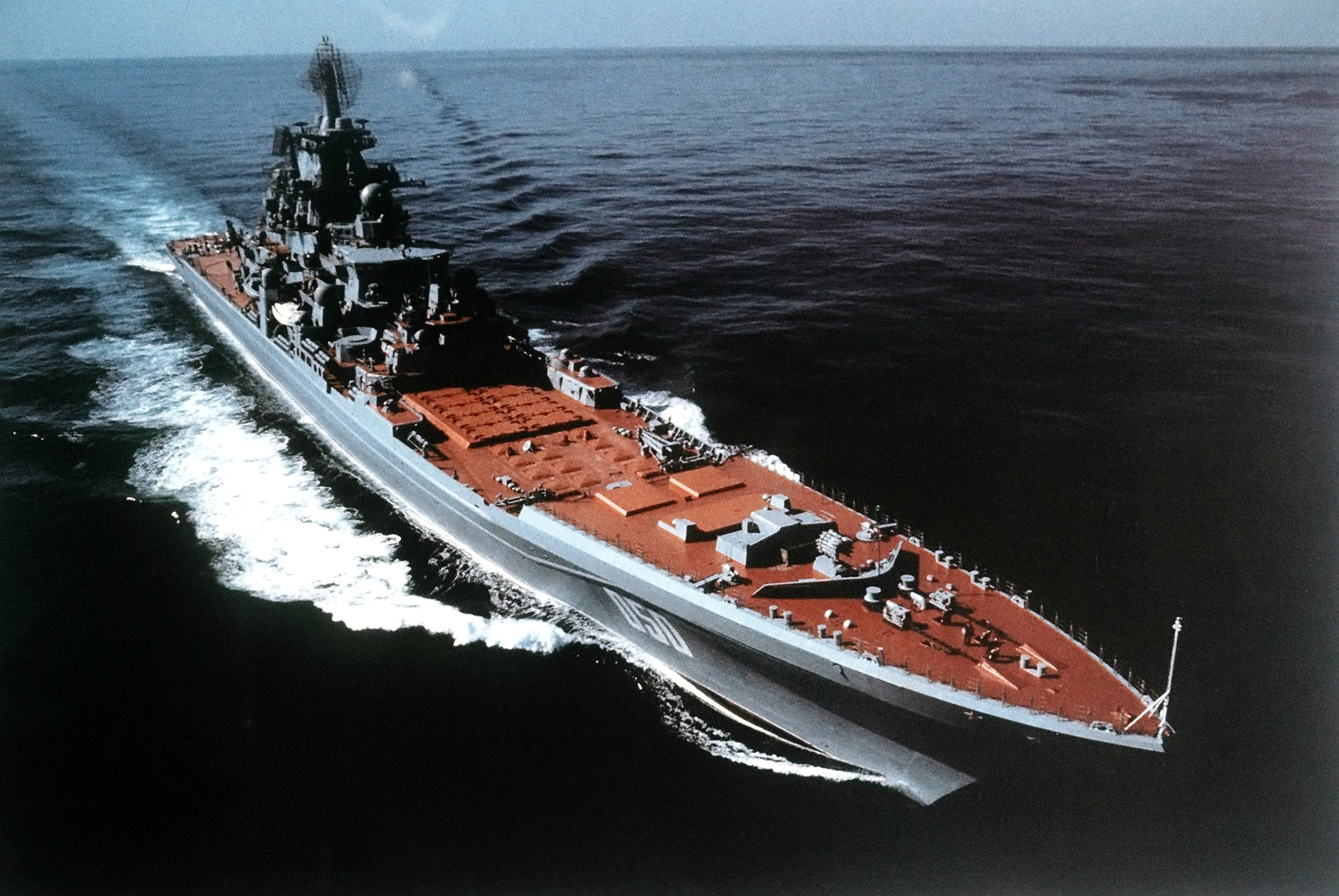
Frunze

- Builders: Soviet Union / Russia (Baltic Shipyard in Saint Petersburg)
- Displacement: 25,860 tons
- Aircraft: 3 × Kamov Ka-27 helicopters
- Armament:
  - Class leader: 20 × P-700 Granit SSM; 4 × 9K33 Osa SAM; 96 × SA-N-6 SAM; 2 × SS-N-14 ASWM; 10 × 533 mm torpedo tubes; 2 × 100 mm guns, AK-630 CIWS; RBU-6000 ASW rockets, 2 × RBU-1000 ASW rockets
  - Surviving units: 20 × P-700 Granit SSM; 4 × 9K33 Osa SAM; 96 × SA-N-6 SAM; 24 × octuple SA-N-9 Gauntlet SAM; 10x SS-N-15 ASWM; 10 × 533 mm torpedo tubes; 1 × 2 130 mm gun, 6 × CADS-N-1 Kashtan CIWS; 2 × RBU-12000 ASW rockets, 2 × RBU-1000 ASW rockets
- Powerplant: 2 × KN-3 reactors, 2 × oil fired boilers, 2 × steam turbines (140,000 shp)
- Speed: 32 knots
- Range: 1000 nmi at 32 knots, unlimited at 20 knots on nuclear power
- Ships in class: 4 (plus 3 cancelled)
- Operator: Russian Navy. (Former: Soviet Navy)
- Commissioned: December 1980
- Status: 1 in service, 1 under sea trials, 1 awaiting disposal, 1 scrapped, 3 cancelled

== Kuznetsov-class (Project 1143.5/1143.6 Krechyet) heavy aircraft-carrying cruiser ==
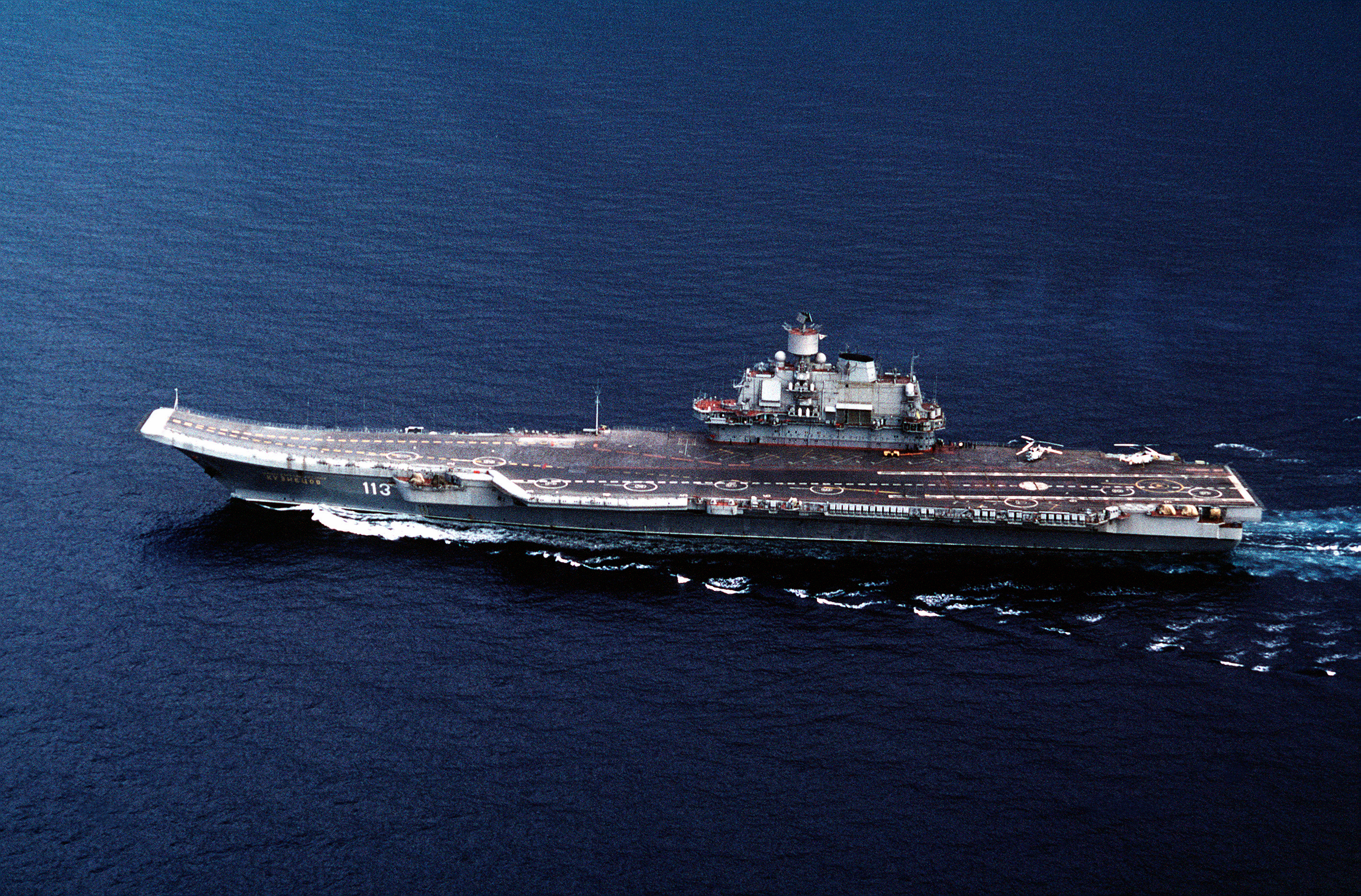
Admiral Flota Sovietskogo Soyuza N. G. Kuznetsov

- Builders: Soviet Union / Ukraine at Shipyard No. 444 (named for I. I. Nosenko) and China (Dalian Shipbuilding Industry Company in Liaoning)
- Displacement: 55,000 tons standard
- Aircraft: 30-50 total: 18-32 x fixed wing aircraft; 18-24 x helicopters
- Armament:
  - Class leader: 12 × P-700 Granit SSM; 192 × 3K95 Kinzhal SAM; 8 × Kashtan CIWS; 6 × AK-630 CIWS; 60 × UDAV-1 ASW rockets
  - Liaoning and Shandong: 3 × Type 1130 CIWS; 3 × HQ-10 SAMs
- Powerplant: Steam turbines (80,000 shp) (200,000 shp)
- Speed: 29 knots
- Range: 8,500 nmi at 18 knots, 3,800 at 29 knots
- Ships in class: 3
- Operator: People's Liberation Army Navy. (Note: Chinese ships have reduced armament and are classified as aircraft carriers proper) (Former: Ukraine(sold it to China), Russian Navy)
- Commissioned: 25 December 1990
- Status: 2 in service, 1 awaiting disposal

== Slava-class (Project 1164 Atlant) missile cruiser ==
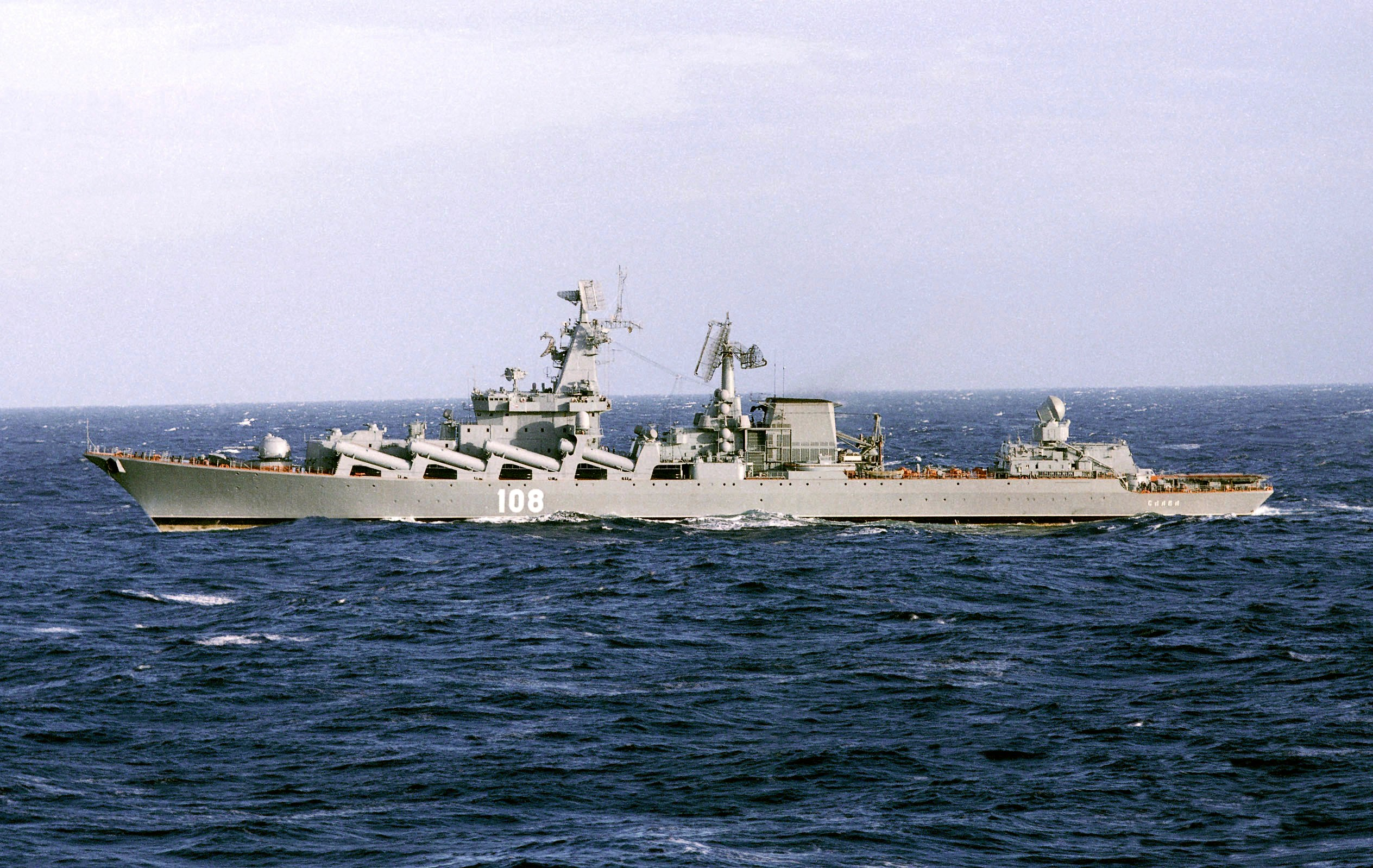
Moskva (former Slava)

- Builders: Soviet Union / Ukraine (61 Kommunar in Mykolaiv, Ukraine)
- Displacement: 11,490 tons
- Aircraft: 1 helicopter
- Armament: 16 × SS-N-12 SSM; 64 × SA-N-6 Grumble SAM; 2 × 130 mm guns; 6 × AK-630 cannon; 10 × 533 mm torpedo tubes
- Powerplant: COGOG gas turbines (125,000 hp)
- Speed: 34 knots
- Range: 9,000 nmi at 15 knots
- Ships in class: 4 (plus 2 cancelled)
- Operator: Russian Navy (2 ships), Ukrainian Navy (1 incomplete). (Former: Soviet Navy)
- Commissioned: 1982
- Status: 2 in service, 1 sunk, 1 incomplete, 2 cancelled

== Ticonderoga-class guided-missile cruiser ==
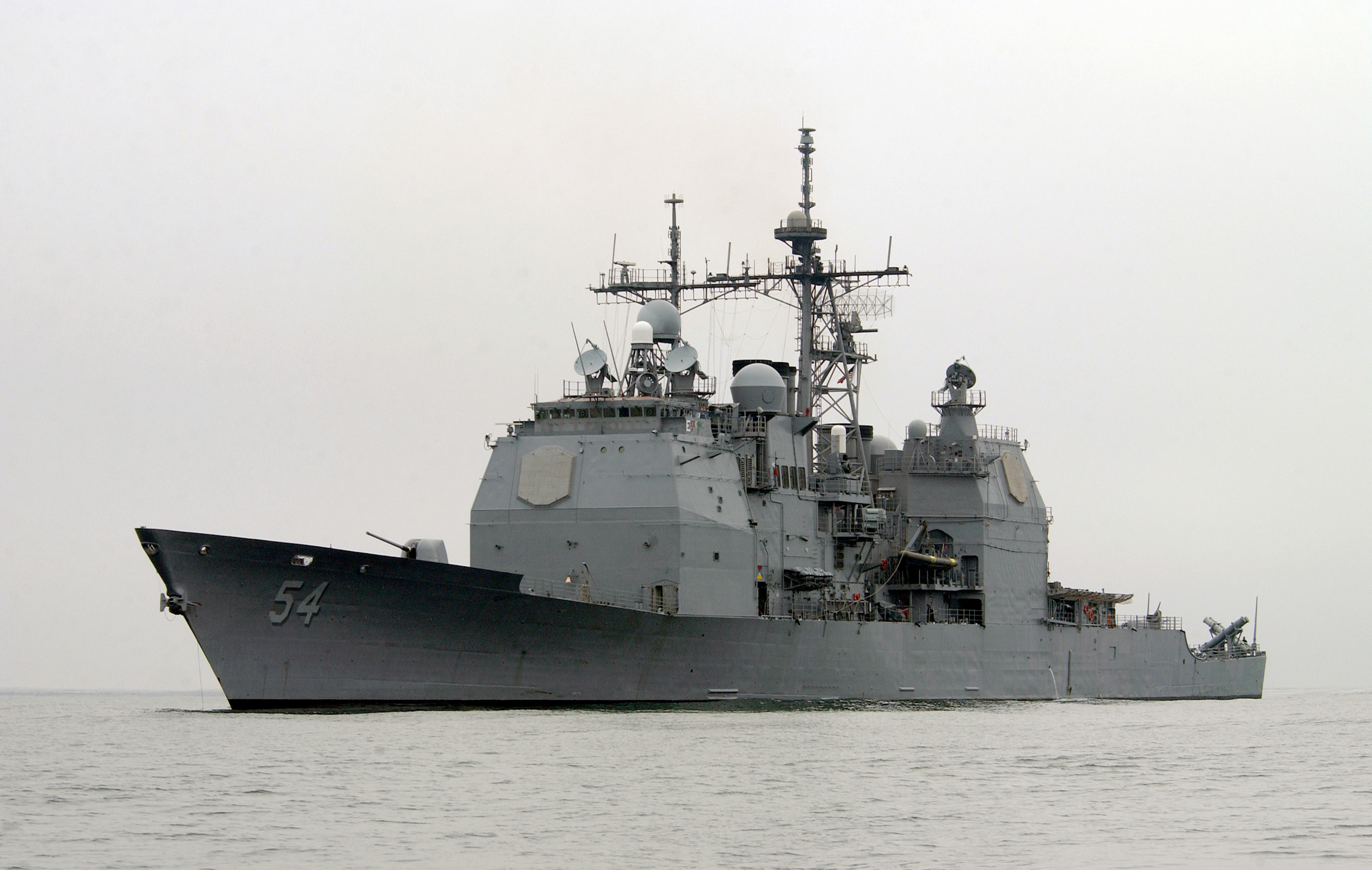
Antietam

- Builders: United States
- Displacement: 9,800 tons
- Aircraft: 2 × Sikorsky SH-60 Seahawk
- Armament: 2 × Mk 26 or Mk 41 launchers with up to 122 missiles (for Mk 41 VLS) or 88 (with Mk 26 twin-rail launchers) (ASROC, SM-2, Tomahawk); 2 × 127 mm DP guns; 2 × Phalanx CIWS, 8 Harpoon SSM
- Powerplant: 4 × gas turbines (80,000 shp)
- Speed: 32.5 knots
- Range: 6,000 nmi at 20 knots
- Ships in class: 27
- Operator: United States Navy
- Commissioned: 22 January 1983
- Status: 5 in service, 16 decommissioned, 4 scrapped, 2 sunk

== See also ==
- List of naval ship classes in service

== Notes ==
=== Bibliography ===
- Kaijin-sha, ed. (February 2019), "Technical Characterististics of Izumo-class DDH", Ships of the World (in Japanese) (894), Kaijin-sha: 107–123, NAID 40021782332
