= AK-130 =

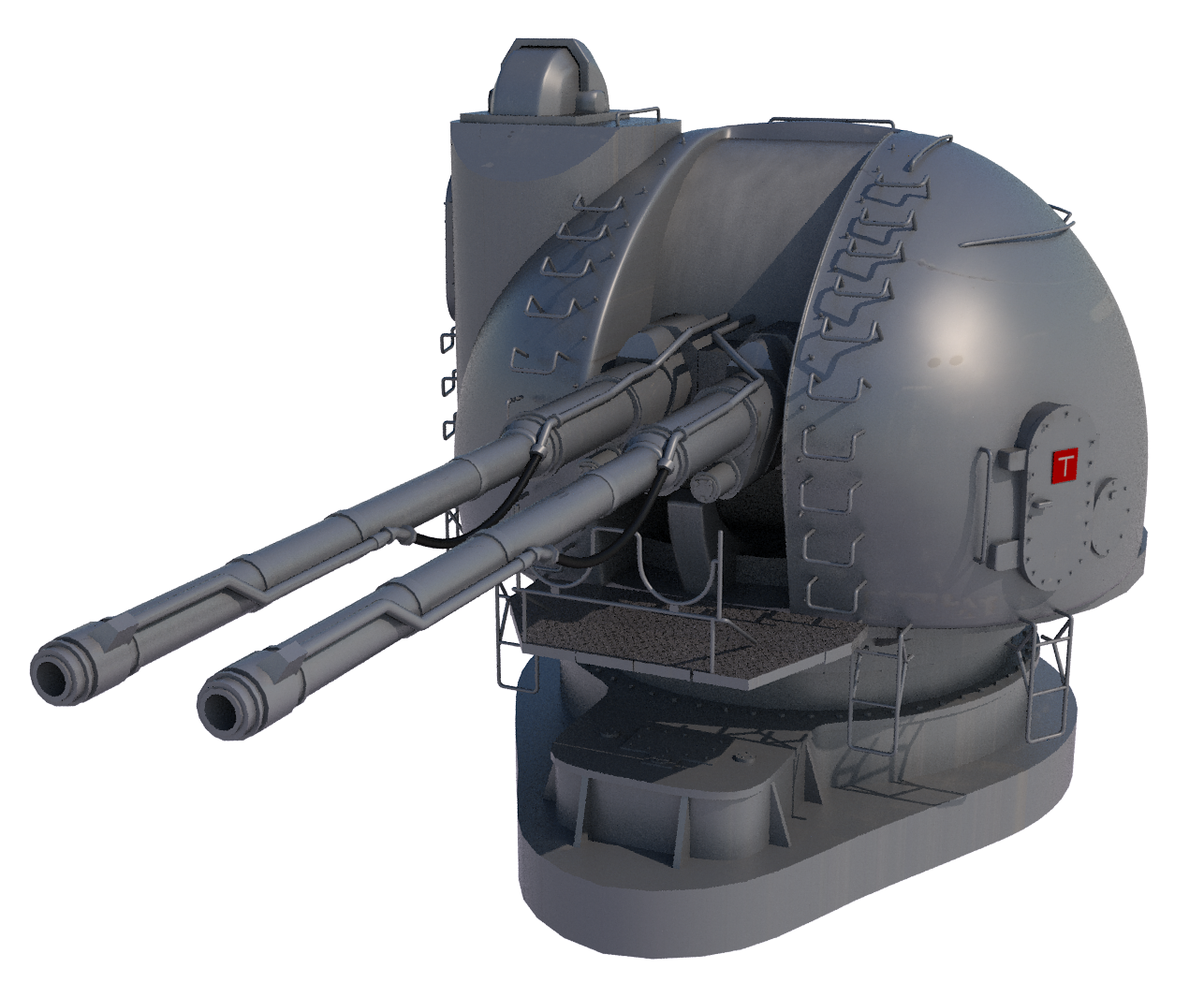
- AK-130 3D model render
- Type: Naval cannon
- Place of origin: USSR

Service history
- Used by: USSR and Russia

Specifications
- Length: 9100 mm (70 calibers)
- Caliber: 130 mm
- Elevation: 85 degrees
- Rate of fire: 10 - 40 rounds per minute (per gun barrel)
- Maximum firing range: 23,000 m (surface targets); 15,000 m (aircraft); 8,000 m (missiles)

The AK-130 is a Russian designed automatic dual barrel naval cannon with a caliber of 130 millimetres (5.1 in), capable of firing 10-40 rounds per minute (per gun barrel).

== History ==
The design of the cannon began in June 1976 in KB Arsenal. A first single-barrel cannon designated A-217 was made, followed by the twin-barrel A-218, which was chosen due to its higher rate of fire and appeal to the admiral of the Union of Soviet Socialist Republic's navy S. G. Gorshkov.

The Barricades factory produced the first samples. The cannon went on trial operation on the Project 956 destroyer for five years, and was adopted into service in the USSR on November 1, 1985.

== Description ==
Innovations include the unitary cannon cartridge and the automatic loading system.

It has a high rate of fire (up to 90 RPM), at the cost of greater weight. The autoloader removed the need of a loader and allows for continuous firing until the ammunition storage is emptied.

The fire control system has sight correction devices for bursts of falling shells and a target post for firing at coastal targets. Its high rate of fire, when provided with adequate types of shells, allows the cannon to serve as anti-aircraft artillery. The cartridges include charges with remote and radar detonators.

It uses the MR-184 radar, a dual-band radar. It can simultaneously track two targets. Its range is 75 km with a tracking range of 40 km. System weight is 8 tons.

== Guidance ==
The Lev-218 (MR-184) guidance system was developed by KB Ametist on the basis of Lev-114: (MR-114 from the AK-100). According to some reports, Lev-214 (MR-104) was used instead on Project 956 destroyers. The system includes a target tracking radar, a TV-sight, the DVU-2 laser rangefinder, a ballistic computer, equipment selection system and counter-jamming. The system is able to receive target designation from detection equipment on the ship, movement parameters, elevate the cannons and can adjust shooting bursts as well as track projectiles automatically. The DVU-2, along with the software, was developed by TsNIIAG and PO LOMO, using an autonomous indirectly stabilized laser beam in 1977.

== Users ==
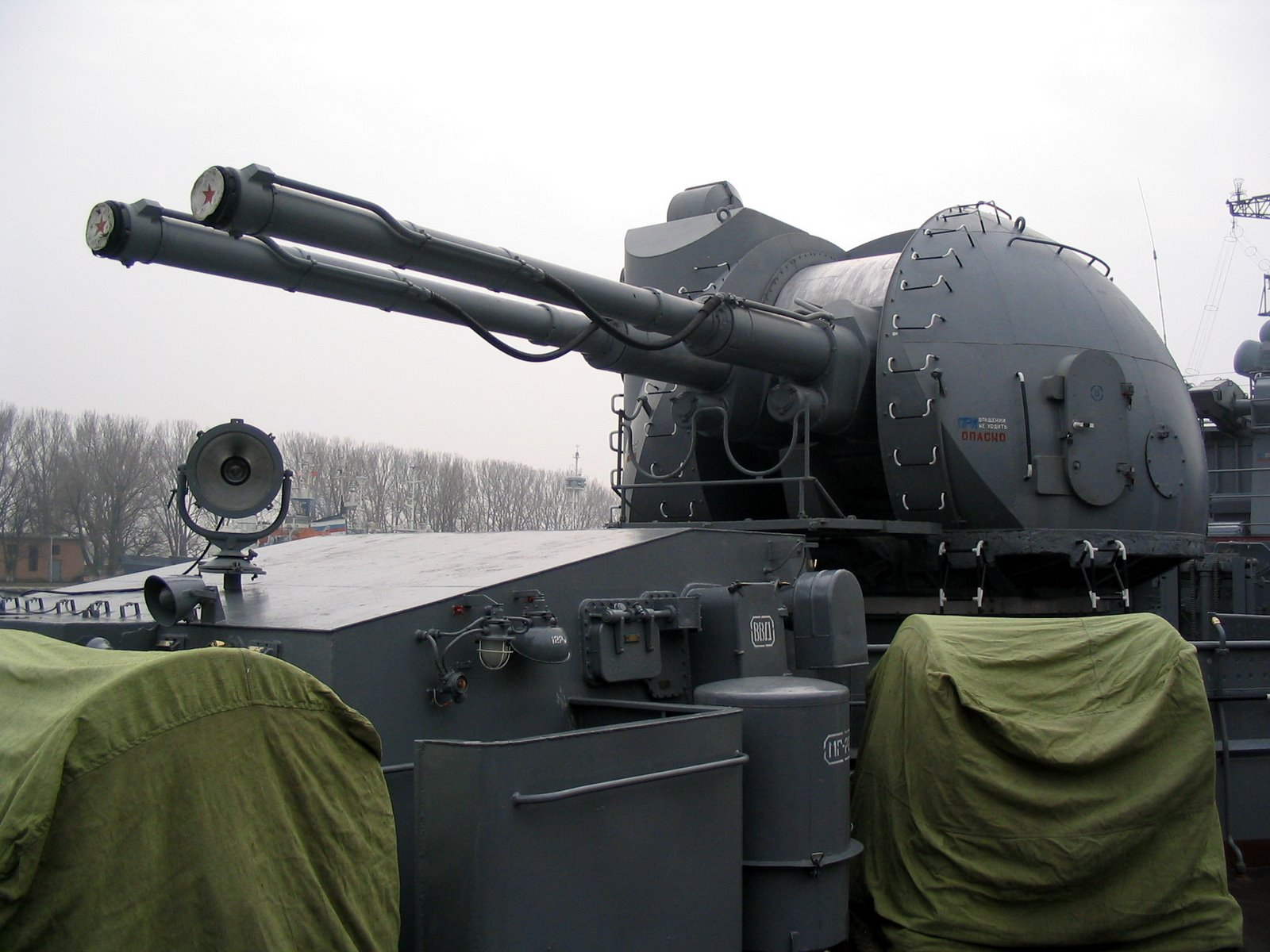
AK-130 Naval guns mounted on the destroyer Nastoychiviy.

The Russian Navy uses the cannon on Projects 956, 1144, 1164 and others.

Two A-218 turrets are placed on every Project 956 destroyer, one each on the bow and the stern side before a tank and helicopter hangar was added. The traverse is limited to 100 degrees from either side, with 320 rounds stored in every turret. Project 956 and 956E destroyers, as well as their variants are equipped with this configuration.

On Slava-class cruisers, a single A-218 is installed at the front of the ship. A horizontal sector of 210 degrees is provided and 340 rounds are stored in the turret. Slava-class cruisers are equipped with the Puma modernization device for artillery guidance systems (essentially the analogue of the Podacha terrestrial complex) for centralized "aimless" aiming at targets.

Kirov-class heavy nuclear cruisers carry a turret mounted at the rear, except for the lead ship which has 2 AK-100s. The turret has a 180-degree sector. 440 rounds are stored, and a Rus-A centralized guidance system for naval artillery is installed. As part of its refits in the 2020s Admiral Nakhimov was upgraded to a A-192M gun.

== Cartridge ==
Cartridges used on A-217, A-218, A-222 and A-192M systems are:

- F-44 - Explosive round, projectile weight 33.4 kg, explosive weight 3.56 kg, with 4MRM fuze.
- ZS-44 - Anti-aircraft round, projectile weight 33.4 kg, explosive weight 3.56 kg, with DVM-60M1 fuze.
- ZS-44R - Anti-aircraft round, projectile weight 33.4 kg, explosive weight 3.56 kg, with AR-32 fuze.

Maximum allowed miss distance for ZS-series rounds:

- 8 m (radio proximity fuze, anti-ship missiles)
- 15 m (radio proximity fuze, aircraft)

Cartridge weight: 52.8 kg. Length: 1364–1369 mm, unitary loading.

== Ships with AK-130 ==
- Slava-class cruiser (Project 1164)
- Kirov-class battlecruiser (Project 1144)
- Sovremenny-class destroyer (Project 956)
- Udaloy II-class destroyer (Project 1155.1)

== See also ==
- 4.5 inch Mark 8 naval gun
- 5"/54 caliber Mark 45 gun
- H/PJ-38 130mm naval gun
- French 100 mm naval gun
- Otobreda 127/54 Compact
- Otobreda 127/64
