= P-500 Bazalt =

Late-Soviet supersonic anti-ship missile

P-500 Bazalt / P-1000 Vulkan (NATO reporting name: SS-N-12 'Sandbox')
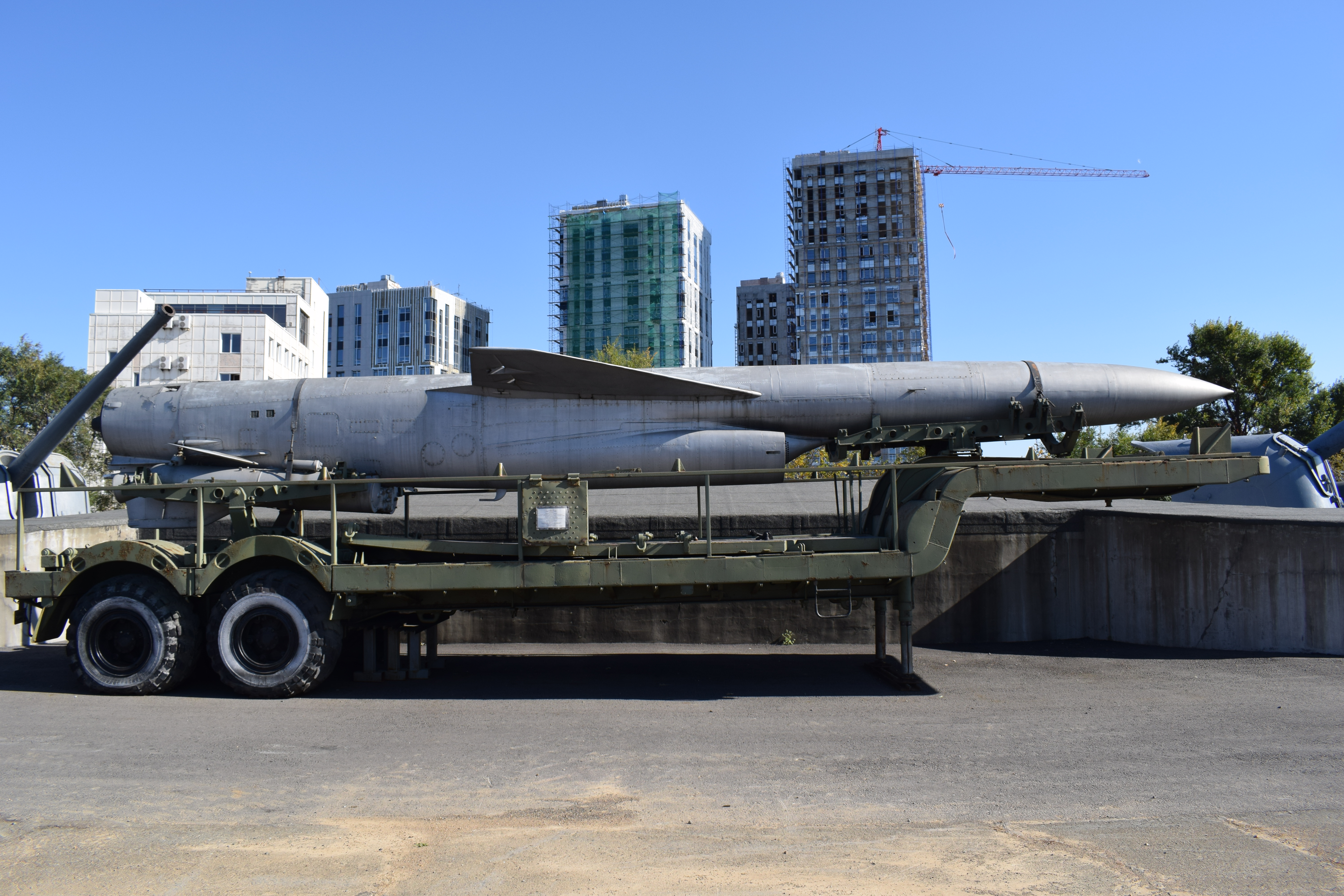
- P-500 Bazalt
- Type: Cruise missile Surface-to-surface missile Submarine-launched cruise missile
- Place of origin: Soviet Union

Service history
- In service: Since 1975
- Used by: Soviet Union, Russia

Production history
- Designer: OKB-52/NPO Mashinostroyeniya Chelomey
- Designed: 1963-1974
- Manufacturer: P.A. Strela
- Produced: 1970–1987 (P-500) 1985–1992 (P-1000)

Specifications
- Mass: 4,800 kg (10,600 lb)
- Length: 11.7 meters
- Diameter: 0.88 meters
- Wingspan: 2.6 meters
- Warhead: High explosive or nuclear
- Warhead weight: 1,000 kg (2,205 lb) (P-500)
- Blast yield: 350 kt
- Engine: turbojet
- Operational range: 550 km (300 nmi) (P-500)
- Flight altitude: 50–5,000 meters
- Maximum speed: Mach 3+ (P-1000 Vulkan)
- Guidance system: Semi-active radar homing, terminal active radar homing
- Launch platform: Echo II & Juliett-class submarines Kiev-class aircraft carrier & Slava-class cruiser

The P-500 Bazalt (Russian: П-500 «Базальт»; English: basalt) is a turbojet-powered, supersonic cruise missile used by the Soviet and Russian navies. Its GRAU designation is 4K80 and its NATO reporting name is SS-N-12 Sandbox, its upgraded version being the P-1000 Vulkan AShM SLCM.

== History ==
Developed by OKB-52 MAP (later NPO Mashinostroyeniya), it entered service to replace the SS-N-3 Shaddock (Russian designation: P-5 Pyatyorka). The P-500 Bazalt was first deployed in 1975 on the Soviet aircraft carrier Kiev, and was later added to both the Echo II and the Juliett-class submarines, replacing their Pyatyorka/Shaddock missiles. A version of the P-500 Bazalt with improved guidance and engines is used on the Slava-class cruisers. The sixteen launch tubes flanking the superstructure are an unmistakable characteristic of this cruiser class.

== Description ==
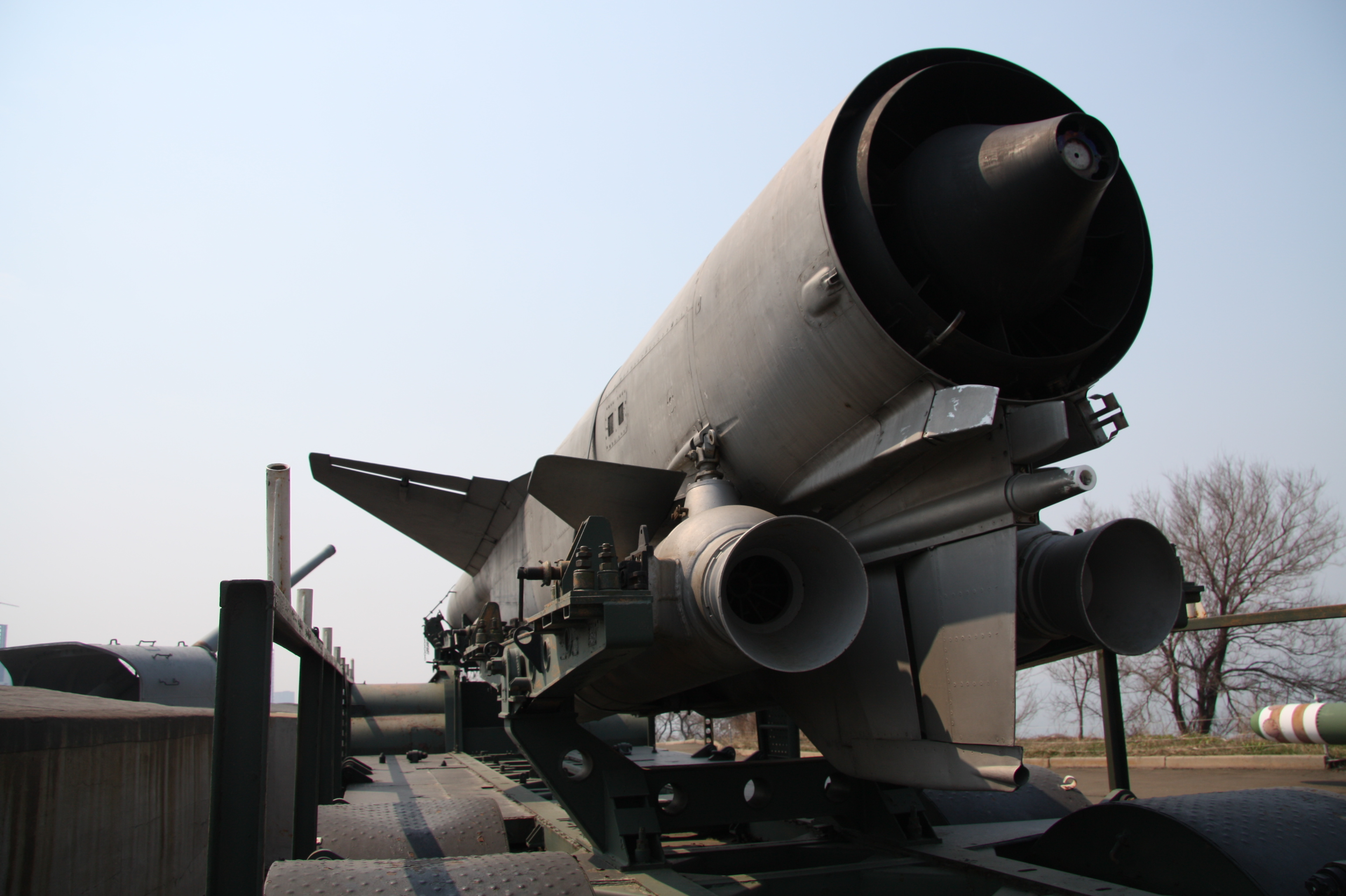
Rear view

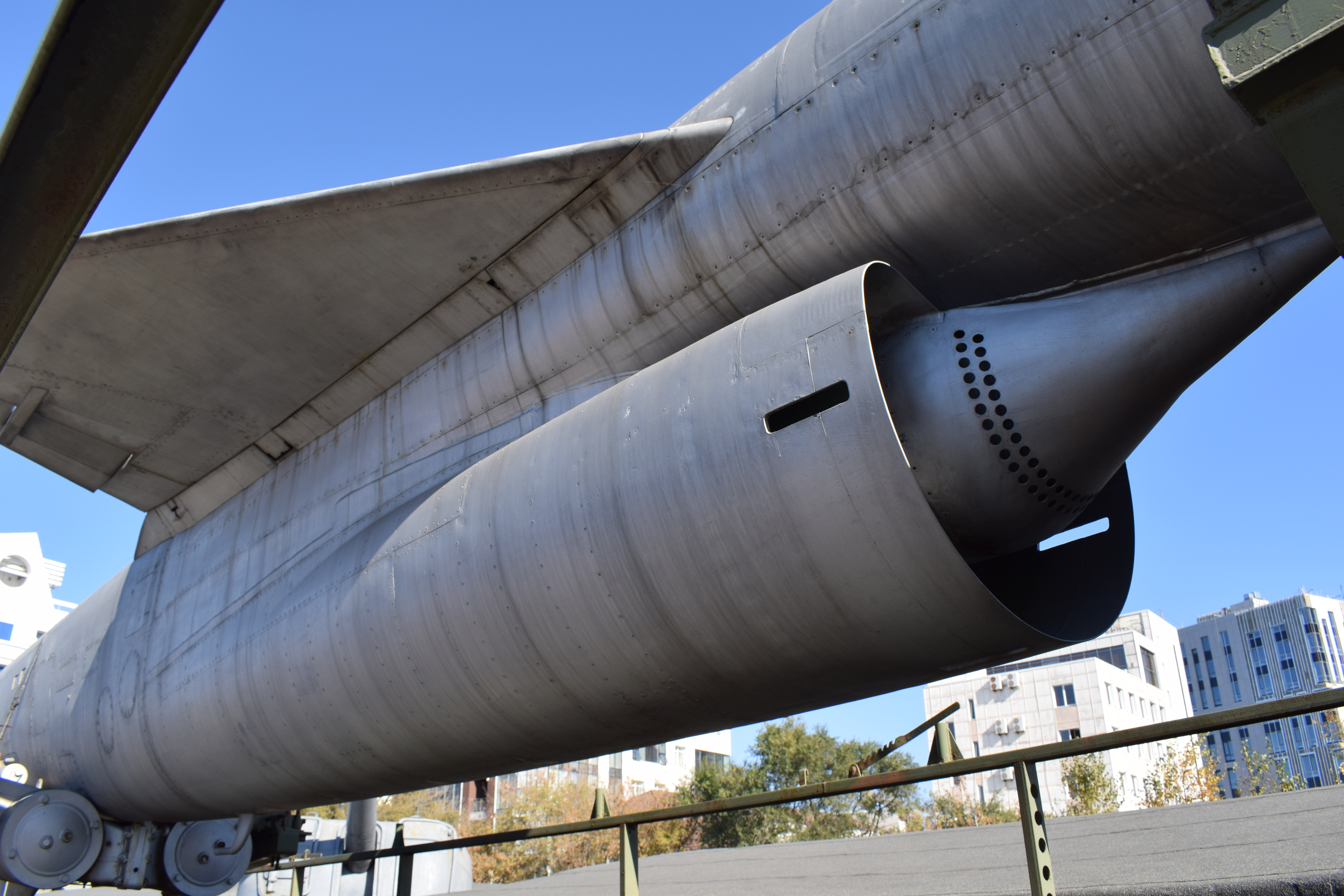
Jet engine air inlet cone

The P-500 Bazalt has a 550 km range and a payload of 1,000 kg, which allows it to carry a 350 kt nuclear or a 950 kg semi-armor-piercing high-explosive warhead. The P-500 Bazalt uses active radar homing for terminal guidance, and can receive mid-course correction from the Tupolev Tu-95RTs Bear D, the Kamov Ka-25K Hormone B and the Kamov Ka-31.

The missiles were intended to be used in salvos – a submarine could launch eight in rapid succession, maintaining control of each through a separate datalink. In flight the group could co-ordinate their actions. One would fly to a higher altitude and use its active radar to search for targets, forwarding this data to the other missiles which remained at low altitude.

The missiles were programmed so that half of a salvo would head for a carrier target, with the rest dividing between other ships. If the high-flying missile was shot down, another from the salvo would automatically pop up to take its place. All of the missiles would switch to active radar for the terminal phase of the attack.

== P-1000 Vulkan ==
The P-1000 Vulkan

An improved version of the P-500 was installed on three Echo II submarines towards the end of the Cold War. The P-1000 Vulkan (GRAU 3M70) presumably has the same firing range and maximum speed with the P-500 Bazalt (range 800 km). The missile weight was increased by 1–2 tons. The missile has a turbojet engine and a starting powder accelerator. High-altitude flight regimes are presumably the same as that of the P-500.

The P-1000 was ordered on 15 May 1979 from NPO Mashinostroyeniya Chelomey. It first flew in July 1982 and was accepted for service on 18 December 1987. It was installed on three Echo II submarines of the Northern Fleet between 1987 and 1993. The conversion of two units of the Pacific Fleet, the K-10 and K-34, was abandoned due to lack of funds.

Of the submarines that did receive the P-1000, the K-1 was decommissioned after a reactor accident in 1989, the K-35 was stricken in 1993 and the K-22 in 1995. The P-1000 has been installed on the Slava-class cruiser Varyag, and some sources reported P-1000 missiles on her sister ship Moskva.

Ships armed with the P-500 missile

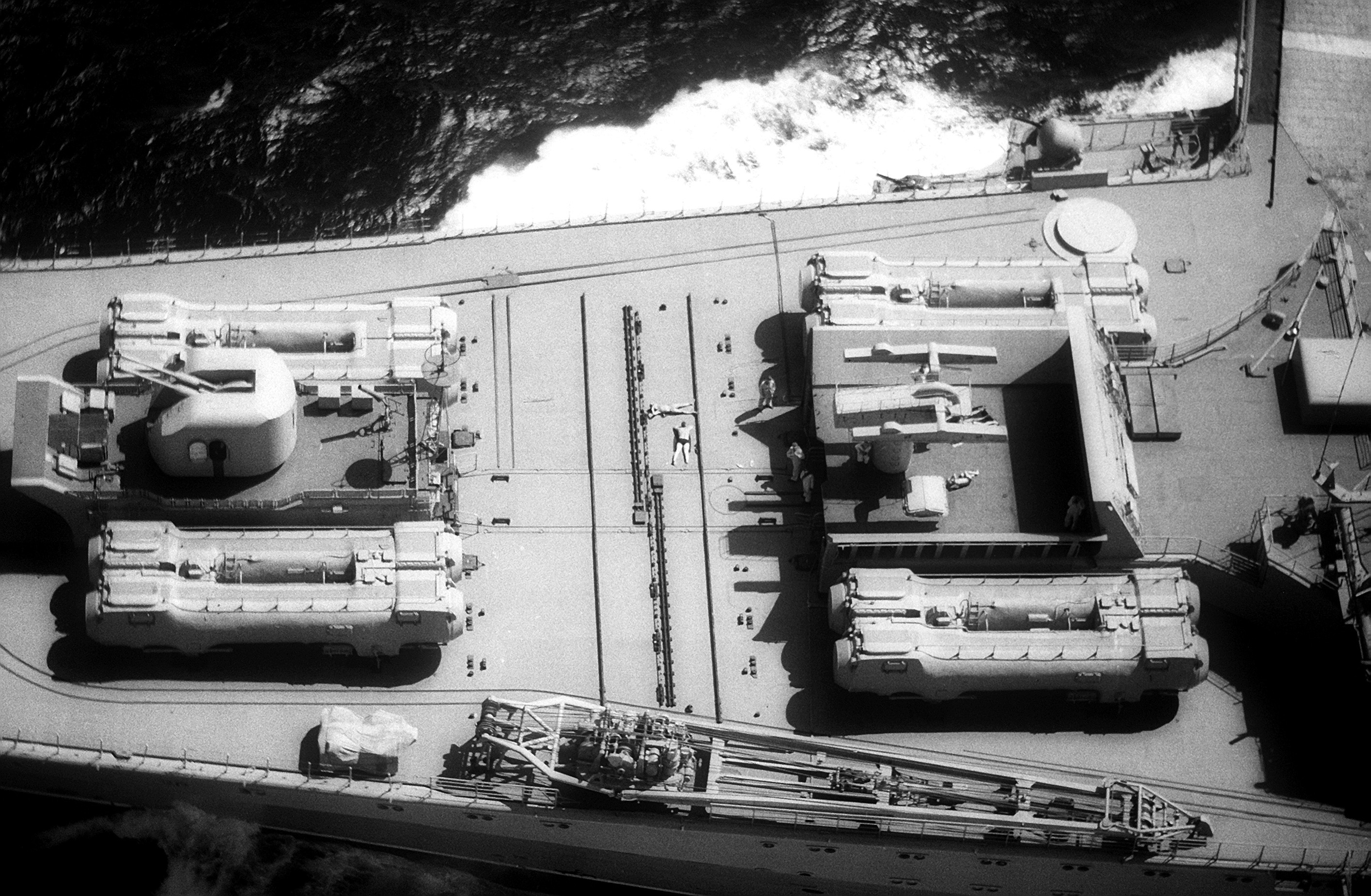
Eight SS-N-12 launchers on the bow of the aircraft carrying cruiser Kiev

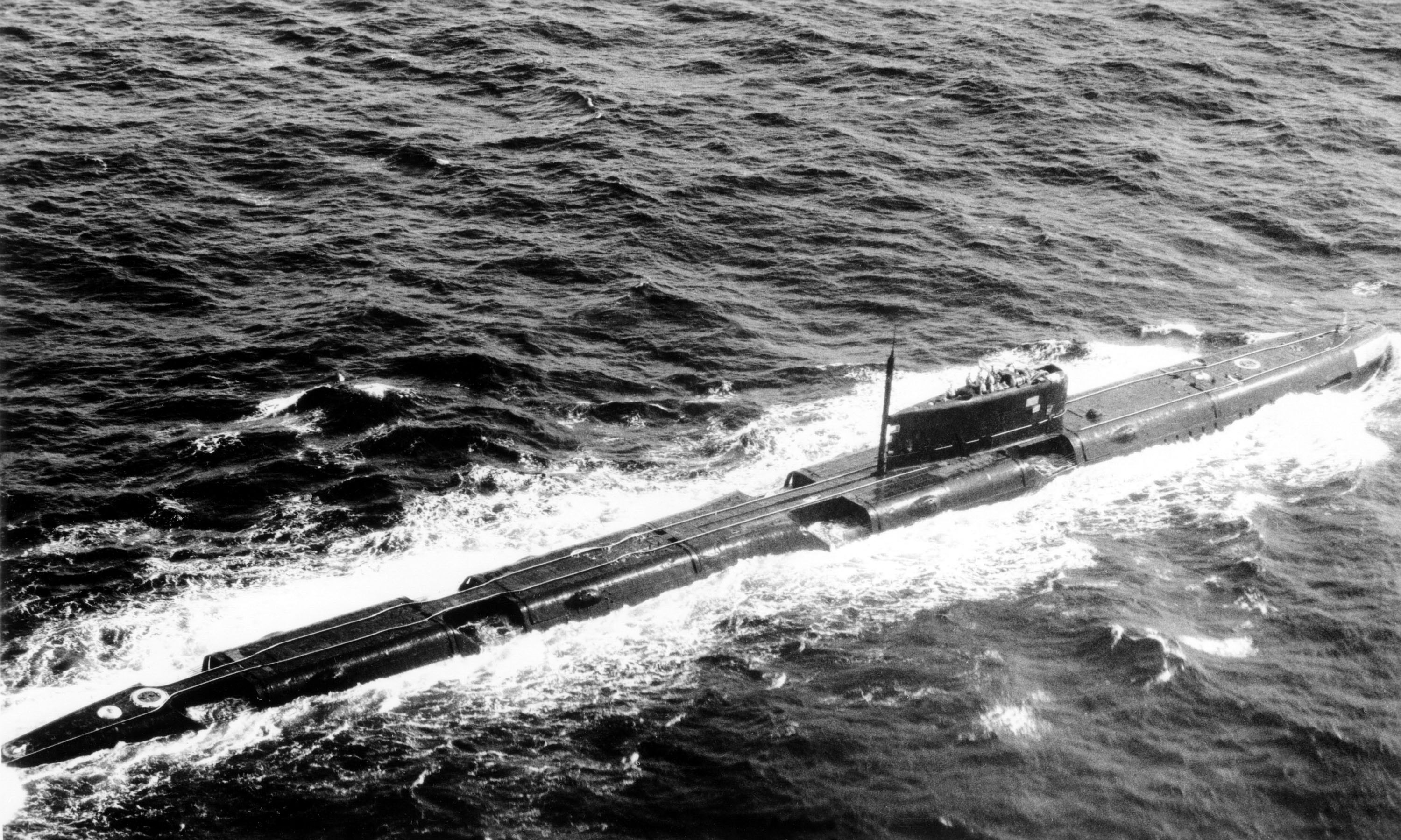
Fourteen Echo II-class submarines were upgraded to carry the P-500, and three of those went on to receive the P-1000 Vulkan. The distinctive notches on the Echo's hulls redirect the exhaust of the P-500 during launch.

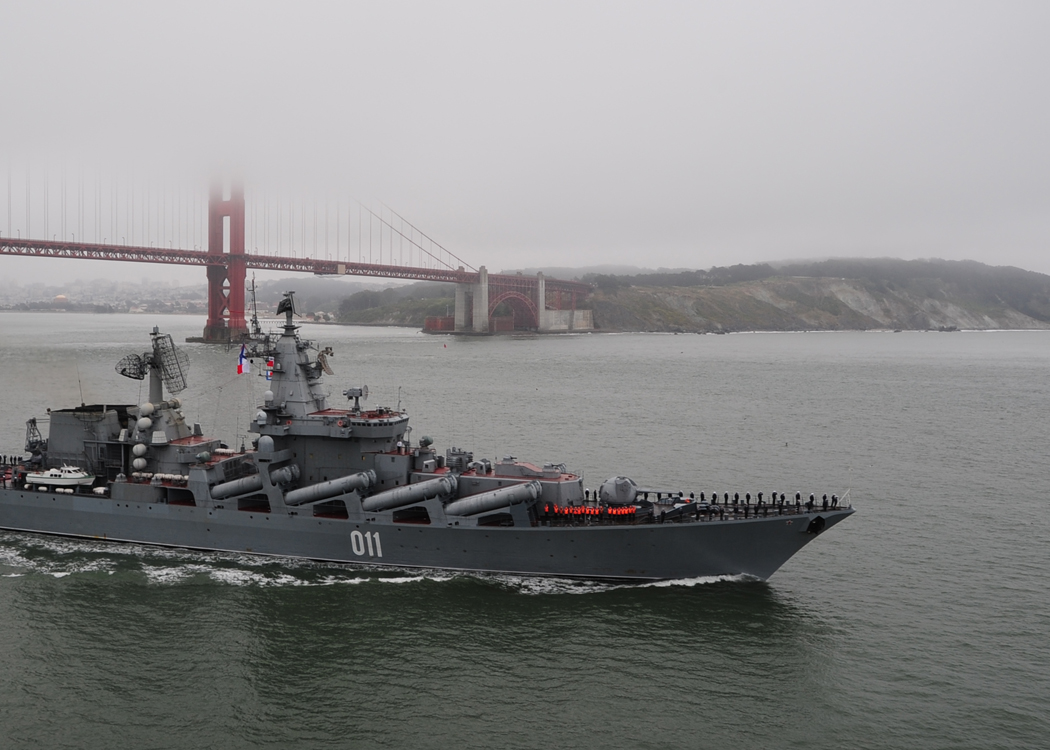
Eight pairs of P-500 canisters are a distinctive feature of Slava class cruisers; those on the Varyag (pictured) have been upgraded to the P-1000 Vulkan.

== Operators ==
Current

Russia

- Russian Navy

Former

Soviet Union

- Soviet Navy

== See also ==
- P-700 Granit
- P-5/P-35
- Operation Ivy Bells
