= KRI Ratulangi =

Don-class submarine tender

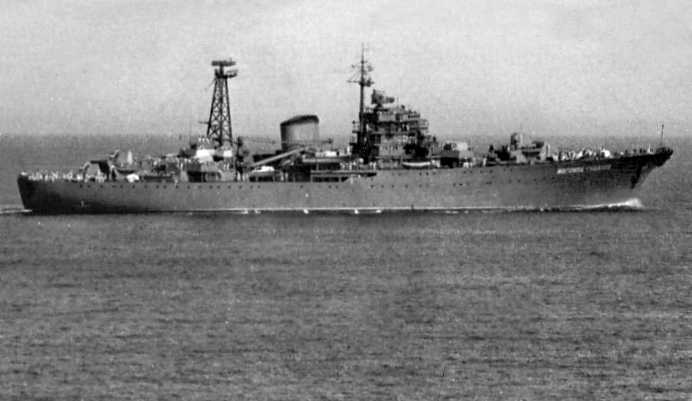
- A Don-class submarine tender of Soviet Navy in 1967

History

Soviet Union
- Name: Nikolay Kartashov; (Николай Карташов)
- Namesake: Карташов, Николай Иванович
- Builder: Black Sea Shipyard
- Yard number: 619
- Laid down: 18 December 1959
- Launched: 20 December 1960
- Commissioned: 31 March 1962
- Decommissioned: 1962
- Identification: Pennant number: 441
- Fate: Transferred to Indonesian Navy, 1962

Indonesia
- Name: Ratulangi
- Namesake: Sam Ratulangi
- Acquired: 1962
- Commissioned: 1962
- Identification: Pennant number: 4101, 301, 400
- Fate: Unknown

General characteristics
- Class & type: Don-class submarine tender
- Displacement: 2,316 tonnes (2,279 long tons) standard; 3,066 tonnes (3,018 long tons) full load
- Length: 140 m (460 ft)
- Beam: 17.7 m (58 ft)
- Draught: 6.4 m (21 ft)
- Propulsion: 4 diesel engines, 8,000 hp (6,000 kW)
- Speed: 17 knots (31 km/h; 20 mph)
- Range: 21,000 km (11,000 nmi; 13,000 mi) at 10 knots (19 km/h; 12 mph)
- Complement: 300-450
- Sensors & processing systems: Radar: Hawk Screech; Slim Net; Rys-1
- Electronic warfare & decoys: 2 Watch dog ECM systems, Vee cone communication system
- Armament: 4 × single 100 mm (4 in) guns; 4 × dual 57 mm (2.2 in) guns, 4 × dual 25 mm guns (in late 1970s)

Nikolay Kartashov was a Don-class submarine tender of the Soviet Navy which later was transferred to the Indonesian Navy and renamed KRI Ratulangi.

== Development and design ==
The project of the submarine tenders was developed in the central design bureau "Baltsudoproekt" under the leadership of the chief designer V. I. Mogilevich. The main observer from the Navy was Captain 1st Rank G.V. Zemlyanichenko. The construction of the lead ship was completed in Nikolaev at the Black Sea shipyard in 1958. In total, seven sub tenders of Project 310 were built for the Soviet Navy in 1958-1963.

Don-class submarine tenders had a total displacement of 7150 tons and 5030 tons while they're empty. Main dimensions: maximum length - 140 m, width - 17.67 m, draft - 5.6 m. Two-shaft diesel-electric main power plant with a capacity of 4000 hp. with. provided the ship with a full speed of 16 knots. The cruising range reached 3000 nautical miles (at a speed of 12.5 knots), autonomy - 40 days. The crew consisted of 350 people, including 28 officers.

They could serve four submarines of Project 611 or Project 613. The equipment of the floating base was capable of providing navigational and emergency repair of the hull, mechanisms and weapons and storage of 42 533-mm torpedoes in a special room. A 100-ton crane was housed at the bow of the ship.

The defensive armaments of the ships consisted of four single-barreled 100-mm artillery mounts B-34USMA and four 57-mm twin installations ZIF-31 with the Ryf control radar, the sonar station was not provided. After modernization, on two ships, instead of two aft 100-mm installations, a take-off and landing pad was equipped for basing one Ka-25 helicopter. On the last floating base of the series, the Osa-M air defense missile system was installed.

== Construction and career ==
Nikolay Kartashov was built at Black Sea Shipyard in Mykolaiv and was launched on 25 June 1957 and commissioned on 1 July 1960.

She was decommissioned in 1962 and transferred to the Indonesian Navy as RI Ratulangi (4101). She was acquired along with 12 Whiskey-class submarine as part of the First Nasution Mission, which aims to improve Indonesian Armed Forces capabilities as preparation for Operation Trikora. Alongside Ratulangi, the Navy also received RI Thamrin of Atrek-class submarine tender. Ratulangi didn't partake in the operation, as she arrived in Indonesia in July 1962, shortly before the West Irian dispute was concluded in New York Agreement which was signed on 15 August 1962.

Her first combat assignment was during the Indonesia–Malaysia confrontation from 1963 to 1966, of which the ship play her role.

The ship participated in Operation Seroja, the invasion of East Timor in late 1975. KRI Ratulangi was involved in Battle of Dili as the command ship of Operation Seroja Amphibious Task Force, along with KRI Martadinata as naval gunfire support, KRI Barakuda as sub-chaser, KRI Jayawijaya as repair ship, KRI Sorong as oiler, and KRI Teluk Bone which carried landing forces from 5th Landing Team Battalion of Marine Infantry. On 7 December at 04:30 UTC+8, the landing forces disembarked from Teluk Bone, covered with naval gunfire from Martadinata. At 05:00, the landing at Kampung Alor went smoothly.

During the landing process, the task force were shadowed by two Portuguese Navy frigates, consisted of NRP Afonso de Albuquerque and a João Belo-class frigate. Both Portuguese frigates were already present in Timorese waters since October 1975. Ratulangi, which has four 100 mm guns, keep track of the two frigates, while Martadinata continues to carry on her assignment. The Portuguese frigates were observing the landing process 7 km (3.8 nmi) from the Indonesian ships.

In early 1980s her pennant number was changed to 301, and in mid 1980s it was again changed to 400.

From the mid until late 1980s, Ratulangi was used as patrol ship, until she was decommissioned sometime that decade. Her final fate is unknown.

== See also ==
- List of ships of the Soviet Navy
- List of ships of Russia by project number
- List of former ships of the Indonesian Navy
