= USS Charles Berry =

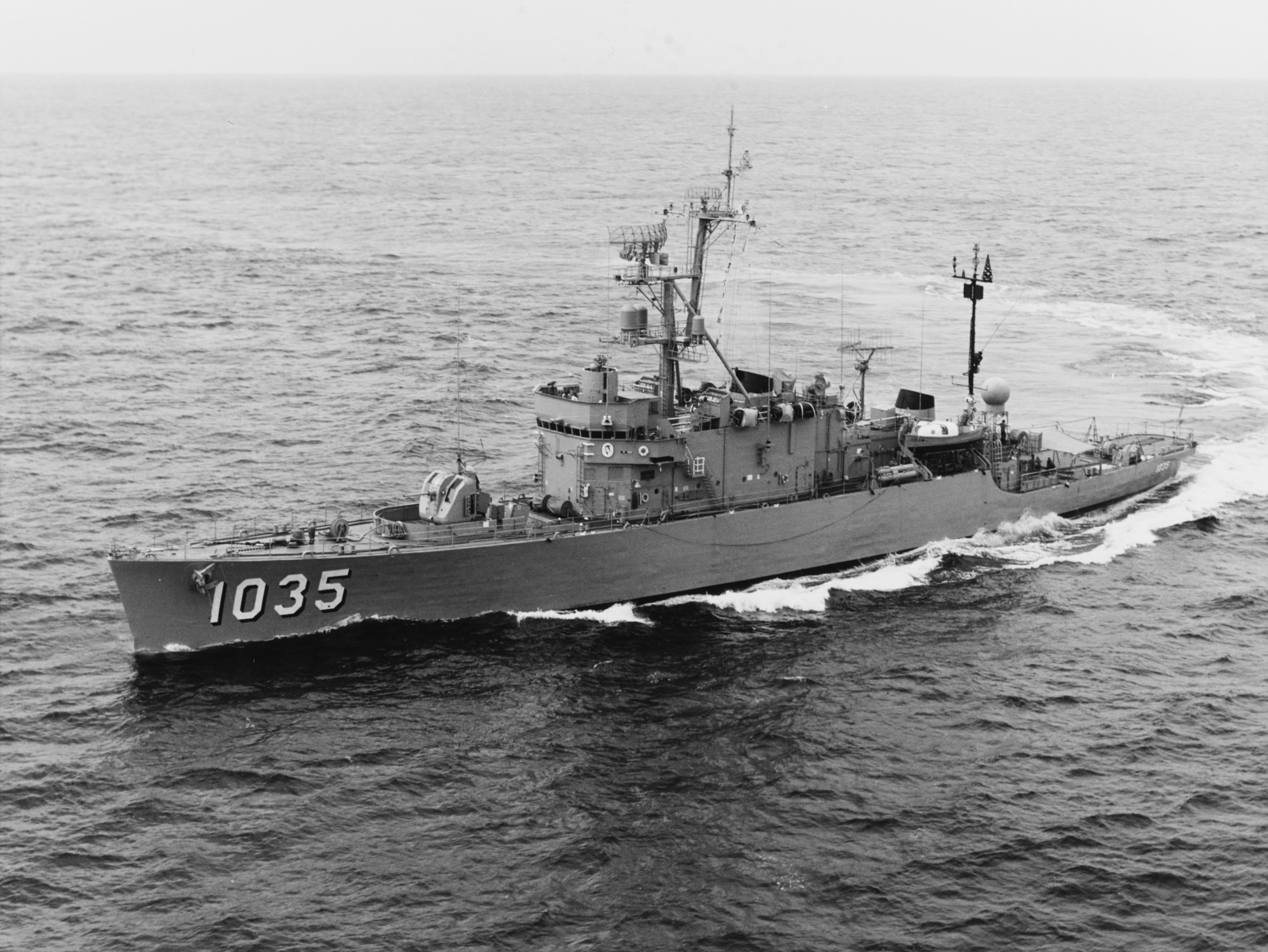
- USS Charles Berry off the coast of Hawaii in 1971

History

United States
- Name: Charles Berry
- Namesake: Charles J. Berry
- Builder: Avondale Marine Ways, Avondale
- Laid down: 29 October 1958
- Launched: 17 March 1959
- Sponsored by: Mrs. C. Berry
- Commissioned: 25 November 1959
- Decommissioned: 31 January 1974
- Stricken: 31 January 1974
- Home port: San Diego (1959–1964); Pearl Harbor (1964–1974)
- Identification: Code letters: NGQO; Pennant number: DE-1035
- Motto: Courage - Tenacity
- Fate: Transferred to Indonesia, 1974

Indonesia
- Name: Martadinata
- Namesake: Eddy Martadinata
- Acquired: 31 January 1974
- Decommissioned: 8 September 2005
- Identification: Pennant number: 342
- Status: Decommissioned; awaiting disposal

General characteristics
- Class & type: Claud Jones-class destroyer escort
- Displacement: 1,314 long tons (1,335 t) standard; 1,970 long tons (2,000 t) full load
- Length: 312 ft (95 m)
- Beam: 38 ft 10 in (11.84 m)
- Draft: 12 ft 1 in (3.68 m)
- Propulsion: 4 × Fairbanks-Morse 38ND8 Diesels; 9,240 shp; 7,000 bhp; 1 shaft
- Speed: 20–22 knots (37–41 km/h)
- Range: 7,000 nmi (13,000 km) at 12 kn (22 km/h)
- Complement: 171 total: 12 Officers; 159 enlisted men
- Electronic warfare & decoys: AN/SPS-6E-2D air search radar
- Armament: 2 × 3"/50 caliber guns (2 × 1); 6 × 12.75 in (324 mm) Mk.32 torpedo tubes (2 × 3); 2 × Hedgehog anti-submarine mortar; As KRI Martadinata; 1 × 3"/50 caliber gun; 6 × 12.75 in (324 mm) Mk.32 torpedo tubes (2 × 3); 2 × Hedgehog anti-submarine mortar; 1 x 37 mm V-11 twin-barrel AA gun; 1 x 25 mm 2M-3 twin-barrel AA gun

USS Charles Berry (DE-1035) was a Claud Jones-class destroyer escort named for Medal of Honor recipient Charles J. Berry. She was commissioned in 1959. The ship was sold to Indonesia in 1974 and renamed KRI Martadinata in honor of Vice Admiral Raden Eddy Martadinata, a former Indonesian naval commander.

== Description ==
The class was designed under project SCB 131 as a cost-effective version of an anti-submarine warfare (ASW) ship that could be built quickly in case of rapid mobilization. The Claud Jones class had a standard displacement of 1,314 long tons (1,335 t) and were 1,916 long tons (1,947 t) at full load. The destroyer escorts were 301 feet 0 inches (91.7 m) long at the waterline and 312 feet 0 inches (95.1 m) overall with a beam of 38 feet 0 inches (11.6 m) and a draft of 12 feet 11 inches (3.9 m). The Claud Jones class had an aluminum superstructure, a tripod mast forward and a pole mast further back amidships, with two stacks. (Note: The Claud Jones-ships' displacement is stated by Moore as 1,450 long tons (1,470 t) standard and 1,750 long tons (1,780 t) at full load.)

Following the guidelines given to them, the designers chose a two-shafted diesel-powered ship to maximize cost effectiveness. The Claud Jones class were given four Fairbanks Morse 38ND8 diesel engines rated at 9,200 brake horsepower (6,860 kW). The class had a range of 7,000 nautical miles (12,964 km; 8,055 mi) at 12 knots (22 km/h; 14 mph) and a maximum speed of 22 knots (41 km/h; 25 mph). (Note: Moore states that the vessels had only one shaft, while Gardiner, Chumbley & Budzbon state the ships' engines were rated at 8,700 brake horsepower (6,500 kW).)

The ships were initially armed with two 3-inch (76 mm)/50-caliber guns, one located forward with a closed shield and one located aft with an open shield. (Note: The 50 caliber denotes the length of the gun. This means that the length of the gun barrel is 50 times the bore diameter.) For ASW, the destroyer escorts were equipped with two forward-firing hedgehog anti-submarine mortars, two fixed 12.75-inch (324 mm) torpedo tubes for Mk 32 torpedoes and one depth charge rack placed over the stern. The fixed torpedo tubes were later removed and replaced with two triple tube mounts. In 1961, Charles Berry received a Norwegian-designed Terne III depth charge system deployed via rockets. As KRI Martadinata, her aft 3-inch/50-caliber gun was replaced with Soviet-built anti-aircraft guns, consisted of one 37 mm V-11 twin-barrel gun and one 25 mm 2M-3 twin-barrel gun.

The Claud Jones class was initially equipped with variable depth sonar, AN/SPS-10 and AN/SPS-6 search radars and SQS-29/32 hull-mounted sonar. The variable depth sonar was later removed. The vessels had a ship's company of 175 with 15 officers and 160 enlisted personnel.

== Service history ==
=== United States service ===
USS Charles Berry (DE-1035) was laid down on 29 October 1958, launched on 17 March 1959 by Avondale Marine Ways, Inc., Avondale, Louisiana, under subcontract from American Shipbuilding Co., Lorain, Ohio. She was sponsored by Mrs. C. Berry, and commissioned on 25 November 1959.

Charles Berry arrived at San Diego, her home port, on 3 February 1960, and after shakedown training and overhaul, cleared on 14 June for a tour of duty in the Far East which took her to United Nations trust territories in the charge of the United States, as well as on a good will cruise to Philippines ports. She returned to the West Coast late in 1960.

In October to November 1962, she participated in the blockade of Cuba.

In June 1964 her homeport assignment was changed to Pearl Harbor. Charles Berry along with her sisters were assigned to Escort Division 11. Operating from Pearl Harbor, the ship and her sisters patrolled the Pacific Ocean and the areas around Midway Atoll, Kwajalein Atoll, Johnston Atoll, and even as far as Adak Island.

In August 1965, Charles Berry was deployed to Vietnam. While in Vietnam, she provided naval gunfire support. On one of her tours at Vietnam, the ship experienced a boiler explosion under the radio room which killed one personnel and injured another one.

On 20 September 1970, Charles Berry crossed the International Date Line seven times in 24 hours.

Charles Berry was decommissioned and stricken on 31 January 1974, and in the same day she was transferred to Indonesian Navy.

=== Indonesian service ===
Indonesian Navy acquired the ship on 31 January 1974 and renamed her as KRI Martadinata (342).

The ship participated in Operation Seroja, the invasion of East Timor to oust Fretilin regime. On 25 November 1975, the ship bombarded Atabae and Railaco, guided by spotter in MBB Bo 105 helicopter.

Martadinata was involved in Battle of Dili as naval gunfire support element of Operation Seroja Amphibious Task Force, along with KRI Ratulangi (400) as command ship, KRI Barakuda (817) as sub-chaser, KRI Jayawijaya (921) as repair ship, KRI Sorong (911) as oiler, and KRI Teluk Bone (511) which carried landing forces from 5th Landing Team Battalion of Marine Infantry. On 7 December, Martadinata provided preliminary bombardment on Dili before the landing forces disembarked from Teluk Bone at 04:30 UTC+8, and 30 minutes later the landing at Kampung Alor went smoothly.

During the landing process, the task force were shadowed by two Portuguese Navy frigates, consisted of NRP Afonso de Albuquerque and a João Belo-class frigate. Both Portuguese frigates were already present in Timorese waters since October 1975. Ratulangi, which has four 100 mm guns, keep track of the two frigates, while Martadinata continues to carry on her assignment. The Portuguese frigates were observing the landing process 7 km (3.8 nmi) from the Indonesian ships.

On 10 December, Martadinata assigned as command ship during landings at Laga Beach, 20 km east of Baucau, with KRI Nuku (360) and KRI Lambung Mangkurat (357) providing naval gunfire support. During the second wave of landings, Martadinata rescued 14 out of 22 personnel from a BTR-50 amphibious APC that sank into Wetar Strait due to faulty engine and leaking hull caused by lack of maintenance and spare parts.

Martadinata was decommissioned on 8 September 2005.

== Awards ==
As Charles Berry, the ship earned two battle stars during Vietnam War. She also earned the following awards:

Meritorious Unit Commendation with one battle star
National Defense Service Medal	Vietnam Service Medal with one battle star	Vietnam Campaign Medal
