= Don-class submarine tender =

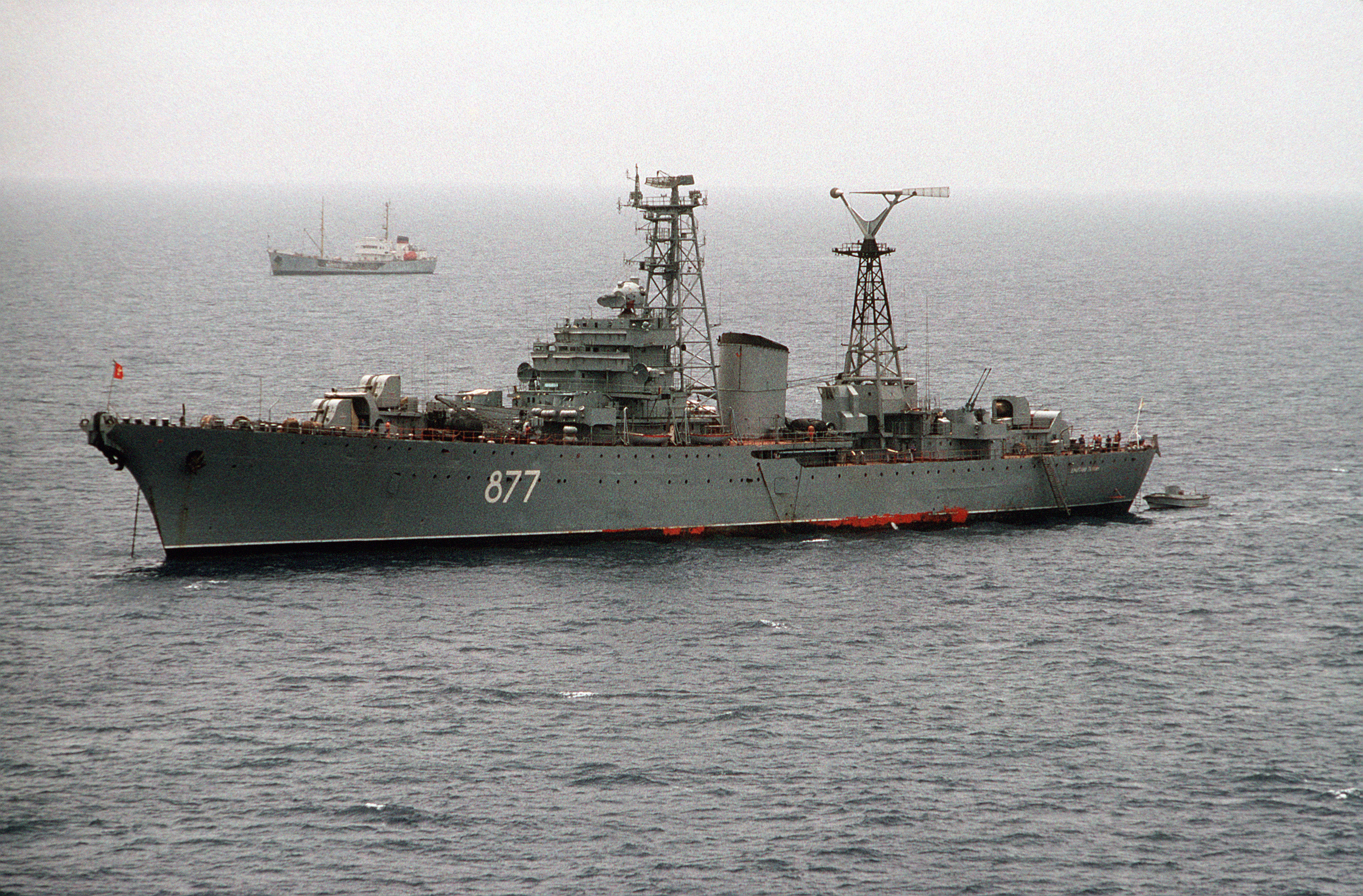
- Dmitriy Galkin in 1988

Class overview
- Name: Don class (Project 310 Batur)
- Builders: Nikolayev Shipyard
- Operators: Soviet Navy; Russian Navy; Indonesian Navy
- Succeeded by: Ugra class
- Built: 1956–1961
- In commission: 1958–1998
- Completed: 7
- Retired: 7

General characteristics
- Type: Submarine tender
- Displacement: 5,030 t (4,950 long tons) standard; 7,150 t (7,040 long tons) full load
- Length: 140 m (460 ft)
- Beam: 17.7 m (58 ft)
- Draught: 6.4 m (21 ft)
- Propulsion: 4 diesel engines, 8,000 hp (6,000 kW)
- Speed: 17 knots (31 km/h; 20 mph)
- Range: 21,000 nmi (39,000 km; 24,000 mi) at 10 knots (19 km/h; 12 mph)
- Complement: 300
- Sensors & processing systems: Radar: Hawk Screech, Slim Net
- Electronic warfare & decoys: 2 Watch Dog ECM systems, Vee Cone communication system
- Armament: 4 × 100 mm (4 in) guns; 4 × 57 mm (2.2 in) guns,

The Don-class submarine tender was the NATO reporting name for a group of seven submarine tenders built for the Soviet Navy in the late 1950s. The Soviet designation was Project 310 Batur. Evolving from a need for dispersed basing of submarines in the advent of a nuclear war, the ships were designed to support distant operations of the Soviet Union's submarine fleet, capable of repairing and resupplying. However, the Soviets returned to stationary basing of their submarines and the Don class were later converted into flagships. One vessel was exported to Indonesia in 1962 and due to the ship's heavy armament, was used primarily for patrol duties. The ships of the Don class were removed from service in the mid 1990s and broken up for scrap.

== Design ==
With the advent of nuclear war and the danger that stationary bases faced, the Soviet Navy sought to disperse the fleet while still maintaining functionality. As a result, the Soviet Central Design Bureau came up with Plavuchaya Baza (Russian) meaning "Floating Base" in the mid 1950s to serve as distant logistic support for submarines. Designated Project 310 Batur by the Soviets and the NATO reporting name Don class, their chief designer was V. I. Mogilevich. Each ship was capable of providing emergency repairs to submarine hulls, and resupplying and rearming up to four submarines of projects 611 and 613 each. Each ship of the class had storage space for 42 533-millimetre (21.0 in) torpedoes. (Note: Couhat states the ships can service 8 to 12 submarines.)

The sources disagree on the dimensions and displacement of the ships. Kuzin & Nikolsky state the vessels had a standard displacement of 5,030 tonnes (4,950 long tons) and 7,150 t (7,040 long tons) fully loaded and measured 140 metres (459 ft 4 in) long with a beam of 17.67 m (58 ft 0 in) and a draught of 5.6 m (18 ft 4 in). Sharpe has the Don-class tenders displacing 5,100 t (5,000 long tons) standard and 6,900 t (6,800 long tons) fully loaded and measuring the same length and beam as Kuzin & Nikolsky but with a draught of 5.4 m (17 ft 9 in). Couhat has the tonnages as 6,720 t (6,610 long tons) standard and 9,000 t (8,900 long tons) fully loaded and measuring the same length and beam but with a draught of 6.4 m (21 ft 0 in).

The Don-class tenders were powered by diesel-electric system comprising four diesel engines and two electric motors turning two propeller shafts creating 6,000 kilowatts (8,000 bhp). (Note: Kuzin & Nikolsky have the power as 3,000 kW (4,000 hp), but it is unclear if that is the total power.) This gives the ships a maximum speed of 16 to 17 knots (30 to 31 km/h; 18 to 20 mph) and a range of 21,000 nautical miles (39,000 km; 24,000 mi) at 10 knots (19 km/h; 12 mph). (Note: Kuzin & Nikolsky have the range as 3,000 nmi (5,600 km; 3,500 mi) at 12.5 kn (23.2 km/h; 14.4 mph).) The tenders had an endurance of 40 days at sea. The ships had a complement of 350 including 28 officers and additional crew space for up to 394 headquarters/submarine personnel. (Note: Couhat and Sharpe both have the crew number as 300 with up to 450 additional personnel.) To resupply the submarines, the vessels had a single 100-ton crane fitted at the bow, one 10-ton crane, two 5-ton cranes and two 1-ton cranes.

The submarine tenders had varying armament throughout their careers and between ships. The majority were armed with four single-mounted B-34USMA 100 mm (3.9 in)/56 dual-purpose guns (Note: The /56 calibre denotes the length of the gun. This means that the length of the gun barrel is 56 times the bore diameter.) and four twin-mounted ZIF 31B 57 mm (2.2 in)/70 anti-air (AA) guns. Viktor Kotelnikov was armed with only two 100 mm guns and Magadansky Komsomolets had none. Kamchatsky Komsomolets and Fyodor Vidyaev both ported four twin 25 mm (0.98 in)/80 AA guns. The 100 mm guns had 40° elevation and could 15 shells per minute to a distance of 16 kilometres (9.9 mi). Each shell was 15.6 kilograms (34 lb). The 57 mm guns had 90° elevation and could fire 120 rounds per minute to 8 km (5.0 mi) with each round weighing 2.8 kg (6.2 lb). The 25 mm guns had 85° elevation and could fire 270 rounds per minute to 3 km (1.9 mi). Those with guns removed had instead a helicopter landing pad over the stern. On the final ship of the class, an OSA-M AA missile system was installed.

Those Don-class ships equipped with the 100 mm guns were given two Hawk Screech fire control radars operating on the I band. For surface search, they had Slim Net radar operating on the E/F bands, though some were equipped with Strut Curve operating only on the F band. For identification of friend or foe, they had Square Head and High Pole A systems installed. For electronic support measures, the tenders had two Watch Dog systems mounted.

== Construction and career ==
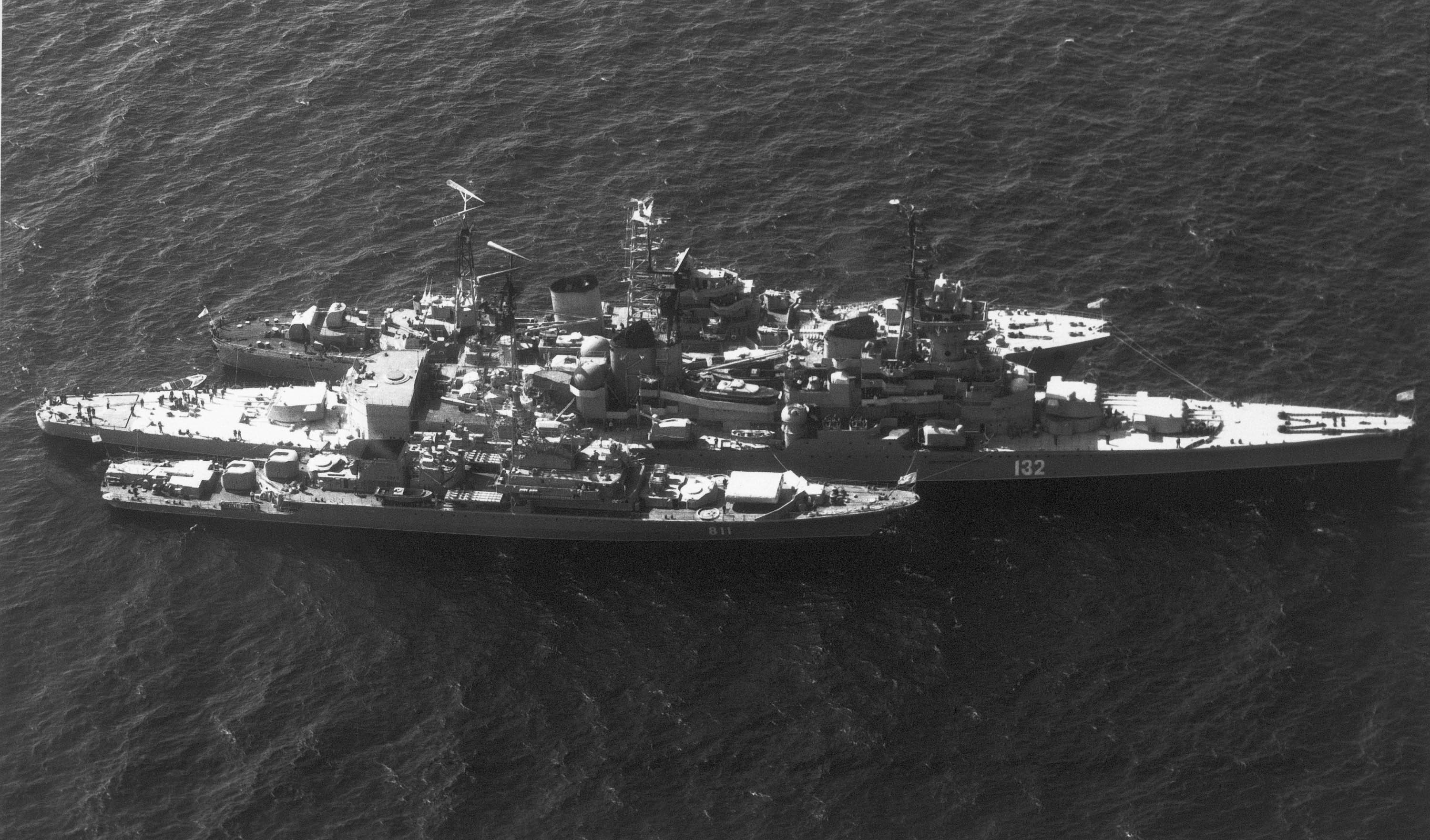
Magomed Gadzhiev with the frigate Bezzavetny and cruiser Zhdanov

Seven ships were built for the Soviet Navy with one ship (Nikolay Kartashov) exported to Indonesia in 1962. Those ships that were named, were named for military personnel killed in World War II. All seven ships were constructed at the Ivan Nosenko #444 Black Sea Shipyard in Nikolayev, Soviet Union. Following the expansion of stationary naval bases by the Soviet Navy, some of the vessels were converted to flagships. Fyodor Vidyaev and Dmitriy Galkin were given Vee Cone antenna for long range communications.

== Ships in class ==
Construction data
Name	Builder	Laid down	Launched	Completed	Fate	Notes
Dmitriy Galkin	Black Sea Shipyard, Nikolayev, Soviet Union	24 April 1959	31 March 1960	25 December 1960	Stricken 1994	
Fyodor Vidyaev	Black Sea Shipyard, Nikolayev, Soviet Union	24 March 1956	26 April 1957	30 September 1958	8 July 1996	
Batur (Note: Sharpe has the ship's former name being Mikhail Tukachevsky.)	Black Sea Shipyard, Nikolayev, Soviet Union	6 October 1955	29 November 1956	28 March 1958	28 April 1998	Renamed PKZ-124 in 1966, Kamchatsky Komsomolets in 1979 and PB-9 in 1992.
Magomed Gadzhiev	Black Sea Shipyard, Nikolayev, Soviet Union	10 November 1956	25 June 1957	1 July 1960	Stricken 1994	
PB-3	Black Sea Shipyard, Nikolayev, Soviet Union	8 June 1960	7 October 1961	30 September 1962	Stricken 1992	Renamed Magadansky Komsomolets in 1970 and PB-27 in 1991.
Viktor Kotelnikov	Black Sea Shipyard, Nikolayev, Soviet Union	19 June 1956	26 June 1957	11 December 1959	Stricken 1994	
Nikolay Kartashov	Black Sea Shipyard, Nikolayev, Soviet Union	18 December 1959	20 December 1960	31 May 1962	Transferred to Indonesia in 1962	Renamed KRI Ratulangi in 1962. Discarded in 1990.

== Export ==
Beginning in 1958, Indonesia began a closer relationship with the Eastern Bloc during the Cold War. A result of this closer relationship saw the transfer of nearly 100 naval vessels from the Soviet Union. Among the ships transferred was a Don-class submarine tender, the ex Nikolay Kartashov in 1962, arriving in Indonesia in July of that year and 14 Project 613 submarines. Renamed KRI Ratulangi, the vessel had the same specifications as the other Don-class tenders and was armed with 100 mm, 57 mm and 25 mm guns. The ship was equipped with different sensors, carrying Slim Net radar for air/surface search operating on the E/F bands and RCA SPN 11 (CR-103) for surface search operating on the I/J bands and for fire control, Sun Visor B radar operating on the G/H and I bands.

Ratulangi was used as a submarine support ship and escort vessel. Due to ship's heavy armament, the tender was used as a patrol vessel. Ratulangi was discarded in 1990, the same year the last Project 613 submarine was discarded by the Indonesian Navy.

== See also ==
- List of ships of the Soviet Navy
- List of ships of Russia by project number
