= Soviet submarine tender Magadansky Komsomolets =

Don-class submarine tender

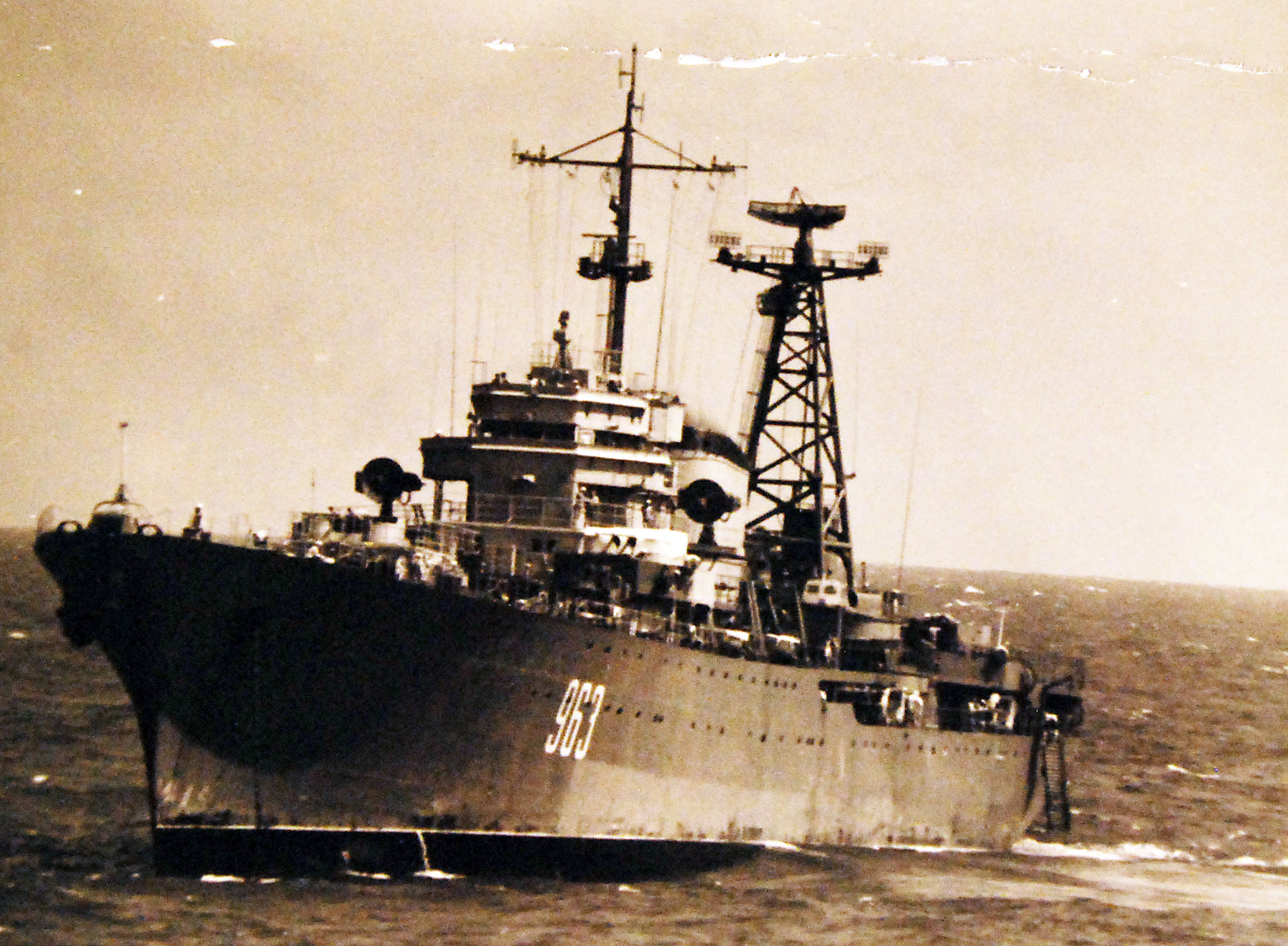
- PB-3 in April 1970

History

Russia
- Name: PB-3; (ПБ-3)
- Builder: Black Sea Shipyard
- Yard number: 620
- Laid down: 8 June 1960
- Launched: 7 October 1961
- Commissioned: 30 September 1962
- Decommissioned: 1992
- Renamed: Magadansky Komsomolets (1979); PB-27 (1992)
- Namesake: Magadan Komsomolets
- Identification: See Pennant numbers
- Fate: Scrapped

General characteristics
- Class & type: Don-class submarine tender
- Displacement: 2,316 tonnes (2,279 long tons) standard; 3,066 tonnes (3,018 long tons) full load
- Length: 140 m (460 ft)
- Beam: 17.7 m (58 ft)
- Draught: 6.4 m (21 ft)
- Propulsion: 4 × diesel engines, 8,000 hp (6,000 kW)
- Speed: 17 knots (31 km/h; 20 mph)
- Range: 21,000 km (11,000 nmi; 13,000 mi) at 10 knots (19 km/h; 12 mph)
- Complement: 300-450
- Sensors & processing systems: Hawk Screech; Slim Net; Rys-1
- Electronic warfare & decoys: 2 × Watch dog ECM systems; Vee cone communication system
- Armament: as designed: 4 × single 100 mm (4 in) guns; 4 × dual 57 mm (2.2 in) guns; as modernized: 2 × single 100 mm (4 in) guns; 4 × dual 57 mm (2.2 in) guns
- Aircraft carried: 1 × Kamov Ka-25
- Aviation facilities: Helipad

Magadansky Komsomolets was a Don-class submarine tender of the Soviet Navy.

== Development and design ==
The project of the submarine tenders was developed in the central design bureau "Baltsudoproekt" under the leadership of the chief designer V. I. Mogilevich. The main observer from the Navy was Captain 1st Rank G.V. Zemlyanichenko. The construction of the lead ship was completed in Nikolaev at the Black Sea shipyard in 1958. In total, seven tenders of Project 310 were built for the Soviet Navy in 1958–1963.

Don-class submarine tenders had a total displacement of 7,150 tons, and 5,030 tons when empty.

Two-shaft diesel-electric main power plant with a capacity of 4,000 hp, which provided the ship with a top speed of 16 knots. The vessel had a maximum cruising range of 3,000 nautical miles (at a speed of 12.5 knots) with an endurance of 40 days. The crew consisted of 350 people, including 28 officers.

A Don class could tend to four submarines of Project 611 or Project 613. The equipment of the tender was capable of providing navigational and emergency repair of the hull, mechanisms and weapons and storage of 42 533-mm torpedoes in a special room. A 100-ton crane was housed at the bow of the ship.

Defensive armament consisted of four single-barreled 100-mm artillery mounts B-34USMA and four 57-mm twin installations ZIF-31 with the Ryf control radar, the sonar station was not provided. After modernization, on two ships, instead of two aft 100-mm installations, a take-off and landing pad was equipped for basing one Ka-25 helicopter. On the last vessel of the series, the Osa-M air defense missile system was installed.

== Construction and career ==
The ship was built at Black Sea Shipyard in Mykolaiv and was launched on 25 June 1957 and commissioned on 1 July 1960.

On March 4, 1975 a garbage fire occurred while the vessel was wintering in Avacha bay. This caused the accumulation of enough smoke to make vision impossible. Upon opening bulkheads to try and vent smoke, crews invertedly provided the fire with more oxygen, increasing its intensity. The senior political officer remained in charge for the duration of the fire, who despite not having an adequate understanding of the layout of the vessel. Owing to confusion and a misunderstanding of the vessel's instrumentation an order to flood the ships magazine was given, but cancelled before being executed. During the fire multiple crew members received burns to their hands.

In 1979, she was renamed Magadansky Komsomolets.

In 1992, she was renamed PB-27.

She was decommissioned on 24 August 1993 and later in 1994, she was moored to the pier in Sukharnaya Bay until finally towed to Dokovaya Bay for dismantling.

=== Pennant numbers ===
Date	Pennant number
1965	701
1970	963
1972	970
1979	968
	941
	805
1981	825
1984	839
1987	812
1990	825

== See also ==
- List of ships of the Soviet Navy
- List of ships of Russia by project number
