= Soviet submarine tender Batur =

Don-class submarine tender

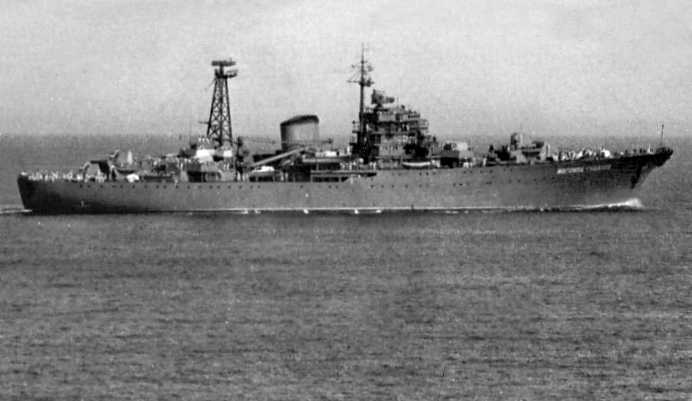
- A Don-class submarine tender of Soviet Navy in 1967

History

Russia
- Name: Batur; (Батур)
- Builder: Black Sea Shipyard
- Yard number: 614
- Laid down: 6 October 1955
- Launched: 29 November 1956
- Commissioned: 28 March 1958
- Decommissioned: 28 April 1998
- Renamed: Kamchatsky Komsomolets (1966); (Камчатский комсомолец); PB-9 (1992)
- Namesake: Kamchatka Komsomolets
- Identification: See Pennant numbers
- Fate: Scrapped

General characteristics
- Class & type: Don-class submarine tender
- Displacement: 2,316 tonnes (2,279 long tons) standard; 3,066 tonnes (3,018 long tons) full load
- Length: 140 m (459 ft 4 in)
- Beam: 17.7 m (58 ft 1 in)
- Draught: 6.4 m (21 ft 0 in)
- Propulsion: 4 × diesel engines, 8,000 hp (6,000 kW)
- Speed: 17 knots (31 km/h; 20 mph)
- Range: 21,000 nmi (39,000 km; 24,000 mi) at 10 knots (19 km/h; 12 mph)
- Complement: 300
- Sensors & processing systems: Hawk Screech; Slim Net; Rys-1
- Electronic warfare & decoys: 2 × Watch dog ECM systems; Vee cone communication system
- Armament: 4 × single 100 mm (4 in) guns; 4 × dual 57 mm (2.2 in) guns

Batur was a Don-class submarine tender of the Soviet Navy.

== Development and design ==
The project of the submarine tenders was developed in the central design bureau "Baltsudoproekt" under the leadership of the chief designer V. I. Mogilevich. The main observer from the Navy was Captain 1st Rank G.V. Zemlyanichenko. The construction of the lead ship was completed in Nikolaev at the Black Sea shipyard in 1958. In total, seven tenders of project 310 were built for the Soviet Navy between 1958 and 1963.

Don-class submarine tenders had a total displacement of 7,150 t (7,040 long tons) and 5,030 t (4,950 long tons) while they were empty. Their main dimensions were a maximum length of 140 m (459 ft 4 in), a beam of 17.67 m (58 ft 0 in) and a draft of 5.6 m (18 ft 4 in). They had a two-shaft diesel-electric main power plant with a capacity of 4,000 hp (3,000 kW) which provided the ship with a full speed of 16 knots (30 km/h; 18 mph). The cruising range reached 3,000 nautical miles (5,600 km; 3,500 mi) at a speed of 12.5 knots (23.2 km/h; 14.4 mph) and an endurance of 40 days. The crew consisted of 350 people, including 28 officers.

They could serve four submarines of Project 611 or Project 613. The equipment of the floating base was capable of providing navigational and emergency repair of the hull, mechanisms and weapons and storage of 42 533 millimetres (21.0 in) torpedoes in a special room. A 100-ton crane was housed at the bow of the ship.

The defensive armaments of the ships consisted of four single-barreled 100 mm (3.9 in) artillery mounts B-34USMA and four 57 mm (2.2 in) twin installations ZIF-31 with the Ryf control radar, the sonar station was not provided. After modernization, on two ships, instead of two aft 100 mm installations, a take-off and landing pad was equipped for basing one Ka-25 helicopter. On the last floating base of the series, the Osa-M air defense missile system was installed.

== Construction and career ==
The ship was built at the Black Sea Shipyard in Mykolaiv and was launched on 29 November 1956 and commissioned into the Black Sea Fleet on 28 March 1958.

In 1960, she was transferred to the Pacific Fleet.

She was renamed Kamchatsky Komsomolets on 12 March 1966.

She was renamed PB-9 on 15 February 1992.

She was decommissioned on 28 April 1998 and later scrapped.

=== Pennant numbers ===
Date	Pennant number
	991
	920
1972	803
1974	944
1981	833
1984	800
1987	817
1990	801
1997	806

== See also ==
- List of ships of the Soviet Navy
- List of ships of Russia by project number
