= Soviet submarine tender Magomed Gadzhiev =

Don-class submarine tender

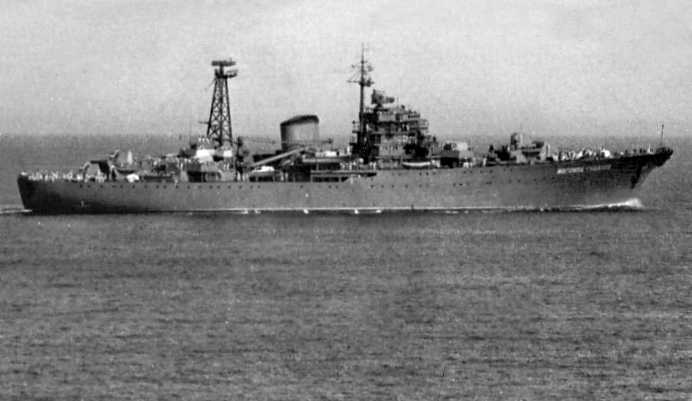
- Magomed Gadzhiev in 1967

History

Russia
- Name: Magomed Gadzhiev; (Магомед Гаджиев)
- Namesake: Magomet Gadzhiyev
- Builder: Black Sea Shipyard
- Yard number: 617
- Laid down: 10 November 1956
- Launched: 25 June 1957
- Commissioned: 1 July 1960
- Decommissioned: 24 August 1993
- Identification: See Pennant numbers
- Fate: Scrapped

General characteristics
- Class & type: Don-class submarine tender
- Displacement: 2,316 tonnes (2,279 long tons) standard; 3,066 tonnes (3,018 long tons) full load
- Length: 140 m (460 ft)
- Beam: 17.7 m (58 ft)
- Draught: 6.4 m (21 ft)
- Propulsion: 4 × diesel engines, 8,000 hp (6,000 kW)
- Speed: 17 knots (31 km/h; 20 mph)
- Range: 21,000 km (11,000 nmi; 13,000 mi) at 10 knots (19 km/h; 12 mph)
- Complement: 300-450
- Sensors & processing systems: Hawk Screech; Slim Net; Rys-1
- Electronic warfare & decoys: 2 × Watch dog ECM systems; Vee cone communication system
- Armament: 4 × single 100 mm (4 in) guns; 4 × dual 57 mm (2.2 in) guns

Magomed Gadzhiev was a Don-class submarine tender of the Soviet Navy.

== Development and design ==
The project of the submarine tenders was developed in the central design bureau "Baltsudoproekt" under the leadership of the chief designer V. I. Mogilevich. The main observer from the Navy was Captain 1st Rank G.V. Zemlyanichenko. The construction of the lead ship was completed in Nikolaev at the Black Sea shipyard in 1958. In total, seven tenders of project 310 were built for the Soviet Navy in 1958-1963.

Don-class submarine tenders had a total displacement of 7150 tons and 5030 tons while they're empty. Main dimensions: maximum length - 140 m, width - 17.67 m, draft - 5.6 m. Two-shaft diesel-electric main power plant with a capacity of 4000 hp. with. provided the ship with a full speed of 16 knots. The cruising range reached 3000 nautical miles (at a speed of 12.5 knots), autonomy - 40 days. The crew consisted of 350 people, including 28 officers.

They could serve four submarines of Project 611 or Project 613. The equipment of the floating base was capable of providing navigational and emergency repair of the hull, mechanisms and weapons and storage of 42 533-mm torpedoes in a special room. A 100-ton crane was housed at the bow of the ship.

The defensive armaments of the ships consisted of four single-barreled 100-mm artillery mounts B-34USMA and four 57-mm twin installations ZIF-31 with the Ryf control radar, the sonar station was not provided. After modernization, on two ships, instead of two aft 100-mm installations, a take-off and landing pad was equipped for basing one Ka-25 helicopter. On the last floating base of the series, the Osa-M air defense missile system was installed.

== Construction and career ==
The ship was built at Black Sea Shipyard in Mykolaiv and was launched on 25 June 1957 and commissioned on 1 July 1960.

She was decommissioned on 24 August 1993 and later in 1994, she was moored to the pier in Sukharnaya Bay until finally towed to Dokovaya Bay for dismantling.

=== Pennant numbers ===
Date	Pennant number
	57
	505
	597
	918
	919
	928
	985
1976	989
1983	907
1986	879
1989	919
1990	877
1992	867

== Gallery ==
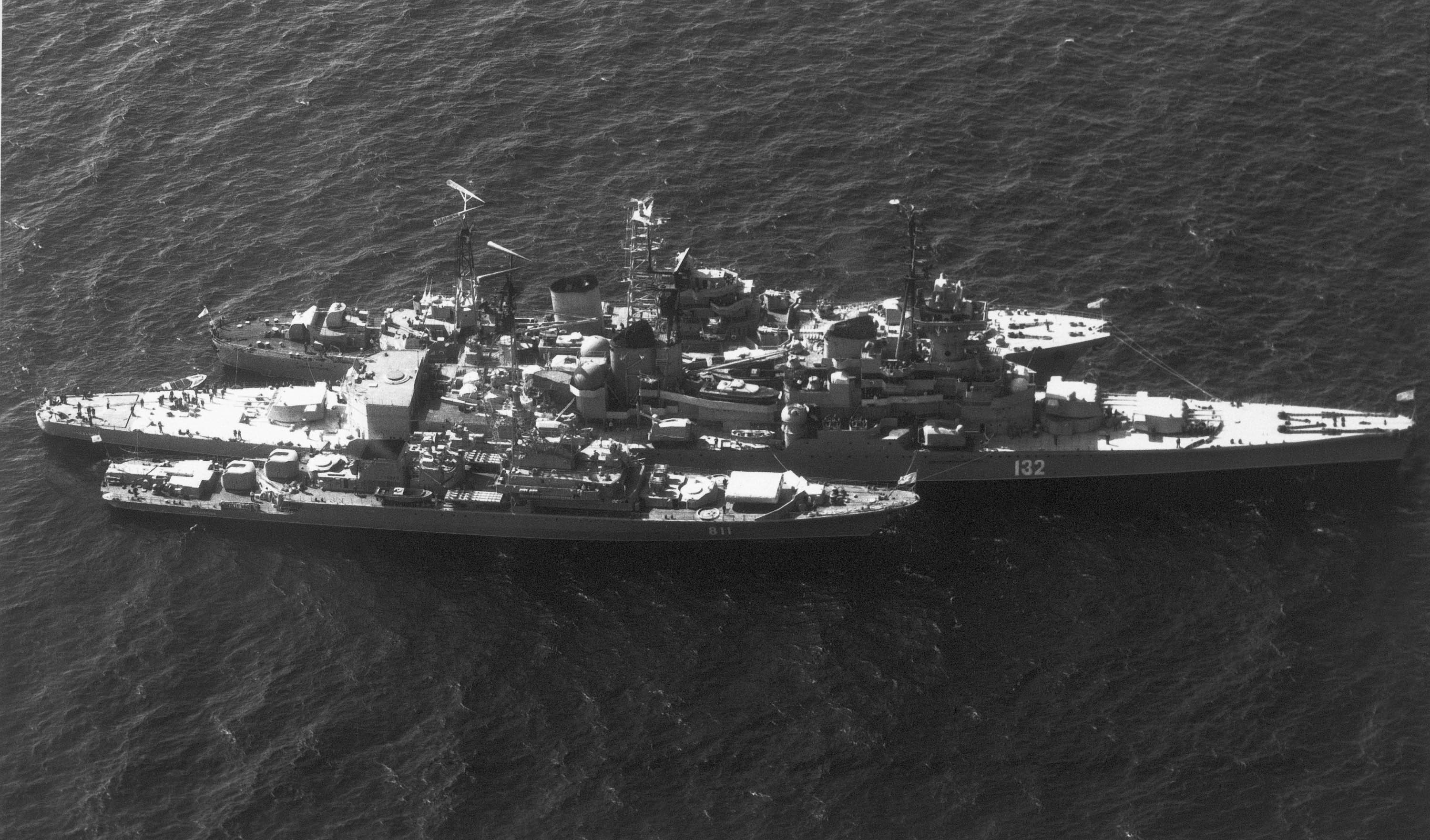
Magomed Gadzhiev, Bezzavetny and Zhdanov on 30 October 1985

== See also ==
- Submarine tender
- Don-class submarine tender
- List of ships of the Soviet Navy
- List of ships of Russia by project number
