= Battle of Dili =

Part of the 1975 Indonesian invasion of East Timor

Invasion of Dili
- Part of the Indonesian invasion of East Timor
Date	7 December 1975
Location	Dili, East Timor
Result	Indonesian victory

Belligerents
Indonesia	East Timor

Commanders and leaders
Soeweno	Paulino Gama

Strength
Initial invasion ~1,000; 4 warships Following weeks 10,000–20,000	Unknown

Casualties and losses
57 killed	122 killed 365 captured

The Indonesian invasion of Dili occurred on 7 December 1975 when Indonesian marines and paratroopers landed in the East Timorese capital of Dili. The attack was the start of a military operation which resulted in the Indonesian occupation of East Timor.

== Battle ==
Indonesian navy vessels consisted of the command ship KRI Ratulangi, corvette KRI Barakuda, destroyer escort KRI Martadinata and repair ship KRI Jaya Wijaya arrived off the coast of Dili around 02:00. Two Portuguese Navy vessels consisted of the frigate NRP Afonso de Albuquerque and corvette João Roby were also present, but the ships had covered their cannons and did not engage with the Indonesians. On 03:00, city lights of Dili were turned off - which the Indonesian commander took as a sign that the ships had been discovered - and the ships started shelling the city. The landing ship KRI Teluk Bone was also present, carrying several hundred Timorese partisans and regular Indonesian marines.

At around 04:30, 400 Indonesian marines landed in amphibious tanks and personnel carriers in Kampung Alor beach. They faced minimal resistance, and by 07:00 they had secured the surrounding areas.

The paratroopers consisted of 550 soldiers in ten Lockheed C-130 Hercules aircraft which took off from Iswahyudi Air Force Base in Madiun. They originated from Kopassus' (then Kopasandha) paratrooper command and Kostrad's 501st infantry battalion. The planes approached Dili from the east and began dropping soldiers on 05:45. One loadmaster was killed by FRETILIN fire, and 72 soldiers aborted the drop. The paratroopers were shot at before they reached ground, following orders from Gama, and were exposed to friendly fire from the marines.

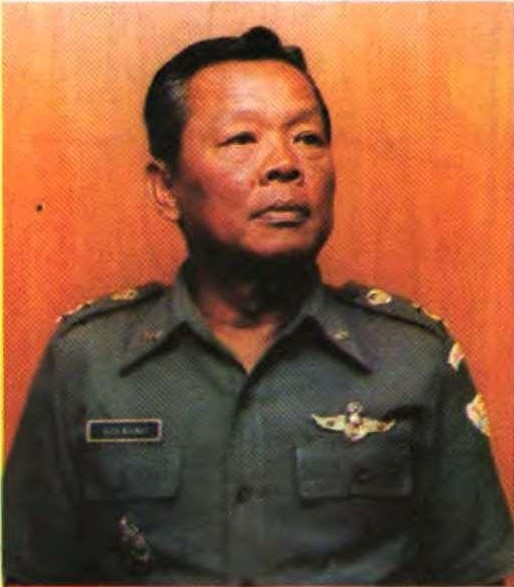
Brigadier General Soewono, led the Indonesian military during the Battle of Dili.

After the first sortie was dropped, the planes returned to Penfui airfield in Kupang, and a second sortie consisting of five planes was launched. The second wave of paratroopers, however, proceeded to fire at Indonesian soldiers moving towards Dili airfield while the marines began also firing back at them. According to official reports, the friendly fire incident resulted in no fatalities.

== Casualties and aftermath ==
Following the battle, the Indonesian casualty count was 35 killed from the first sortie, and another 22 from the second sortie. On the FRETILIN side, Indonesian forces reported 122 killed and 365 captured. Three days after the battle, the city of Baucau was similarly attacked and captured.

Many Indonesian commanders complained about the inaccurate and poor-quality of intelligence provided. The commander of the airborne task force remarked that he was informed of the enemy being "the equivalent of hansip".

Due to the invasion, Portugal broke diplomatic relations with Indonesia on the same day.
