= Soviet submarine tender Fyodor Vidyaev =

Don-class submarine tender

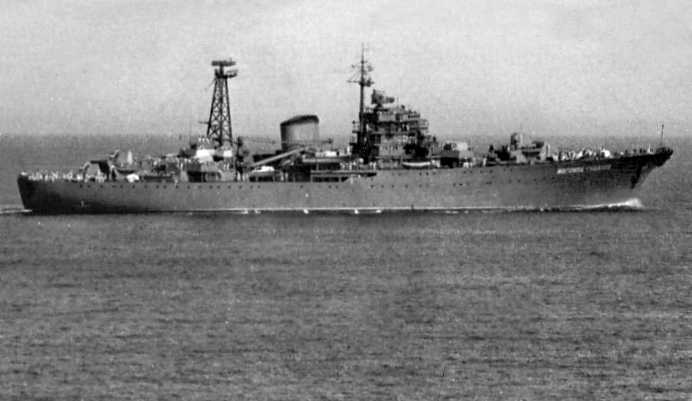
- A Don-class submarine tender of Soviet Navy in 1967

History

Russia
- Name: Fyodor Vidyaev; (Фёдор Видяев)
- Namesake: Fyodor Vidyayev
- Builder: Black Sea Shipyard
- Yard number: 615
- Laid down: 24 March 1956
- Launched: 26 April 1957
- Commissioned: 30 September 1958
- Decommissioned: 8 July 1996
- Identification: See Pennant numbers
- Fate: Scrapped

General characteristics
- Class & type: Don-class submarine tender
- Displacement: 2,316 tonnes (2,279 long tons) standard; 3,066 tonnes (3,018 long tons) full load
- Length: 140 m (460 ft)
- Beam: 17.7 m (58 ft)
- Draught: 6.4 m (21 ft)
- Propulsion: 4 × diesel engines, 8,000 hp (6,000 kW)
- Speed: 17 knots (31 km/h; 20 mph)
- Range: 21,000 km (11,000 nmi; 13,000 mi) at 10 knots (19 km/h; 12 mph)
- Complement: 300-450
- Sensors & processing systems: Hawk Screech; Slim Net; Rys-1
- Electronic warfare & decoys: 2 × Watch dog ECM systems; Vee cone communication system
- Armament: 4 × single 100 mm (4 in) guns; 4 × dual 57 mm (2.2 in) guns

Fyodor Vidyaev was a Don-class submarine tender of the Soviet Navy.

== Development and design ==
The project of the submarine tenders was developed in the central design bureau "Baltsudoproekt" under the leadership of the chief designer V. I. Mogilevich. The main observer from the Navy was Captain 1st Rank G.V. Zemlyanichenko. The construction of the lead ship was completed in Nikolaev at the Black Sea shipyard in 1958. In total, seven tenders of project 310 were built for the Soviet Navy in 1958-1963.

Don-class submarine tenders had a total displacement of 7150 tons and 5030 tons while they're empty. Main dimensions: maximum length - 140 m, width - 17.67 m, draft - 5.6 m. Two-shaft diesel-electric main power plant with a capacity of 4000 hp. with. provided the ship with a full speed of 16 knots. The cruising range reached 3000 nautical miles (at a speed of 12.5 knots), autonomy - 40 days. The crew consisted of 350 people, including 28 officers.

They could serve four submarines of Project 611 or Project 613. The equipment of the floating base was capable of providing navigational and emergency repair of the hull, mechanisms and weapons and storage of 42 533-mm torpedoes in a special room. A 100-ton crane was housed at the bow of the ship.

The defensive armaments of the ships consisted of four single-barreled 100-mm artillery mounts B-34USMA and four 57-mm twin installations ZIF-31 with the Ryf control radar, the sonar station was not provided. After modernization, on two ships, instead of two aft 100-mm installations, a take-off and landing pad was equipped for basing one Ka-25 helicopter. On the last floating base of the series, the Osa-M air defense missile system was installed.

== Construction and career ==
The ship was built at Black Sea Shipyard in Mykolaiv and was launched on 26 April 1957 and commissioned into the Northern Fleet on 30 September 1958.

She was later transferred to the Black Sea Fleet on 26 July 1992.

She was decommissioned on 8 July 1996 and later scrapped.

=== Pennant numbers ===
Date	Pennant number
1958	B-510
	039
	833
1972	913
1973	920
1974	932
1976	905
1981	939
1987	979
	916
	800
1993	877

== See also ==
- Submarine tender
- Don-class submarine tender
- List of ships of the Soviet Navy
- List of ships of Russia by project number
