= Adam Rimashevsky =

Russian naval officer (born 1952)

Adam Adamovich Rimashevsky
- Born: 25 May 1952 (age 73); Gozbishchi, Uzda district, Minsk Oblast, Byelorussian SSR, Soviet Union
- Allegiance: Soviet Union; Russia
- Branch: Soviet Navy; Russian Navy
- Service years: 1969-2012
- Rank: Vice-Admiral
- Commands: Bezukoriznenny; Zhdanov; Ushakov Baltic Higher Naval School; Higher Special Officer Classes of the Navy; Kuznetsov Naval Academy
- Awards: Order of Military Merit; Order "For Service to the Homeland in the Armed Forces of the USSR" Third Class

Adam Adamovich Rimashevsky (Russian: Адам Адамович Римашевский; born 25 May 1952) is a retired officer of the Russian Navy. He holds the rank of admiral, and served as commander of the Ushakov Baltic Higher Naval School from 1998 to 2003, the Higher Special Officer Classes of the Navy from 2003 to 2008, and the Kuznetsov Naval Academy from 2008 to 2012.

== Biography ==
Rimashevsky was born on 25 May 1952 in the village of Gozbishchi, Uzda district, Minsk Oblast, in what was then the Byelorussian Soviet Socialist Republic, in the Soviet Union. He entered the Soviet Navy, studying at the Nakhimov Black Sea Higher Naval School in Sevastopol from 1969 to 1974. He graduated from the anti-submarine faculty with a specialty as a military engineer-electromechanic, and was assigned to the Black Sea Fleet to serve aboard the Kashin-class destroyer Komsomolets Ukrainy. Initially commander of the mine-torpedo warhead group, he rose through the ranks and positions to eventually command the Skory-class destroyer Bezukoriznenny, and then the Sverdlov-class cruiser Zhdanov from 1987 to 1989. Soviet warships from the Black Sea Fleet were often deployed on long-distance voyages into the Mediterranean and the Atlantic, with Rimashevsky taking part in ten such cruises. He also undertook further studies, completing the Higher Special Officer Classes of the Navy in 1980, and graduating from the Grechko Naval Academy in 1987.

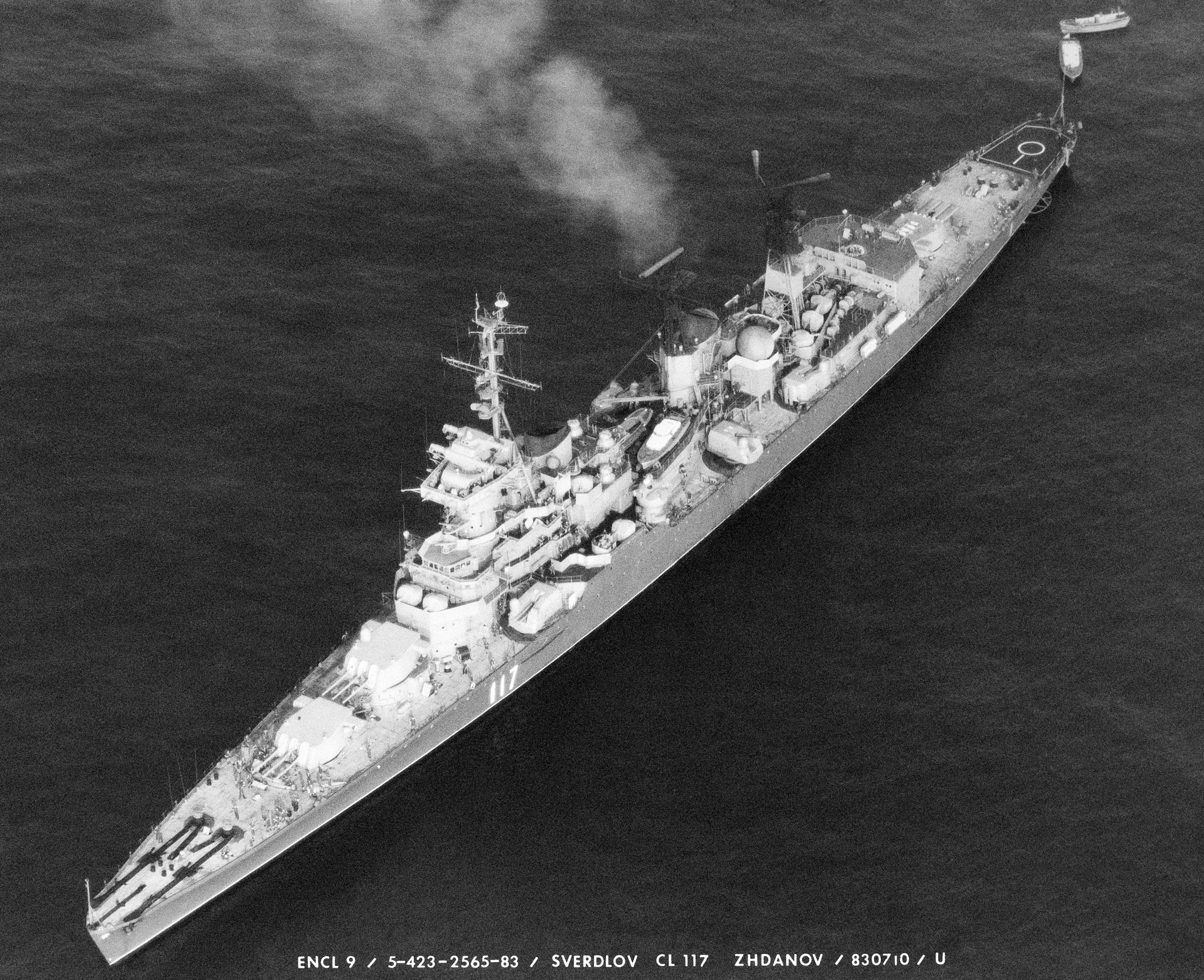
The Sverdlov-class cruiser Zhdanov, Rimashevsky's command from 1987 to 1989

In September 1989, Rimashevsky moved to staff positions, becoming a deputy chief and head of department on the Black Sea Fleet Staff. He studied at the Military Academy of the General Staff in 1990, and in December that year was appointed chief of staff and deputy commander of the Baltic Fleet's Anti-Submarine Ship Division, operating out of Baltiysk. He held this role during the dissolution of the Soviet Union in 1991, and the fleet's transition to a Russian force. In February 1994, Rimashevsky was appointed deputy chief of staff of the Baltic Fleet for combat control, and chief of the Baltic Fleet Command Post. He left in early 1998 to become head of the Ushakov Baltic Higher Naval School. In this role he oversaw the expansion of the school's operations, and numerous educational reforms. He also further developed his own academic career, completing his dissertation on the topic "Organization and methods of operational and combat training of combat shift crews of the fleet command post in modern conditions" in 1999, and on 22 October 1999 being awarded the degree of candidate of military sciences.

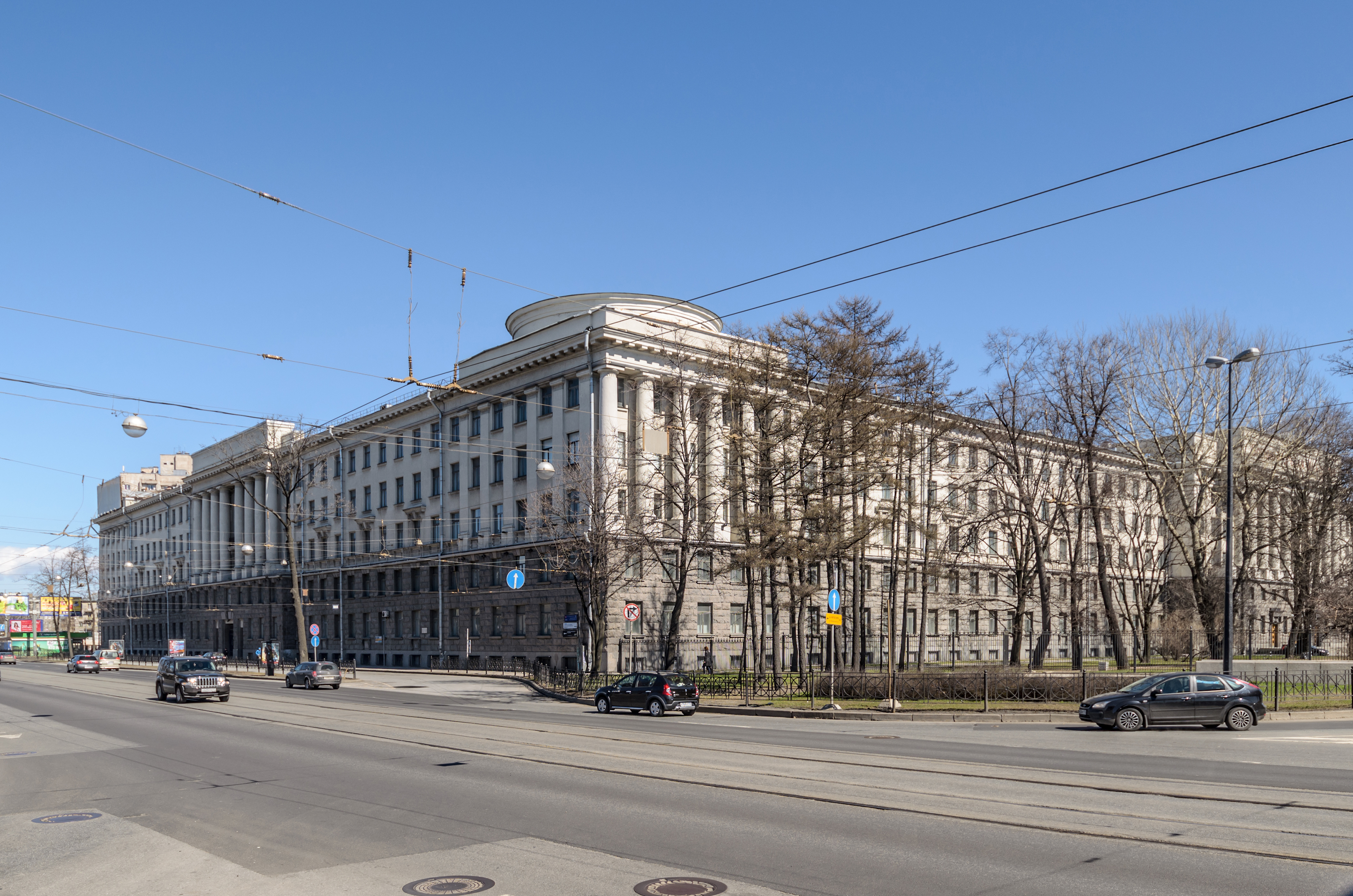
The Kuznetsov Naval Academy. Rimashevsky was head of the academy between 2008 and 2012.

Rimashevsky undertook further studies at the Military Academy of the General Staff in 2003, and in May that year took up the position of head of the Higher Special Officer Classes of the Navy. He defended his dissertation on "the development of pedagogical technology in the automated control system of the educational process of a higher naval educational institution" on 3 June 2004, and on 25 February 2005 was awarded the degree of doctor of pedagogical sciences. From 19 October 2005, Rimashevsky was also a professor in Higher Special Officer Classes's Department of Combat Training and Ship Control, concurrently with being head of the classes. He left in June 2008 to take up the post of head of the Kuznetsov Naval Academy. During his time in this role, Rimashevsky became chairman of the Council of Military Universities of Saint Petersburg on 25 December 2009, and on 27 January 2010, became a member of the Presidium of the Council of Rectors of Universities of Saint Petersburg. He retired from military service on 28 May 2012, but remained head of the Naval Academy until his successor, Admiral Nikolai Maksimov, was appointed on 8 November that year.

== Honours and awards ==
Over his career Rimashevsky has received the Order of Military Merit in 1997, the Order "For Service to the Homeland in the Armed Forces of the USSR" third class in 1991, and various other medals. His work in academic circles led to his appointment as a full member of the Russian Academy of Natural Sciences in 1999, the Academy of Military Historical Sciences in 2000, the Academy of Military Sciences in 2005, and the International Academy of Informatization. He has also been a member of the editorial board of the naval journal Morskoy Sbornik. He has authored more than 150 scientific and pedagogical works, including 7 monographs, and has the titles of Honoured Military Specialist of Russia since 2002, and Honoured Worker of Science and Technology of Russia, and is a laureate of the Russian Government Prize in Science and Technology.
