= Soviet cruiser Zhdanov =

Soviet Sverdlov-class cruiser

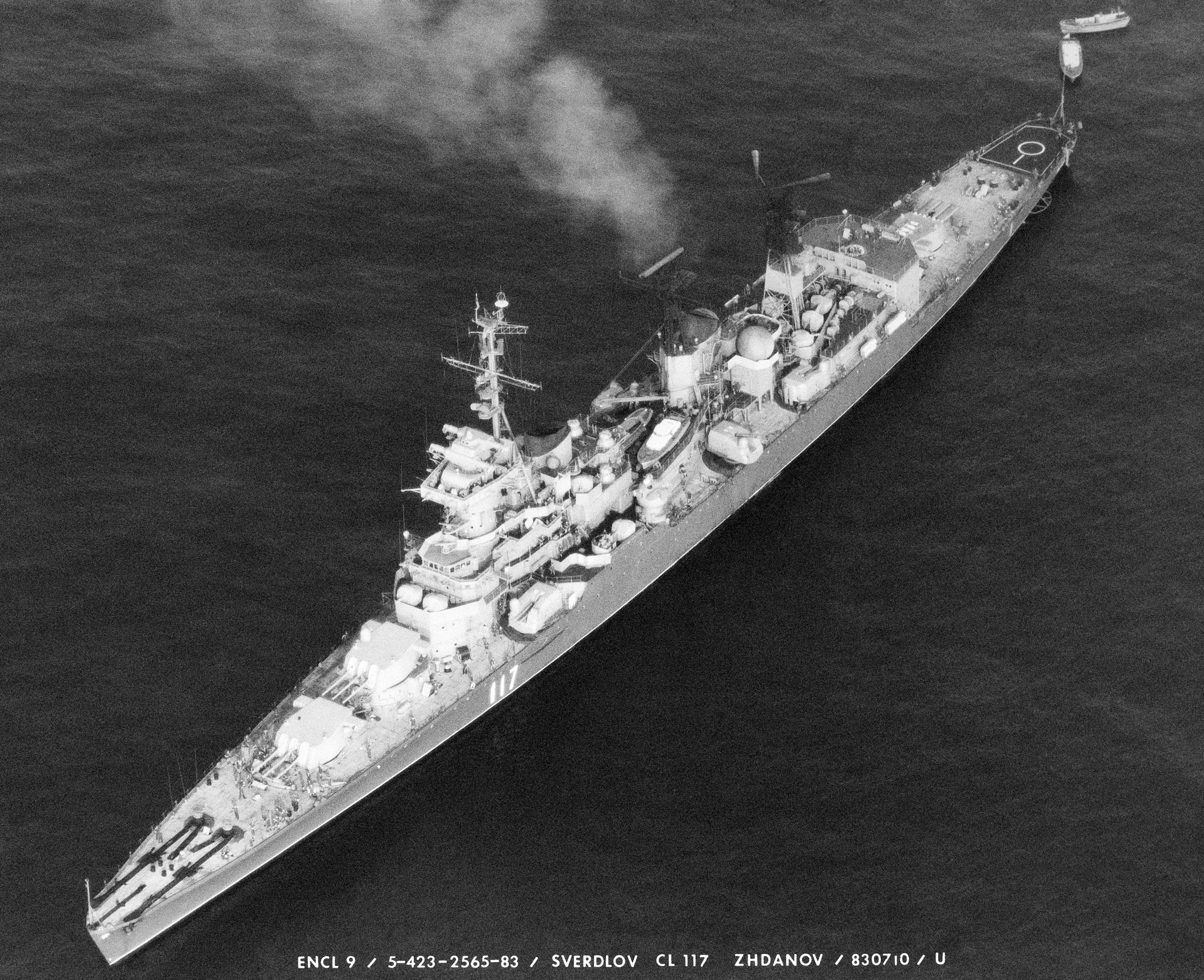
- Zhdanov underway in 1983

History

Soviet Union
- Name: Zhdanov; (Жданов)
- Namesake: Andrei Zhdanov
- Ordered: 3 December 1947
- Builder: Baltic Shipyard, Leningrad
- Yard number: 419
- Laid down: 11 February 1950
- Launched: 27 December 1950
- Commissioned: 31 December 1952
- Decommissioned: 10 December 1989
- Stricken: 19 April 1990
- Home port: Tallinn
- Identification: See Pennant numbers
- Fate: Scrapped, 1991

General characteristics
- Class & type: Sverdlov-class cruiser
- Displacement: 13,600 tonnes (13,385 long tons) standard; 16,640 tonnes (16,377 long tons) full load
- Length: 210 m (689 ft 0 in) overall; 205 m (672 ft 7 in) waterline
- Beam: 22 m (72 ft 2 in)
- Draught: 6.9 m (22 ft 8 in)
- Propulsion: 2 × shaft geared steam turbines; 6 × boilers, 110,000 hp (82,000 kW)
- Speed: 32.5 knots (60.2 km/h; 37.4 mph)
- Range: 9,000 nmi (17,000 km; 10,000 mi) at 18 knots (33 km/h; 21 mph)
- Complement: 1,250
- Armament: as designed: 4 × triple 15.2 cm (6.0 in)/57 cal B-38 guns in Mk5-bis turrets; 6 × twin 10 cm (3.9 in)/56 cal Model 1934 guns in SM-5-1 mounts; 16 × twin 3.7 cm (1.5 in) AA guns in V-11M mounts; 2 × quintuple 533 mm (21.0 in) torpedo tubes in PTA-53-68-bis mounts; command ship: 3 × triple 15.2 cm (6.0 in)/57 cal B-38 guns in Mk5-bis turrets; 6 × twin 10 cm (3.9 in)/56 cal Model 1934 guns in SM-5-1 mounts; 16 × twin 3.7 cm (1.5 in) AA guns in V-11M mounts; 2 × quintuple 533 mm (21.0 in) torpedo tubes in PTA-53-68-bis mounts
- Armour: Belt: 100 mm (3.9 in); Conning tower: 150 mm (5.9 in); Deck: 50 mm (2.0 in); Turrets: 175 mm (6.9 in) front, 65 mm (2.6 in) sides, 60 mm (2.4 in) rear, 75 mm (3.0 in) roof; Barbettes: 130 mm (5.1 in); Bulkheads: 100–120 mm (3.9–4.7 in)
- Aviation facilities: Helipad

Zhdanov was a Sverdlov-class cruiser of Soviet Navy.

== Development and design ==
The Sverdlov-class cruisers, Soviet designation Project 68bis, were the last conventional gun cruisers built for the Soviet Navy. They were built in the 1950s and were based on Soviet, German, and Italian designs and concepts developed prior to the Second World War. They were modified to improve their sea keeping capabilities, allowing them to run at high speed in the rough waters of the North Atlantic. The basic hull was more modern and had better armor protection than the vast majority of the post Second World War gun cruiser designs built and deployed by peer nations. They also carried an extensive suite of modern radar equipment and anti-aircraft artillery. The Soviets originally planned to build 40 ships in the class, which would be supported by the Stalingrad-class battlecruisers and aircraft carriers.

The Sverdlov class displaced 13,600 tons standard and 16,640 tons at full load. They were 210 metres (689 ft 0 in) long overall and 205 metres (672 ft 7 in) long at the waterline. They had a beam of 22 metres (72 ft 2 in) and draught of 6.9 metres (22 ft 8 in) and typically had a complement of 1,250. The hull was a completely welded new design and the ships had a double bottom for over 75% of their length. The ship also had twenty-three watertight bulkheads. The Sverdlovs had six boilers providing steam to two shaft geared steam turbines generating 118,100 shaft horsepower (88,100 kW). This gave the ships a maximum speed of 32.5 knots (60.2 km/h; 37.4 mph). The cruisers had a range of 9,000 nautical miles (17,000 km; 10,000 mi) at 18 knots (33 km/h; 21 mph).

Sverdlov-class cruisers main armament included twelve 152 mm (6 in)/57 cal B-38 guns mounted in four triple Mk5-bis turrets. They also had twelve 100 mm (3.9 in)/56 cal Model 1934 guns in six twin SM-5-1 mounts. For anti-aircraft weaponry, the cruisers had thirty-two 37 mm (1.5 in) anti-aircraft guns in sixteen twin mounts and were also equipped with ten 533 mm (21 in) torpedo tubes in two mountings of five each.

The Sverdlovs had 100 mm (3.9 in) belt armor and had a 50 mm (2.0 in) armored deck. The turrets were shielded by 175 mm (6.9 in) armor and the conning tower, by 150 mm (5.9 in) armor.

The cruisers' ultimate radar suite included one 'Big Net' or 'Top Trough' air search radar, one 'High Sieve' or 'Low Sieve' air search radar, one 'Knife Rest' air search radar and one 'Slim Net' air search radar. For navigational radar they had one 'Don-2' or 'Neptune' model. For fire control purposes the ships were equipped with two 'Sun Visor' radars, two 'Top Bow' 152 mm gun radars and eight 'Egg Cup' gun radars. For electronic countermeasures the ships were equipped with two 'Watch Dog' ECM systems.

== Construction and career ==
Zhdanov was laid down on 11 February 1950 at Baltic Shipyard, Leningrad and launched on 27 December 1950. The vessel was commissioned on 31 December 1952. On 25 January 1953, the Soviet naval flag was raised aboard the ship when the cruiser became part of the 8th task force of the KBF. Her homeport was Tallinn. On 25 January 1954, on the occasion of the first anniversary of the raising of the naval flag, the commander-in-chief of the Soviet Navy, Admiral of the Fleet N.G. Kuznetsov, was present on the cruiser. On 24 December 1955, the cruiser was added to the Baltic Fleet.

In September 1988, Zhdanov took part in the exercises of the Black Sea Fleet "Autumn-88". The cruiser was command by Captain 1st Rank Adam Rimashevsky. On 21 February 1989, the name Zhdanov was removed. A new one was not assigned, and the vessel was listed as KRU 101. On 10 December 1989, by order of the Commander-in-Chief of the Soviet Navy, the vessel was re-registered as the command cruiser Zhdanov.

On 19 April 1990, the Soviet Navy flag was lowered and disarmament of the cruiser began for transfer to the Stock Property Department for dismantling and sale. In February 1991, the crew of the cruiser was disbanded. The cruiser was sold to a private foreign company for scrap. On 27 November 1991, Zhdanov, with the tug Shakhtar, departed for the port of Alang, India, to be broken up.

=== Pennant numbers ===
Date	Pennant number
1953	19
1954	16
1955	10
1956	20
1957	62
1959	320
1962	258
1964	128
1970	855
1971	854
1972	857
1972	801
1973	856
1974	835
1974	855
1974	857
1975	842
1976	845
1976	849
1978	854
1980	118
1982	121
1983	117
1984	111
1984	132
1985	116
1988	101

== Gallery ==
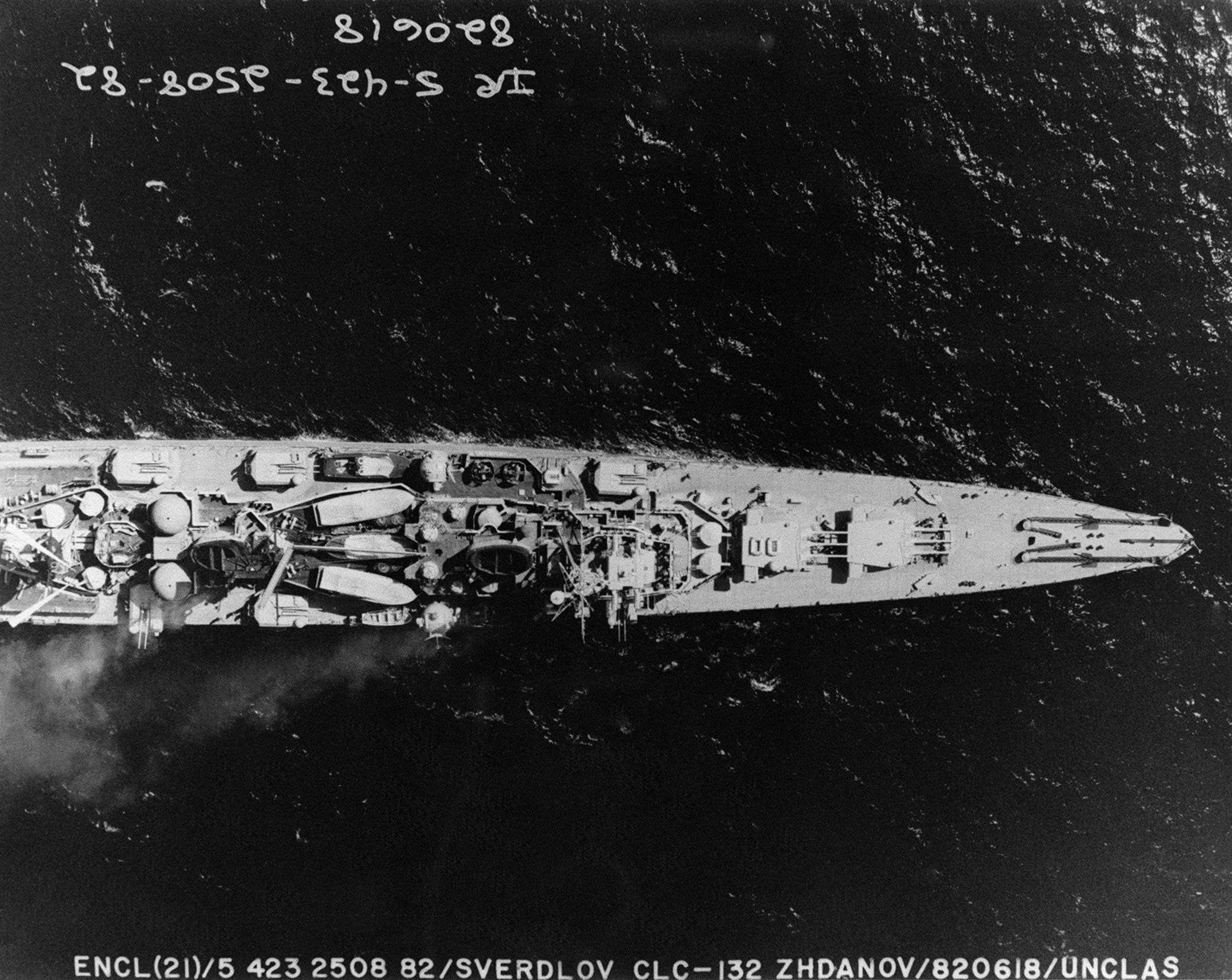
Zhdanov on 18 June 1982

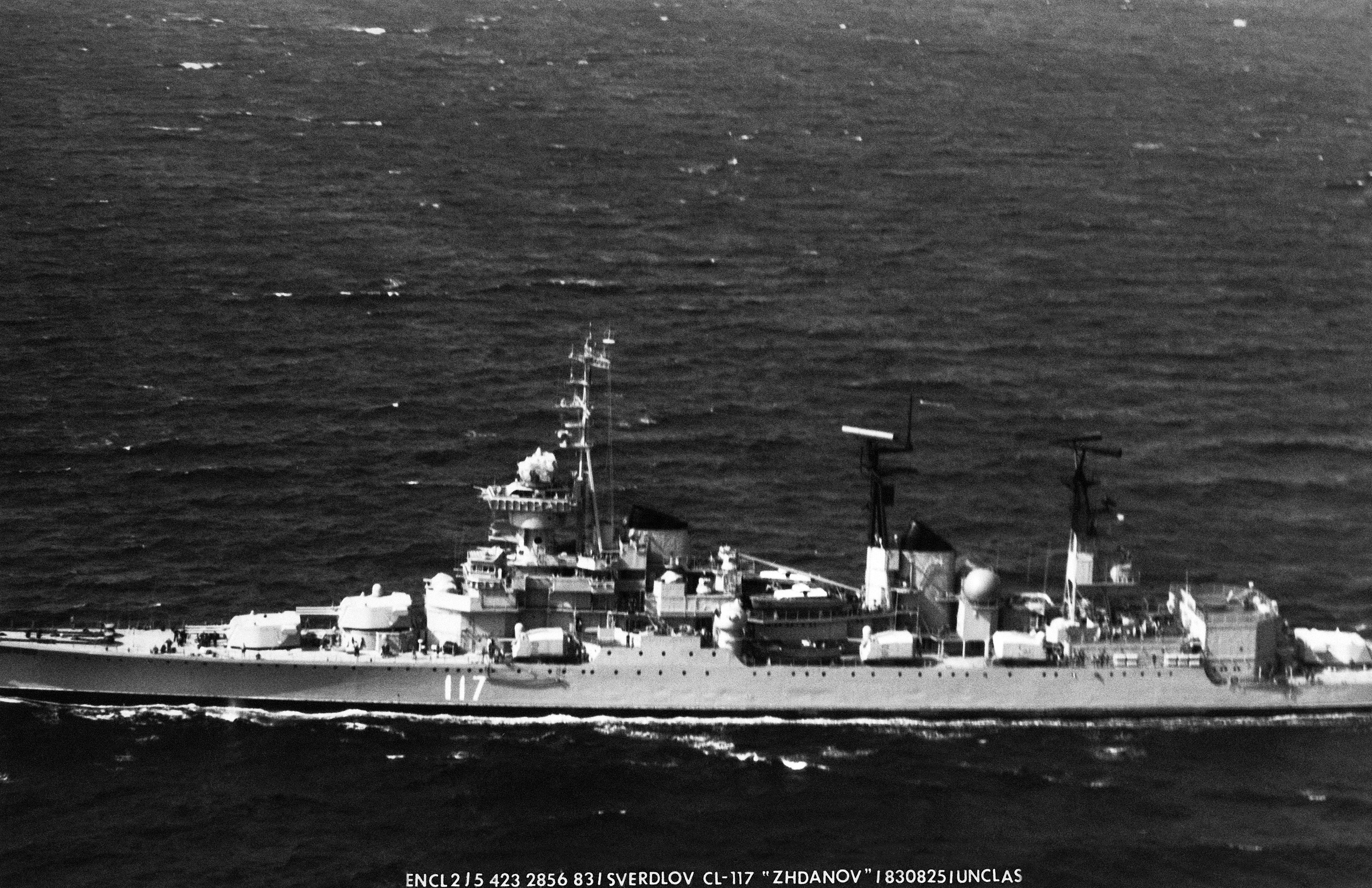
Zhdanov underway on 10 July 1983

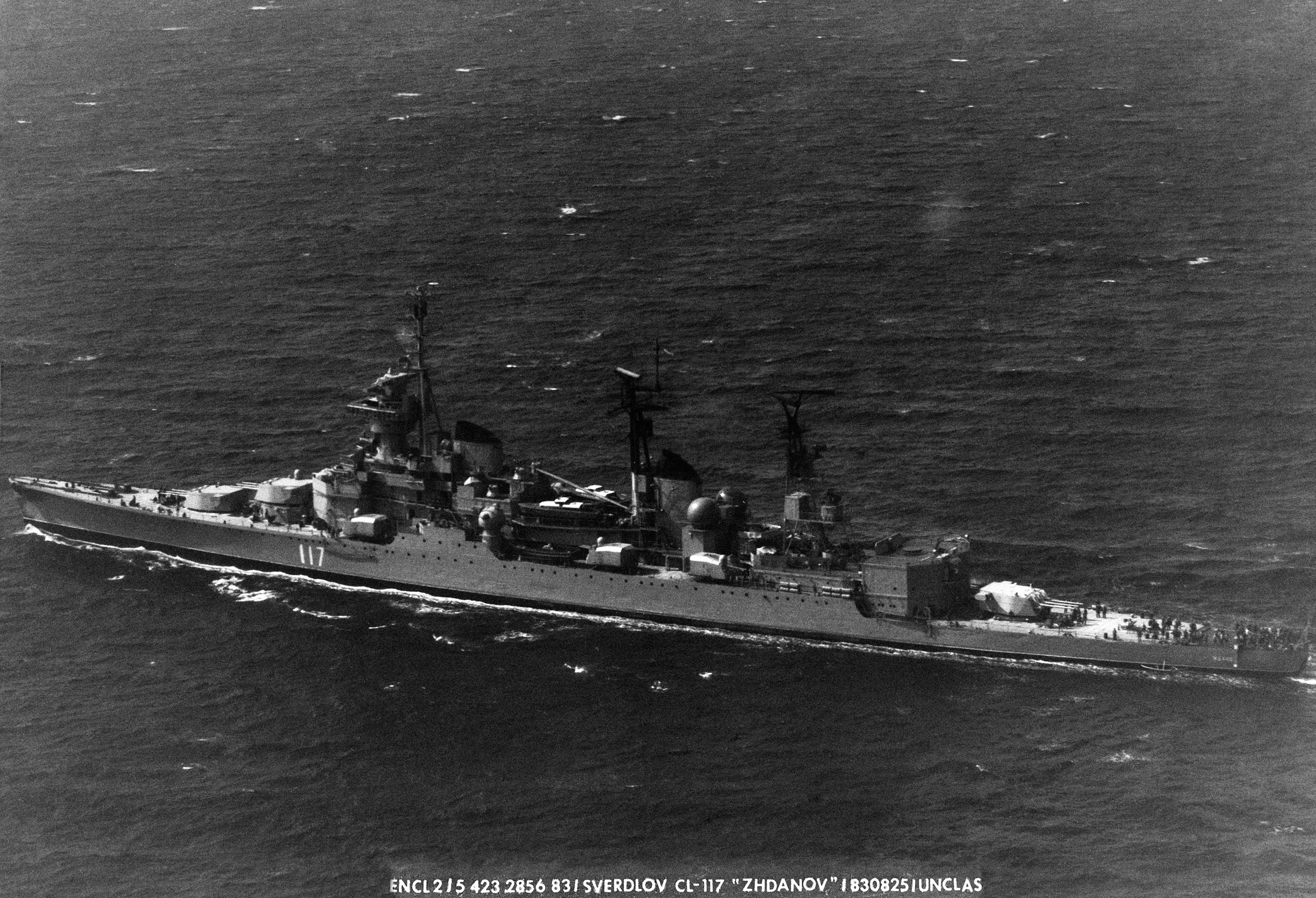
Zhdanov underway on 10 July 1983

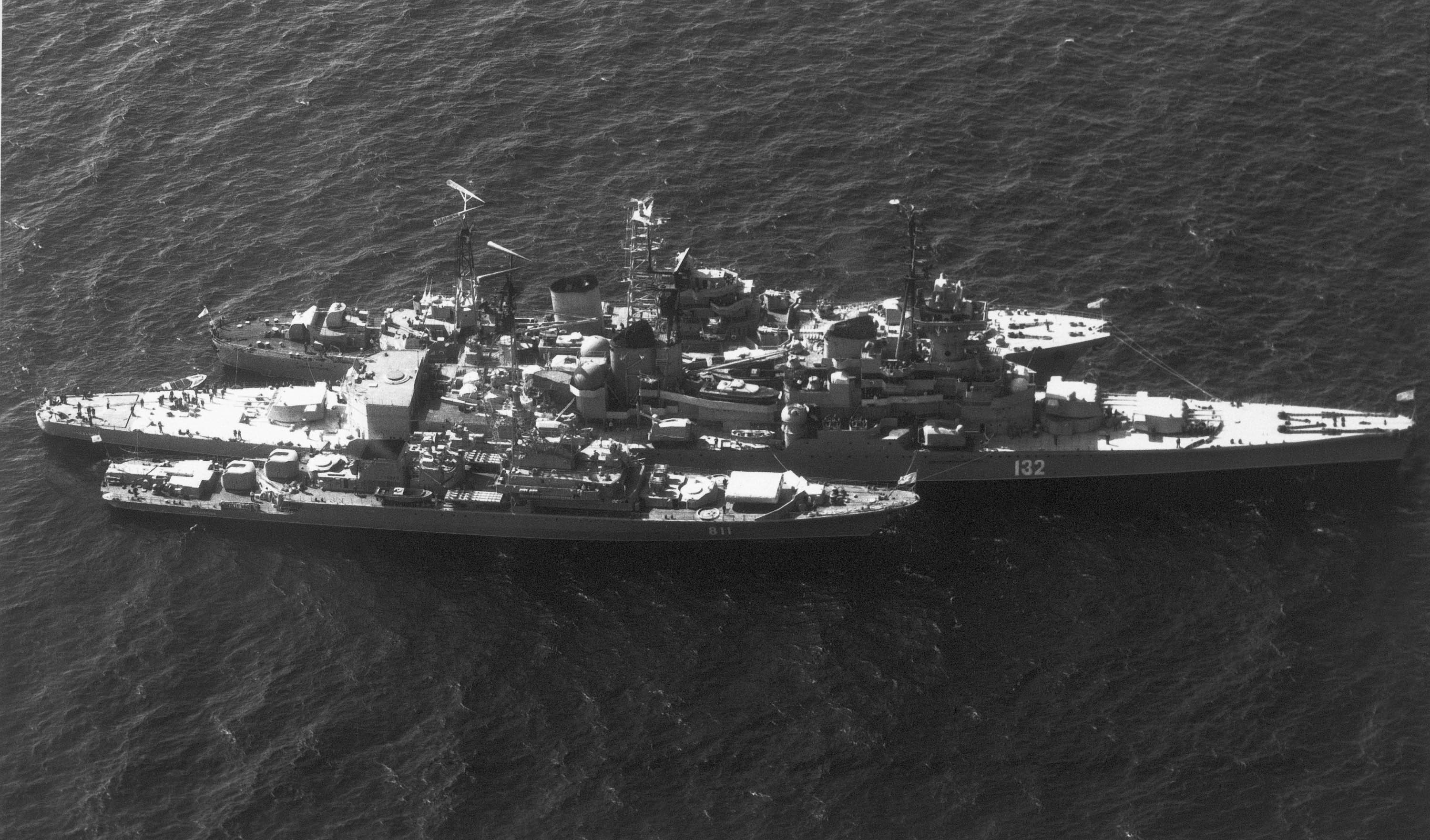
Zhdanov alongside Bezzavetnyy and Magomed Gadzhiev on 30 October 1985.
