= KRI Sorong =

Indonesian Navy tanker

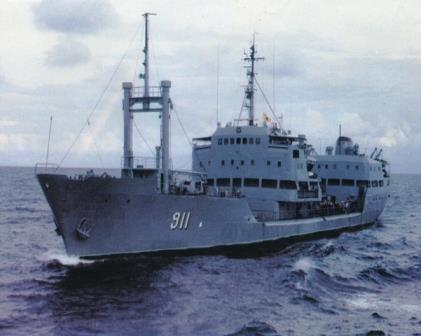
- KRI Sorong underway, date unknown.

History

Indonesia
- Name: Sorong
- Namesake: Sorong, Indonesia
- Builder: Trogir Shipyard, Yugoslavia
- Launched: 1964
- Commissioned: 1965
- Decommissioned: 27 October 2021
- Identification: Pennant number: 911; IMO number: 6418649
- Status: Decommissioned

General characteristics
- Type: Tanker
- Displacement: 4.090 t (4.025 long tons), standard load; 5.100 t (5.019 long tons), full load
- Length: 112.17 m (368.0 ft) LOA
- Beam: 15.4 m (51 ft)
- Draught: 6.6 m (22 ft)
- Propulsion: 1 × Deutz diesel; 1 × shaft
- Speed: 15 kn (28 km/h; 17 mph)
- Complement: 110 crews
- Sensors & processing systems: 1 × radar
- Armament: 2 × pintles for machine guns
- Aircraft carried: flight deck

KRI Sorong (911) was the only ship of her type, built in Yugoslavia. She was an oiler of the Indonesian Navy.

== Development ==
KRI Sorong's main purpose was to provide support during amphibious operations and serve as a tanker. Her midship jackstay rig help to transfer materials during UNREP. She was capable of holding 3000 tons of fuel and 300 tons of drinking water. Sorong was unarmed most of the time but she has 2 machine guns pintles for self defense.

== Construction and career ==
She was launched in 1964 by Trogir shipyards. Commissioned in 1965 with the hull number 911 or sometimes also referred to as AO-911.

Sorong made history because she was part of the Combat Team for an amphibious landing operation to seize the city of Dili in East Timor on 6 December 1975, part of the Indonesian invasion of East Timor from 1975 to 1976.

She was decommissioned on 27 October 2021.
