= USS Askari =

1945 Achelous-class repair ship

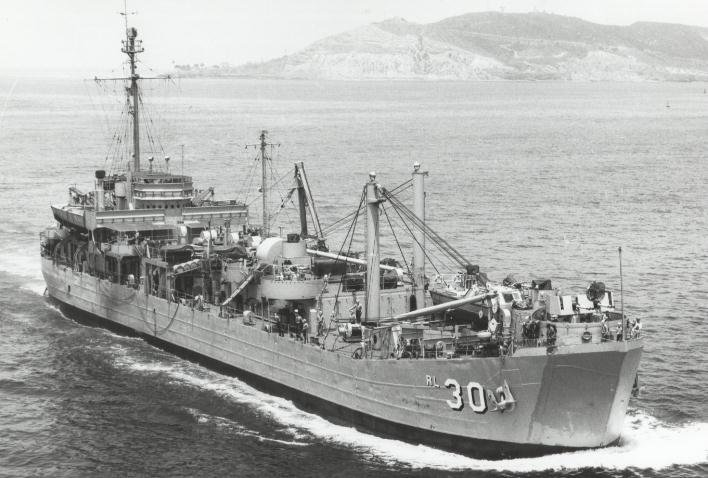
- USS Askari underway off Point Loma, San Diego

History

United States
- Name: LST-1131
- Builder: Chicago Bridge & Iron Company
- Laid down: 8 December 1944
- Launched: 2 March 1945
- Commissioned: 15 March 1945
- Decommissioned: 9 April 1945
- Renamed: USS Askari (ARL-30)
- Refit: Renamed and reoutfitted by Merrill-Stevens Drydock & Repair Co.
- Recommissioned: 23 July 1945
- Decommissioned: 1 September 1971
- Fate: Sold to Indonesian Navy, 1971
- Stricken: 1 February 1979

Indonesia
- Name: KRI Jayawijaya (921)
- Namesake: Jayawijaya Mountains
- Acquired: 1971
- Status: in active service

General characteristics
- Class & type: Achelous-class repair ship
- Displacement: 2,220 long tons (2,256 t) light; 3,960 long tons (4,024 t) full
- Length: 328 ft (100 m)
- Beam: 50 ft (15 m)
- Draft: 11 ft 2 in (3.40 m)
- Propulsion: 2 × General Motors 12-567 diesel engines
- Speed: 12 knots (14 mph; 22 km/h)
- Complement: 254 sailors
- Armament: 2 × quad 40mm AA gun mounts w/Mk-51 directors; 2 × twin 40mm AA gun mounts w/Mk-51 directors; 6 × twin 20mm AA gun mounts

Service record
- Operations: Korean War; Vietnam War
- Awards: 4 battle stars (Korea); 12 battle stars (Vietnam); 2 Presidential Unit Citations (Vietnam)

USS Askari (ARL-30) was one of 39 Achelous-class landing craft repair ships built for the United States Navy during World War II. Askari is an Arabic word for soldier, a term frequently applied to indigenous troops in Africa serving European colonial powers, particularly the British and Germans in East Africa from the late 19th century to the end of World War I; ARL-30 has been the only U.S. naval vessel to bear the name.

Originally laid down as USS LST-1131 on 8 December 1944 at Seneca, Illinois by the Chicago Bridge & Iron Company, she was launched on 2 March 1945 and sponsored by Mrs. Patricia Ann Jacobsen. Askari was then ferried down the Mississippi River to New Orleans, where the landing craft repair ship was commissioned on 15 March 1945. On 28 March, she got underway for Jacksonville, Florida where she was decommissioned on 9 April 1945 for outfitting for her role by the Merrill-Stevens Drydock & Repair Company. The ship was recommissioned as USS Askari (ARL-30) on 23 July 1945.

In 1971, she was transferred to the Indonesian Navy and recommissioned as KRI Djaja Widjaja.

== Service history ==
Early in August, the ship voyaged from Jacksonville to Norfolk, Virginia, where she remained until putting to sea on 20 August, bound for the Pacific Ocean. After transiting the Panama Canal and steaming north along the Pacific coast, she reached San Diego on 21 September. At the beginning of October, Askari shifted north to Seattle and remained in the Puget Sound area until the spring of 1946. Early in April 1946, the ship headed south and arrived back at San Diego on 10 April. She operated in that vicinity until sailing for the Marshall Islands on 12 December 1947.

Steaming by way of Hawaii, the repair ship arrived at Eniwetok in the Marshalls on 11 January 1948 and spent the next four months providing maintenance services to the landing craft operating in support of "Operation Sandstone", nuclear bomb tests conducted there late in April and early in May. After the experiments ended, Askari left Eniwetok on 29 May and headed back, via Pearl Harbor, to San Diego. She reached that port on 25 June and resumed local operations. Her service at San Diego continued through the outbreak of fighting in Korea late in June 1950.

=== Korean War ===
The vessel sailed for the Far East on 10 August 1950, and arrived in Kobe, Japan on 6 September. Four days later, she was underway to participate in the amphibious landing to be carried out on 15 September at Inchon on South Korea's western coast. Askari served at Inchon for slightly over a month, before moving to Wonsan on the eastern coast of North Korea late in October.

Chinese communist forces entered the conflict toward the end of November and sent the United Nations forces reeling southward. A portion of those troops converged on Hungnam, located due north of Wonsan about 40 miles distant, for evacuation. Askari shifted north from Wonsan to Hungnam to support the ships and craft engaged in bringing out the troops. During December, she fueled, repaired, and provided other services to the amphibious craft and ships transporting the troops. The evacuation ships embarked the last infantrymen about mid-afternoon on Christmas Eve, and Askari departed Hungnam with them.

Steaming via Pusan, she arrived in Yokosuka, Japan, on the last day of 1950. She remained in Japan until departing Yokosuka on 9 February 1951 to return to Pusan. There, the ship tended amphibious ships and craft until mid-April, when she headed home.

She spent 10 days in Yokosuka before resuming her voyage to the United States. Askari arrived in San Diego on 26 May and remained there until she moved to the Mare Island Naval Shipyard during the second week in July for overhaul. She completed repairs in mid-September 1951 and returned to amphibious repair duties at San Diego on 20 September. On 31 July 1952, she stood out to sea and proceeded to the western Pacific. Except for a brief visit to Kobe late in February 1953, Askari spent the entire deployment at Yokosuka performing repair work in support of the amphibious ships and craft attached to the 7th Fleet.

The ship departed Yokosuka on 6 April 1953 to return to the United States and reentered San Diego Bay on 3 May. After an overhaul at Mare Island that occupied most of the summer of 1953, Askari again took up repair duties at San Diego at the beginning of the second week in September. Just over a year later, on 20 September 1954, she headed back toward the Far East.

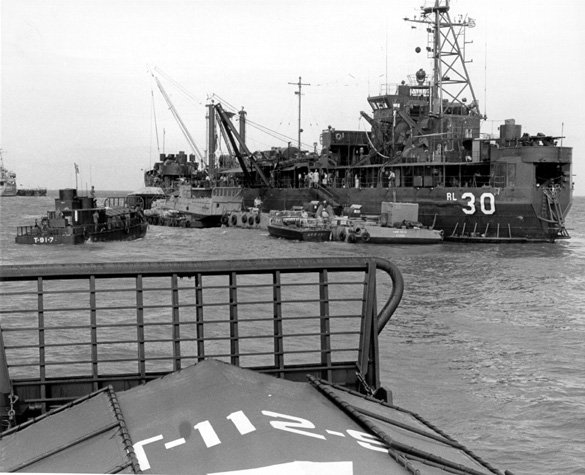
USS Askari (ARL-30) at anchor in Vietnam, date unknown. The ship is painted green, reflecting her assignment to the "Brown Water Navy."

=== Southeast Asia ===
This time, however, she charted a course for a new trouble spot: the coast of southeast Asia. France's withdrawal from Indochina fragmented the peninsula into Laos; Cambodia; and two Vietnams: a communist state in the north, and a non-communist, authoritarian one in the south. The new political arrangement prompted a massive migration of people in which the United States Navy was called upon to carry out the seaborne portion of the movement. Askari arrived at Henriette Passe in Along Bay near Haiphong in the north on 29 October and began providing repair and other support services for the transports, tank landing ships, and landing craft that would carry refugees from what would be communist North Vietnam to democratic South Vietnam in "Operation Passage to Freedom." The ship ended her service on the Vietnamese coast on 18 November and promptly got underway, via Hong Kong, for Japan.

She arrived at Yokosuka on 4 December 1954, and four days later, moved to Sasebo to conduct repair operations until 1 February 1955. Askari departed Sasebo on the latter date to provide support services for the ships engaged in another humanitarian effort, the evacuation of Nationalist Chinese from the Tachen Islands. She returned from that mission to Sasebo on 14 February and operated there for the remainder of the deployment.

=== Decommissioning ===
On 5 March 1955, she stood out of Sasebo on her way back to the United States. The ship reached San Diego again on 4 April and worked at that port for about six months. Late in October, 1955 she moved north to Astoria, Oregon and began preparations for inactivation. Askari was decommissioned there on 21 March 1956 and was berthed with the Columbia River Group, Pacific Reserve Fleet.

Askari remained in reserve for slightly more than a decade. During her repose, she was berthed first at Astoria; later moved to Stockton, California and ended up at Mare Island.

=== Vietnam ===
In 1964, the United States began to intensify its involvement in the war between the South Vietnamese government and Viet Cong insurgents. Operations in the swampy Mekong Delta called for the use of a large number of river assault craft and their attendant support ships. Accordingly, Askari was taken to the Willamette Iron & Steel Co. at Richmond, California late in November 1965 to prepare for service in South Vietnam. She was recommissioned at the Mare Island Naval Shipyard on 13 August 1966. The ship spent the next four months fitting out, conducting shakedown training, and preparing to deploy to the Far East.

She stood out of San Diego on 12 December 1966 bound for the western Pacific. However, an engineering casualty to her main propulsion plant caused her to remain in Pearl Harbor longer than anticipated. She finally pulled into Subic Bay in the Philippines on 6 February 1967. There, Askari loaded provisions, stores, and spare parts for five days before heading on to her permanent assignment in South Vietnam.

She steamed into Vũng Tàu harbor on 15 February and reported for duty with River Assault Flotilla (RivFlot) 1. Askari spent the remainder of her navy career providing repair and other support services for the river monitors, motorboats, and amphibious craft attached to Allied riverine forces in the Mekong Delta. She stayed at Vung Tau until the second week in June, when she moved into the delta proper. The repair ship arrived at Nhà Bè on the Soài Rạp river about 5 miles (8.0 km) south of Saigon on 13 June. The mobility of the riverine forces was greatly enhanced by the fact that their base consisted of ships like Askari that could move with them throughout the delta and be close at hand to provide support services. A permanent base ashore would not have afforded such immediacy.

During 1967 and most of 1968, Askari moved from location to location in the delta as the Mobile Riverine Force's zone of operations changed. On 1 November 1968 the USS Westchester County, one of the ships that comprised the riverine force's mobile base, suffered severe damage and lost a number of crewmen as a result of the explosion of two mines attached to her hull by enemy swimmer-sappers. While continuing with her responsibilities to the rest of the riverine force, Askan put forth most of the effort required to salvage and to repair the tank landing ship.

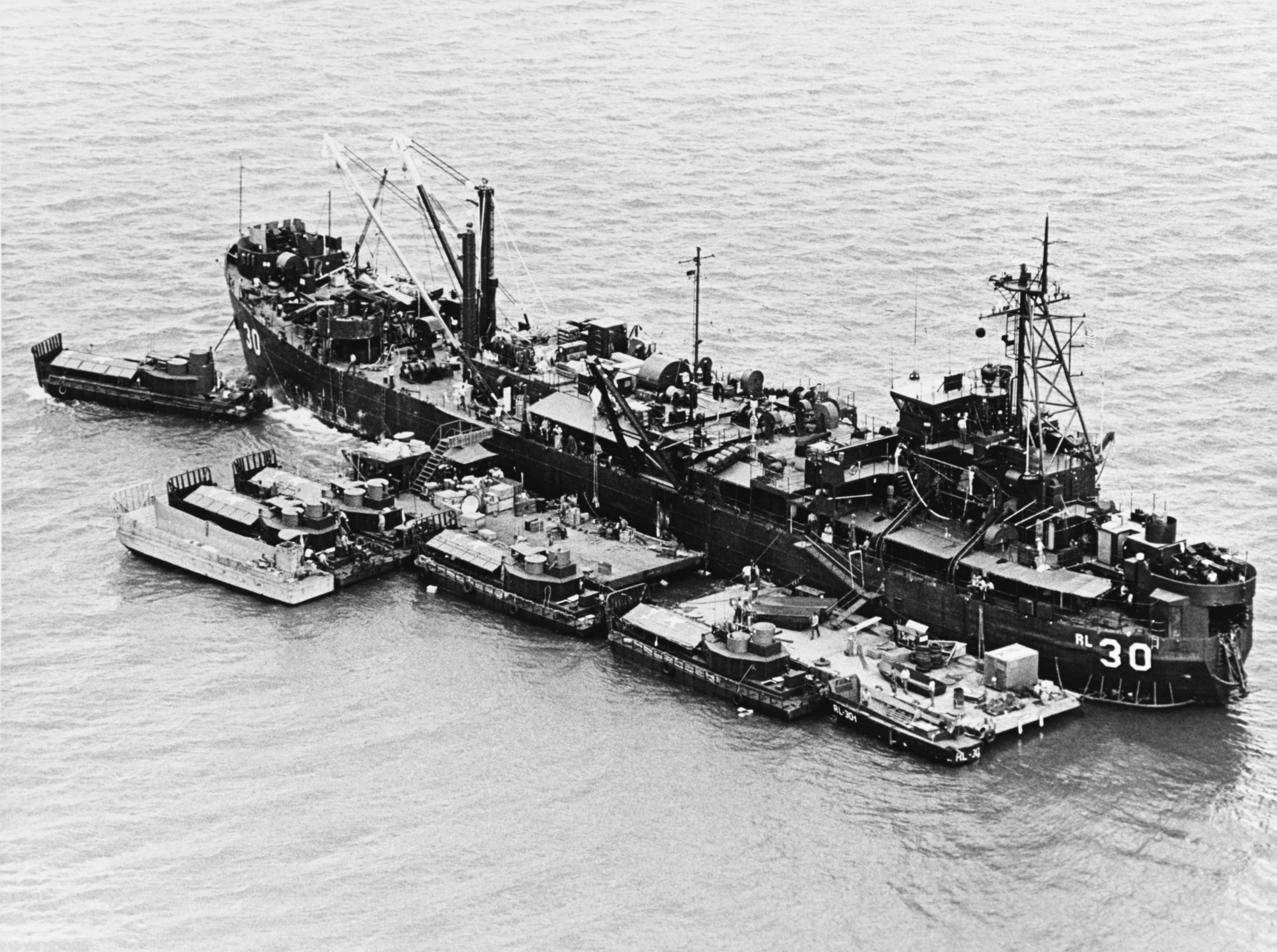
USS Askari (ARL-30), one of the mobile bases of the River Assault Flotilla, May 1967, servicing four armored troop carriers (ATCs) while a fifth ATC clears her side, forward. Also moored to the pontoons alongside the repair ship is one of her LCVPs. Note the booms, forward, and the A-frame amidships.

At the end of 1968, the Mobile Riverine Force began to focus its attention on the insurgents' logistic routes coming into the delta from Cambodia. During the second week in December, Askari moved to the vicinity of the Song Vam Co, Song Vam Co Dong, and Song Vam Co Tay Rivers to support friendly vessels in their prosecution of Operation Giant Slingshot. Her labors in behalf of the interdiction effort continued through the first eight months of 1969.

At the beginning of September, the ship departed Vietnamese waters to undergo repairs at Sasebo, Japan. When she returned to Vietnam at the end of October 1969, Askari resumed repair duties, this time at Châu Đốc, south of her previous base of operations. She remained there until 9 November, when the base ships relocated to Long Xuyên, their station for the remainder of 1969 and most of the first quarter of 1970. Late in March 1970, she and the other support ships moved to Đồng Tâm Base Camp and provided repair services at that point until early May. On 9 May she returned to the upper reaches of the Mekong near the Cambodian border to resume support for efforts to stop the flow of Viet Cong supplies. Early in June, the ship arrived back at Đồng Tâm to serve as the primary support ship for RivRon 13 and RivRon 15 until those squadrons turned over their responsibilities to Army of the Republic of Vietnam forces later that month. Between 25 June and 31 August, she operated successively in the upper Mekong, at Bình Thủy on the lower Mekong, and then back at Đồng Tâm again. Except for a round-trip mission to deliver boat engines to Song Bo De between 31 August and 8 September, Askari performed her support functions at Đồng Tâm until the middle of December. Thereafter, the ship continued to serve at various locations in the Mekong delta for nine more months. In mid-August 1971, she proceeded from Vietnam to the Marianas on her last voyage for the United States Navy.

== Transfer to the Indonesian Navy ==
On 1 September 1971, Askari was decommissioned at Guam and turned over to the Indonesian government under the terms of the Military Assistance Program. The Indonesian Navy recommissioned her that same day as KRI Djaja Widjaja. Because of her status as a loan, Askari remained on the Naval Vessel Register until February, 1979. At that time, her name was struck and she was permanently transferred to the Indonesian Navy by sale.

== Awards ==
Askari earned four battle stars during the Korean War and received 12 battle stars and two Presidential Unit Citations for service during the Vietnam War.
