= Zulu-class submarine =

Soviet diesel-electric submarine class

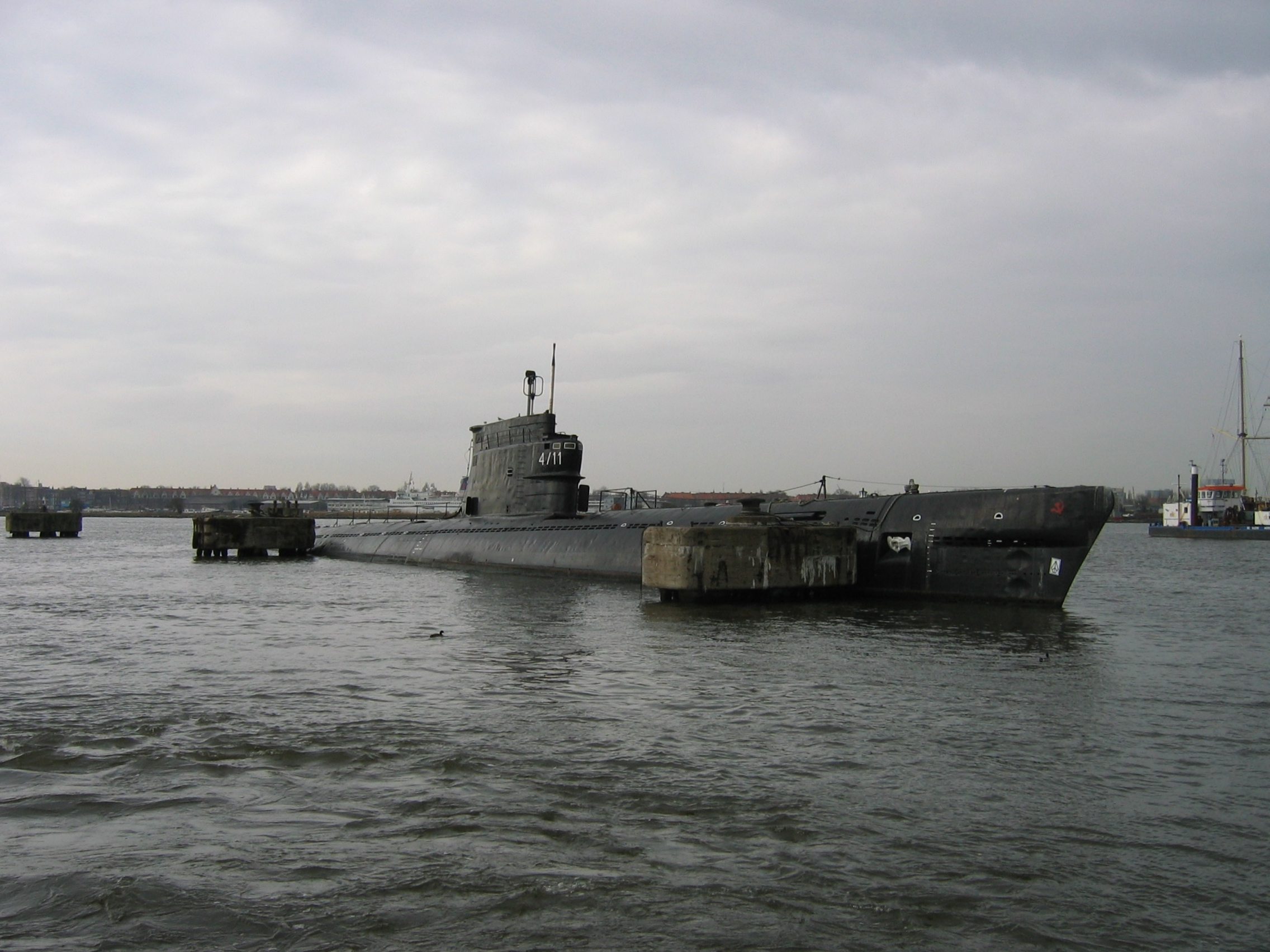
- Project 611 submarine in Amsterdam

Class overview
- Name: 611
- Operators: Soviet Navy
- Preceded by: Kreiserskaya class
- Succeeded by: 641; 629
- In commission: 1952
- Planned: 26
- Completed: 26
- Retired: 26

General characteristics
- Type: Attack submarine
- Displacement: 1875 tons (1905 metric tonnes) surfaced; 2387 tons (2425 metric tonnes) submerged
- Length: 90 m (295 ft)
- Beam: 7.5 m
- Draught: 5.14 m
- Propulsion: 3 diesel engines (6000 hp); 3 electric motors (5400 hp)
- Speed: Surfaced: 18 knots (33 km/h); Submerged: 16 knots (30 km/h)
- Test depth: 200 m (656 ft)
- Complement: 70 officers and men
- Armament: 6 bow and 4 stern 533-mm (21-inch) torpedo tubes; 22 torpedoes; 6 of the submarines were equipped with R-11FM Scud missiles

The Soviet Navy's Project 611 (NATO reporting name: Zulu) were one of the first Soviet post-Second-World-War attack submarines. They were similarly capable to the American GUPPY fleet-boat conversions. They were a contemporary of the Whiskey-class submarines and shared a similar sonar arrangement. Like most conventional submarines designed 1946–1960, their design was influenced by the German World War II Type XXI submarine.

== Design ==

The first few boats of the class were equipped with twin 57 mm and twin 25 mm anti-aircraft guns and no snorkels, although the guns were removed and snorkels added soon after the boats entered service. Six were converted in 1956 to become the world's first ballistic missile submarines, one armed with a single R-11FM Scud missile and five others with two Scuds each. They were designated as Project AV 611 and received the NATO reporting name of Zulu V. The missiles were too long to be contained in the boat's hull, and extended into the enlarged sail. To be fired, the submarine had to surface and raise the missile out of the sail. Soviet submarine B-67 successfully launched a missile on 16 September 1955.

The Zulus were the basis for the very successful Foxtrot-class submarines, which lent their hull to the Golf class of ballistic missile submarine.

== Boats ==
Twenty-six boats were built overall, entering service from 1952 to 1957, 8 of them in Leningrad and 18 in Severodvinsk. Their names were initially B-61 through B-82 and B-88 through B-91, with most renamed in the 1970s or 1980s. The class received the NATO reporting names Zulu I through Zulu V, the last referring to the five converted missile-firing submarines (excluding the prototype). It is unclear from references how many of each subclass were built. Most were repurposed for non-combat purposes before being destroyed.

== See also ==
Equivalent submarines of the same era

- Tang class
- Porpoise class
- Narval class

== Notes ==
=== Bibliography ===
- Friedman, Norman (1995). "Soviet Union 1947–1991: Russian Federation and Successor States 1991–". In Chumbley, Stephen (ed.). Conway's All the World's Fighting Ships 1947–1995. Naval Institute Press. pp. 337–426. ISBN 1-55750-132-7.
- Pavlov, A. S. (1997). Warships of the USSR and Russia 1945–1995. Naval Institute Press. ISBN 1-55750-671-X.
- Polmar, Norman & Moore, Kenneth J. (2004). Cold War Submarines: The Design and Construction of U.S. and Soviet Submarines. Potomac Books. ISBN 978-1-57488-594-1.
- Polmar, Norman & Noot, Jurrien (1991). Submarines of the Russian and Soviet Navies, 1718–1990. Naval Institute Press. ISBN 0-87021-570-1.
- Polmar, Norman (2026). Submarines of the Russian and Soviet Navies: 1946–2026. Schiffer Publishing. ISBN 978-0-7643-7083-0.
