= Mikhail Khronopulo =

Soviet admiral

Mikhail Nikolayevich Khronopulo
- Born: 3 May 1933; Dvukhglinki, Lukhovitsky District, Moscow Oblast, Soviet Union
- Died: 10 April 2012 (aged 78) Moscow, Russia
- Allegiance: Soviet Union
- Branch: Soviet Navy
- Service years: 1956–1992
- Rank: Admiral
- Commands: Soviet destroyer Neuderzhimy; Soviet destroyer Strogy; 173rd Anti-Submarine Warfare Brigade; 8th Operational Squadron; Black Sea Fleet
- Awards: Order of the October Revolution; Order of the Red Banner; Order of the Red Star; Order "For Service to the Homeland in the Armed Forces of the USSR" 2nd and 3rd class

Mikhail Nikolayevich Khronopulo (Russian: Михаил Николаевич Хронопуло; 3 May 1933 – 10 April 2012) was a Soviet Navy admiral, the penultimate commander of the Soviet Black Sea Fleet.

Khronopulo began his naval career serving aboard ships of the Pacific Fleet, and commanded two destroyers, an anti-submarine brigade, and the fleet's 8th Operational Squadron. He commanded the Black Sea Fleet between 1985 and 1991, directing the effort to push United States Navy ships out of Soviet waters in the Black Sea bumping incident, and was replaced in late 1991 after being accused of supporting the 1991 Soviet coup d'état attempt.

== Early life and Cold War ==
Khronopulo was born on 3 May 1933 in the village of Dvukhglinki, Lukhovitsky District, Moscow Oblast to a family of Greek descent. He was recruited to the Soviet Navy through a Komsomol direction. After graduating from the Pacific Higher Naval School in 1956, he served on ships of the Pacific Fleet, beginning his service as a main gun turret commander on the light cruiser Kalinin. Khronopulo went on to lead the command group and the main gun division of the cruiser. Between 1964 and 1968 he served as senior assistant to the commander of the destroyer Neuderzhimy and then as its commander. For the next two years, Khronopulo commanded the destroyer Strogy before spending two years studying at the Naval Academy. Upon his graduation in 1972, he was appointed commander of the 173rd Destroyer Brigade (later the 173rd Anti-Submarine Warfare Brigade) in the Kamchatka Flotilla.

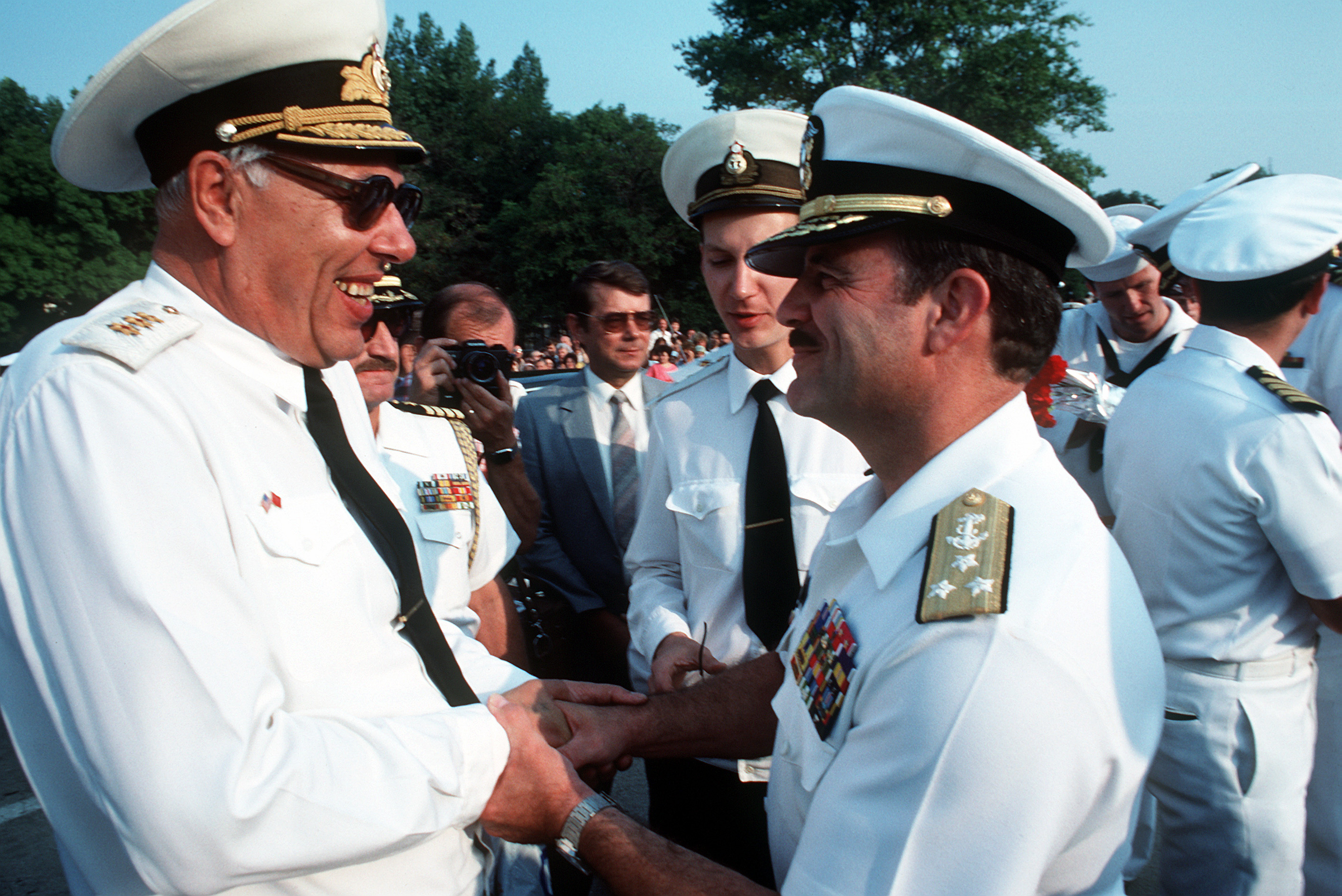
Ilg and Khronopulo shaking hands, 4 August 1989

Khronopulo became chief of staff of the 8th Operational Squadron of the fleet in the Indian Ocean in 1977, and in 1979 was promoted to kontr-admiral and appointed squadron commander. He was made First Deputy Commander of the Black Sea Fleet and head of the Sevastopol garrison in 1982 with the rank of vitse-admiral, and became its commander on 26 July 1985. He was promoted to admiral in 1986, and in September of that year led the operation to rescue survivors of the passenger ship Admiral Nakhimov. He supervised the attempt to push the American cruiser Yorktown and destroyer Caron out of Soviet territorial waters on 12 February 1988, which became known as the Black Sea bumping incident. In August 1989 he welcomed Deputy Commander in Chief, United States Naval Forces Europe Vice Admiral Paul Ilg to Sevastopol when cruiser Thomas S. Gates and frigate Kauffman visited the naval base in the first United States Navy visit to the Soviet Union since 1975. Khronopulo held the position until he was relieved of it in October 1991 after being accused of supporting the 1991 Soviet coup d'état attempt. He was forced to retire on 17 March 1992.

== Later and personal life ==
Between 1999 and 2002 he served as representative of the Autonomous Republic of Crimea in Moscow. Khronopulo died on 10 April 2012 after a long illness. His memoirs, My Life is the Sea (Russian: Жизнь моя-море…) were posthumously published.

Khronopulo married Flora Nikolayevna and had a son, Sergei, born in 1959.

== Awards ==
Khronopulo received the following awards and decorations:

- Order of the October Revolution
- Order of the Red Banner
- Order of the Red Star
- Order "For Service to the Homeland in the Armed Forces of the USSR" 2nd and 3rd class
