= Voin =

Voin may refer to:

== People ==
- Enravota, the first Bulgarian Christian martyr
- Voin, alternative Russian-language name of Vainius (fl. 1315–1338/1342), Prince of Polotsk
- Voin Rimsky-Korsakov (1822–1871), Russian navigator and geographer

== Ships ==
- Voin, initial name of the Finnish minelayer Louhi
- Voin-class of Imperial Russian sail frigates
- Voin, original name of HMS Tartar (1854)

== Other ==
- Voin (organization), Russian paramilitary training organization
- Voin (rural locality), a rural locality (a selo) in Namsky District of the Sakha Republic, Russia

== See also ==
- Voyn
