= Soviet destroyer Otvazhny =

Otvazhny is the name of the following ships of the Soviet Navy:

- Soviet destroyer Otvazhny (1948), a Ognevoy-class destroyer in service until 1966
- Soviet destroyer Otvazhny (1964), a Kashin-class destroyer, sunk due to an ammunition accident in 1974
