= Soviet destroyer Bedovy =

Kildin-class destroyer

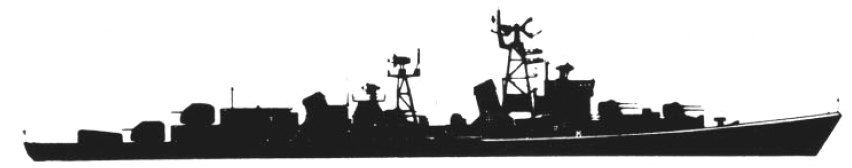
- Profile drawing of Kildin-class destroyer

History

Soviet Union
- Name: Bedovy; (Бедовый)
- Namesake: Mischievous in Russian
- Ordered: 30 September 1952
- Builder: Zhdanov Shipyard
- Laid down: 1 December 1953
- Launched: 31 July 1955
- Commissioned: 30 June 1958
- Decommissioned: 25 April 1989
- Fate: Scrapped, 1989

General characteristics
- Class & type: Kildin-class destroyer
- Displacement: 2,662 long tons (2,705 t) standard; 3,230 long tons (3,282 t) full load
- Length: 126.1 m (414 ft)
- Beam: 12.7 m (42 ft)
- Draught: 4.2 m (14 ft)
- Installed power: 72,000 hp (54,000 kW)
- Propulsion: 2 × shaft geared steam turbines; 4 × boilers
- Speed: 38 kn (70 km/h; 44 mph)
- Complement: 273
- Sensors & processing systems: Radar: Fut -N air-search radar; Ryf surface-search radar; Sonar: Pegas
- Armament: as designed: 1 × SS-N-1 anti shipping missile launcher; (8 re-load missiles); 4 × quad 57 mm guns; 2 × dual 533 mm torpedo tubes; 2 × RBU-2500 w/ 128 RGB-25; 2 × RPK-8 Zapad/RBU-6000 12 tubed mortar launchers; as modernised: 4 × SS-N-2 anti shipping missile launchers; 2 × dual 76mm guns; 4 × quad 57 mm guns; 2 × dual 533 mm torpedo tubes; 2 × RBU-2500 w/ 128 RGB-25, 2 × RPK-8 Zapad/RBU-6000 12 tubed mortar launchers

Bedovy was the lead ship of the Kildin-class destroyer of the Soviet Navy.

== Construction and career ==
The ship was built at Zhdanov Shipyard in Leningrad and was launched on 31 July 1955 and commissioned on 30 June 1958.

On May 19, 1966, she was reclassified into a Large Missile Ship (DBK), on January 26, 1973 - into a Large Anti-Submarine Ship (BOD), and on June 26, 1977, it was again returned to the DBK.

In the period from October 7, 1970, to July 15, 1971, she performed combat missions to provide assistance to the Egyptian armed forces.

In the period from July 18, 1972, to January 25, 1974, she was modernized at the Sevmorzavod, Sevastopol according to the Project 56-U. Subsequently, from April 23, 1981, to May 14, 1984, a major overhaul was also carried out there.

After modernization in 1974, she served in the Mediterranean, where she was responsible for the surveillance of the aircraft carriers USS Franklin D. Roosevelt, Forrestal and Saratoga. On August 30, 1974, together with Soznatelny, Komsomolets Ukrainy and Beshtau, took part in the rescue operations of Otvazhny in the Black Sea.

From 10 to 21 April 1975, she took part in the exercises Okean-75. May 15 - June 13, 1984 took part in the Okean-84 exercise in the Mediterranean Sea (the topic of the exercise: "he defeat of the enemy's AMG OS RUS in cooperation with the Black Sea Fleet Air Force MRA). The exercises were also attended by Zhdanov, Komsomolets Ukrainy, Sderzhanny, Stroyny, Udaloy, Nakhodchivy, Soznatelny, Neulovimy, Silny, Druzhny, Volk, Zarnitsa, K-298, Kildin, Desna, etc.

April 25, 1989, she was disarmed and expelled from the Navy in connection with the transfer to the OFI for dismantling and implementation. On August 5 of the same year, she was sold to a private Turkish company for dismantling.
