= Soviet destroyer Neulovimy =

Kildin-class destroyer

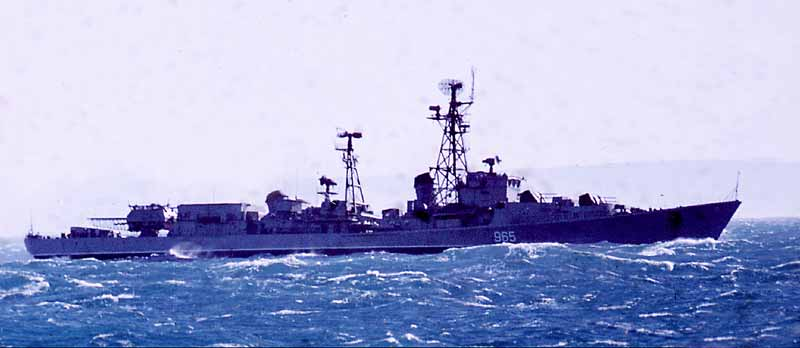
- Neulovimy in January 1970

History

Soviet Union
- Name: Neulovimy; (Неуловимый)
- Namesake: Elusive in Russian
- Ordered: 29 April 1954
- Builder: Zhdanov Shipyard
- Laid down: 23 February 1957
- Launched: 27 February 1958
- Commissioned: 30 December 1958
- Decommissioned: 19 April 1990
- Fate: Scrapped, 1991

General characteristics
- Class & type: Kildin-class destroyer
- Displacement: 2,662 long tons (2,705 t) standard; 3,230 long tons (3,282 t) full load
- Length: 126.1 m (414 ft)
- Beam: 12.7 m (42 ft)
- Draught: 4.2 m (14 ft)
- Installed power: 72,000 hp (54,000 kW)
- Propulsion: 2 × shaft geared steam turbines; 4 × boilers
- Speed: 38 kn (70 km/h; 44 mph)
- Complement: 273
- Sensors & processing systems: Radar: Fut -N air-search radar; Ryf surface-search radar; Sonar: Pegas
- Armament: as designed: 1 × SS-N-1 anti shipping missile launcher; (8 re-load missiles); 4 × quad 57 mm guns; 2 × dual 533 mm torpedo tubes; 2 × RBU-2500 w/ 128 RGB-25; 2 × RPK-8 Zapad/RBU-6000 12 tubed mortar launchers; as modernised: 4 × SS-N-2 anti shipping missile launchers; 2 × dual 76mm guns; 4 × quad 57 mm guns; 2 × dual 533 mm torpedo tubes; 2 × RBU-2500 w/ 128 RGB-25, 2 × RPK-8 Zapad/RBU-6000 12 tubed mortar launchers

Neulovimy was the second ship of the Kildin-class destroyer of the Soviet Navy.

== Construction and career ==
The ship was built at Zhdanov Shipyard in Leningrad and was launched on 27 February 1958 and commissioned on 30 December 1958.

On March 8, 1960, she was included in the Red Banner Baltic Fleet (KBF).

On May 19, 1966, she was reclassified into a Large Missile Ship (DBK), on January 26, 1973 - into a Large Anti-Submarine Ship (BOD), and on August 3, 1977, it was again returned to the DBK class.

In 1969, she carried out a mission to the coast of Africa, where it paid a visit to Conakry, Guinea in February, and to Lagos, Nigeria in March. After returning, on April 7, 1969, she was assigned to the Red Banner Black Sea Fleet (KChF).

In the period from December 2, 1971 to October 4, 1972, it was modernized at Sevmorzavod, Sevastopol according to the Project 56-U.

On June 6, 1974, the ship was decommissioned, mothballed and put in Sevastopol, but eight years later, on March 18, 1982, it was reactivated and put back into operation.

From 10 to 21 April 1975, she took part in the exercises Okean-75. May 15 - June 13, 1984 took part in the Okean-84 exercise in the Mediterranean Sea (the topic of the exercise: she defeat of the enemy's AMG OS RUS in cooperation with the Black Sea Fleet Air Force MRA). The exercises were also attended by Zhdanov, Komsomolets Ukrainy, Sderzhanny, Stroyny, Udaloy, Nakhodchivy, Soznatelny, Bedovy, Silny, Druzhny, Volk, Zarnitsa, K-298, Kildin, Desna, etc.

On April 19, 1990, she was disarmed and expelled from the Navy in connection with the transfer to the OFI for dismantling and sale. On February 11, 1991 it was disbanded and subsequently sold to a private Italian company for cutting into metal.
