= DOSAAF of Russia =

Russian paramilitary volunteer organization

DOSAAF
- Voluntary Society for Assistance to the Army, Aviation and Navy of Russia
- Добровольное общество содействия армии, авиации и флоту России
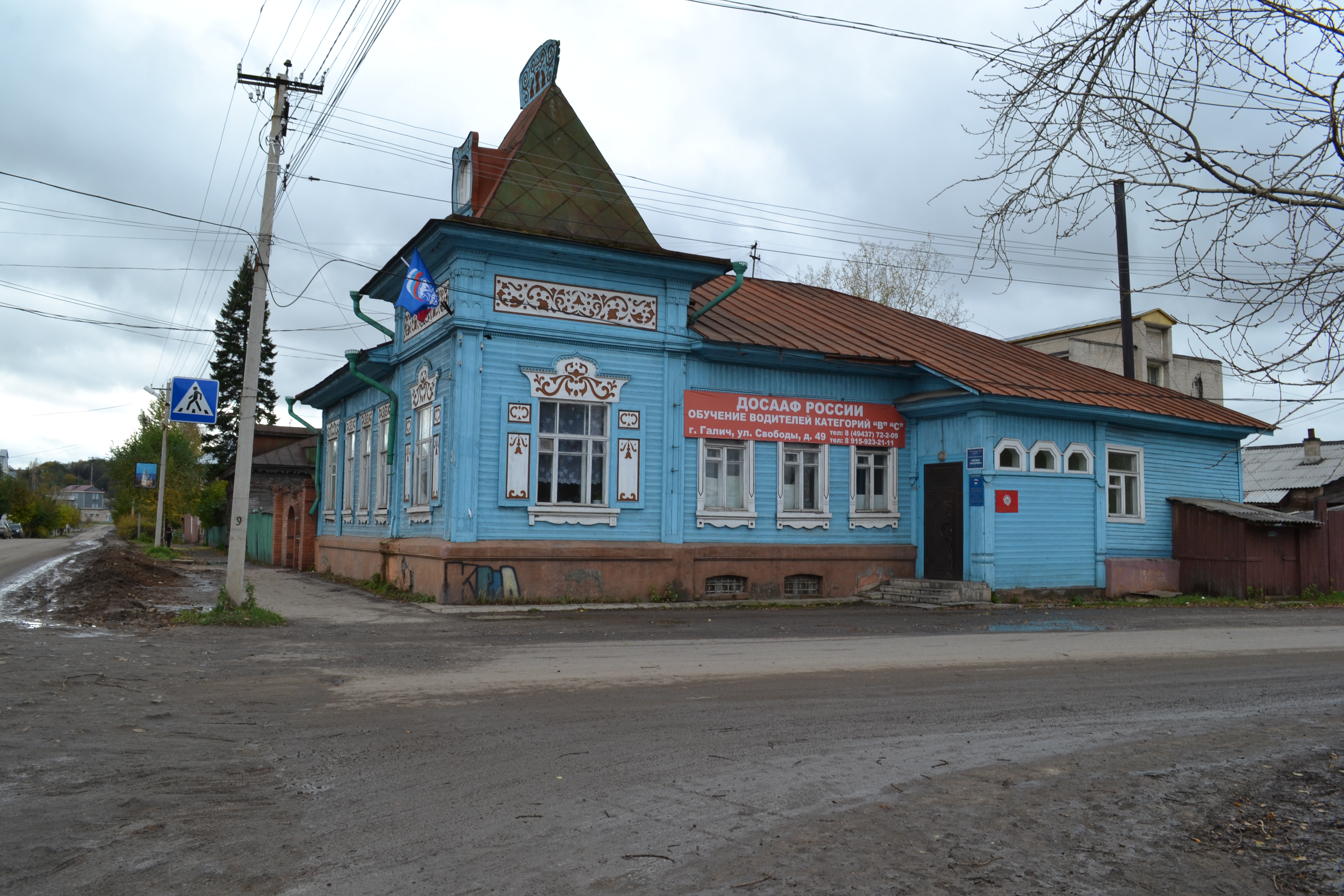
- DOSAAF office in Galich, Kostroma Oblast
- Predecessor: DOSAAF
- Formation: September 25, 1991; 35 years ago
- Headquarters: Moscow, Russia
- Coordinates: 55°49′26″N 37°26′35″E
- Official language: Russian
- Subsidiaries: Young Army Cadets National Movement
- Website: dosaaf.ru

DOSAAF of Russia (Russian: Добровольное общество содействия армии, авиации и флоту России (ДОСААФ России)) is an all-Russian volunteer public-state organization (общественно-государственная организация), an indirect successor of the Soviet DOSAAF, with the declared purpose of strengthening of the country's defense capability and national security. In addition, DOSAAF members will take part in the elimination of the consequences of emergency situations, such as catastrophes natural disasters, helping the Ministry of Emergency Situations.

== History ==
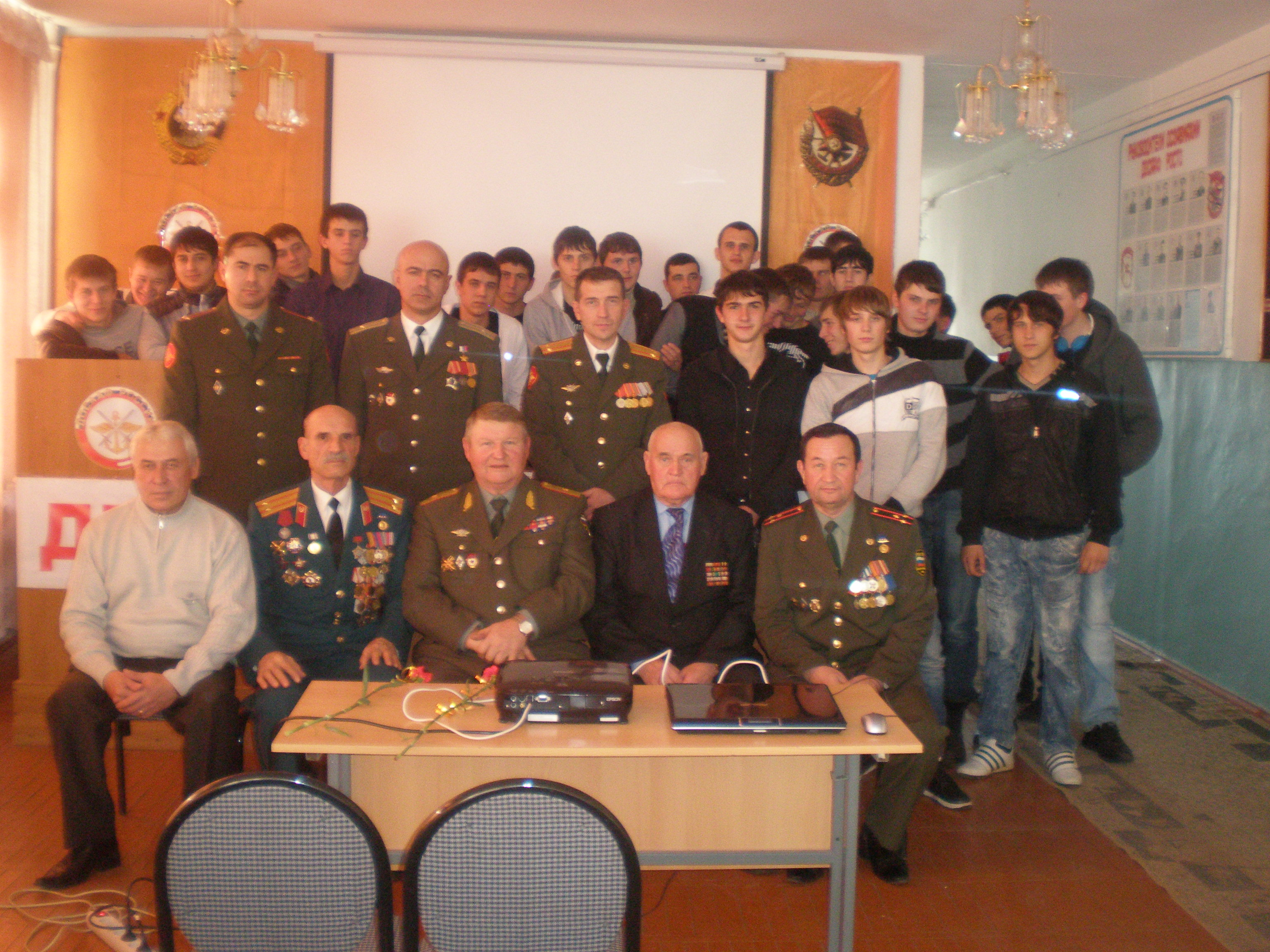
A meeting of DOSAAF in Maykop, 2011

On September 25, 1991, the Russian part of DOSAAF was reformed into the Russian Defense Sports-Technical Organization (ROSTO; Russian: Российская оборонная спортивно-техническая организация – РОСТО). In December 2009, ROSTO was reorganized into DOSAAF of Russia. DOSAAF became a hybrid public-state organization under the aegis of the Ministry of Defence and its first chairman (2009-2014) was the director of the Rosoboronzakaz, general Sergey Mayev.

In 2023 a parallel structure was established, the Center for Military-Sports Training and Patriotic Upbringing of the Youth "Voin" headed by Sergei Avakyants, citing the organizational drawbacks of DOSAAF which turned out to be incapable to provide initial military training of the youth.

In 2024 DOSAAF was sanctioned by Canada due to the Russian invasion of Ukraine
