= Viktor Mardusin =

Russian naval officer

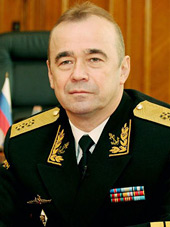
- Born: 18 March 1958 (age 68); Bryansk, Russian SFSR, USSR
- Allegiance: Soviet Union; Russia
- Branch: Soviet Navy; Russian Navy
- Service years: 1975–present
- Rank: Vice-Admiral
- Commands: Baltic Fleet
- Awards: Order of Military Merit; Order of Naval Merit; Order "For Service to the Homeland in the Armed Forces of the USSR" Third Class

Viktor Nikolayevich Mardusin (Russian: Виктор Николаевич Мардусин; born 18 March 1958) is an officer of the Russian Navy. He currently holds the rank of vice-admiral, and has most recently served as deputy commander of the Western Military District.

A native of Bryansk, Mardusin began his service in the Soviet Navy, after attending the P. S. Nakhimov Black Sea Higher Naval School. His early career was spent in the Baltic Fleet, where he served aboard several small missile ships, rising through the ranks and eventually taking command of one of the fleet's elderly destroyers, just prior to her decommissioning. After further studies at the navy's higher educational institutions, Mardusin served as commander of divisions and then brigades of small missile ships, before serving in staff officer positions as commander of a naval base, and as deputy and chief of staff of several of the navy's fleets. During his time as Deputy Commander of the Pacific Fleet, he visited the US naval base at Pearl Harbor and met with US naval officers.

Mardusin then spent two years as commander of the Baltic Fleet, where he had begun his naval service decades earlier. This posting was marked with the deployment of one of his fleet's warships to counter piracy off the coast of Somalia. Stepping down as commander of the Baltic Fleet in 2009, Mardusin became Deputy Chief of the Military Academy of the General Staff of the Armed Forces of Russia, and in 2013 was appointed deputy commander of the Western Military District. Over his career he has received several awards, including the Order of Military Merit, the Order of Naval Merit, and the Soviet Order "For Service to the Homeland in the Armed Forces of the USSR" Third Class.

== Early service ==
Mardusin was born on 18 March 1958 in Bryansk, then part of the Russian Soviet Federative Socialist Republic, in the Soviet Union. He attended the P. S. Nakhimov Black Sea Higher Naval School, graduating in 1980. Mardusin's initial service was spent with the Baltic Fleet, where he started out as a commander of the anti-aircraft missile battery of a small missile ship, rising through the ranks to serve as weapons commander of the Nanuchka-class small missile ship Grad, and then as assistant commander of a Molniya-class small missile ship.

In 1986 Mardusin became senior assistant commander of the Kilden-class destroyer Prozorliviy, and in 1988 he became commander of the destroyer Speshny. The Speshny was an elderly Kotlin-class destroyer which had first joined the Soviet Navy in 1955. She was decommissioned in 1989. During this period Mardusin took the navy's Higher Special Officer Classes, graduating in 1986, and the classes at the N. G. Kuznetsov Naval Academy, graduating in 1991. Following his graduation from the Naval Academy, Mardusin was given command of the 106th division of small missile ships, and between 1991 and 1996 held the posts of chief of staff and deputy brigade commander, and then commander of the 36th missile ship brigade. In 1996 he was appointed chief of staff and first deputy commander of the Baltic Naval Base at Baltiysk, and after a period of study at the Military Academy of the General Staff of the Armed Forces of Russia, from which Mardusin graduated in 2000, from July 2000 to May 2001 he served as Deputy Chief of Staff of the Baltic Fleet.

== Command rank and staff postings ==
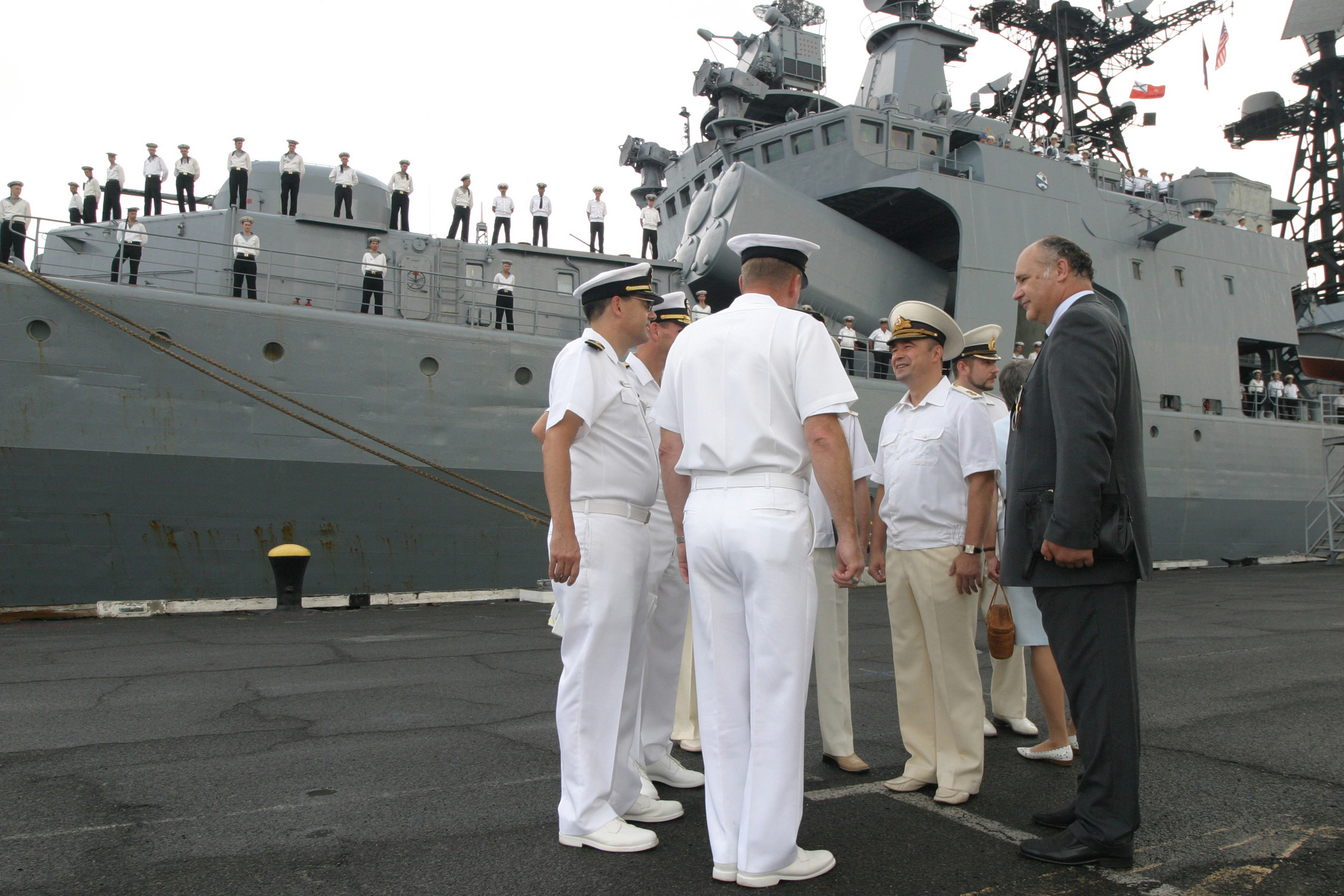
Mardusin, second from right, meeting with US Navy officers at Pearl Harbor. In the background is the Marshal Shaposhnikov.

Mardusin's next posting, from May 2001 to August 2003, was as commander of the Baltic Naval Base, followed by his transfer in August 2003 to take up his new role as Deputy Commander of the Pacific Fleet. On 4 November 2003 Mardusin visited Pearl Harbor as part of a naval visit to the American base by the Udaloy-class destroyer Marshal Shaposhnikov and the Dubna-class tanker Pechenga. He met with US admirals Jonathan Greenert, Thomas B. Fargo and Barry McCullough during the visit, which marked the first time Russian ships had visited Pearl Harbor since 1995.

Mardusin held the post of Deputy Commander of the Pacific Fleet until March 2005. On 9 March 2005 he was appointed Chief of Staff of the Black Sea Fleet, before returning to the Pacific Fleet as its chief of staff from 6 May 2006 until 6 December 2007. On 6 December 2007 he was appointed commander of the Baltic Fleet. During his period in command, Somali pirates captured the Ukrainian cargo vessel MV Faina, with several Russian crewmen among the hostages. The Neustrashimy-class frigate Neustrashimy was dispatched from the Baltic Fleet to patrol off the Somali coast, with Mardusin stating that the frigate would be deployed "for more than two months in order to guarantee the safety of Russian ships." On the Neustrashimy's return to base in February 2009, Mardusin welcomed her crew, and as per tradition, presented her commander, Captain 2nd Rank Alexei Apanovich, with a roasted piglet.

Mardusin was commander of the Baltic Fleet until 8 September 2009. He had by that time, on 1 September 2009, been appointed Deputy Chief of the Military Academy of the General Staff of the Armed Forces. On 4 October 2013 Mardusin was appointed deputy commander of the Western Military District, replacing Lieutenant General Oleg Makarevich, who was appointed Chief of Staff of the Eastern Military District.

== Awards ==
Over his career Mardusin had received the Order "For Service to the Homeland in the Armed Forces of the USSR" Third Class, the Order of Military Merit, and the Order of Naval Merit. He is married, with a daughter and a son.
