= Sergei Avakyants =

Russian admiral

Sergei Iosifovich Avakyants
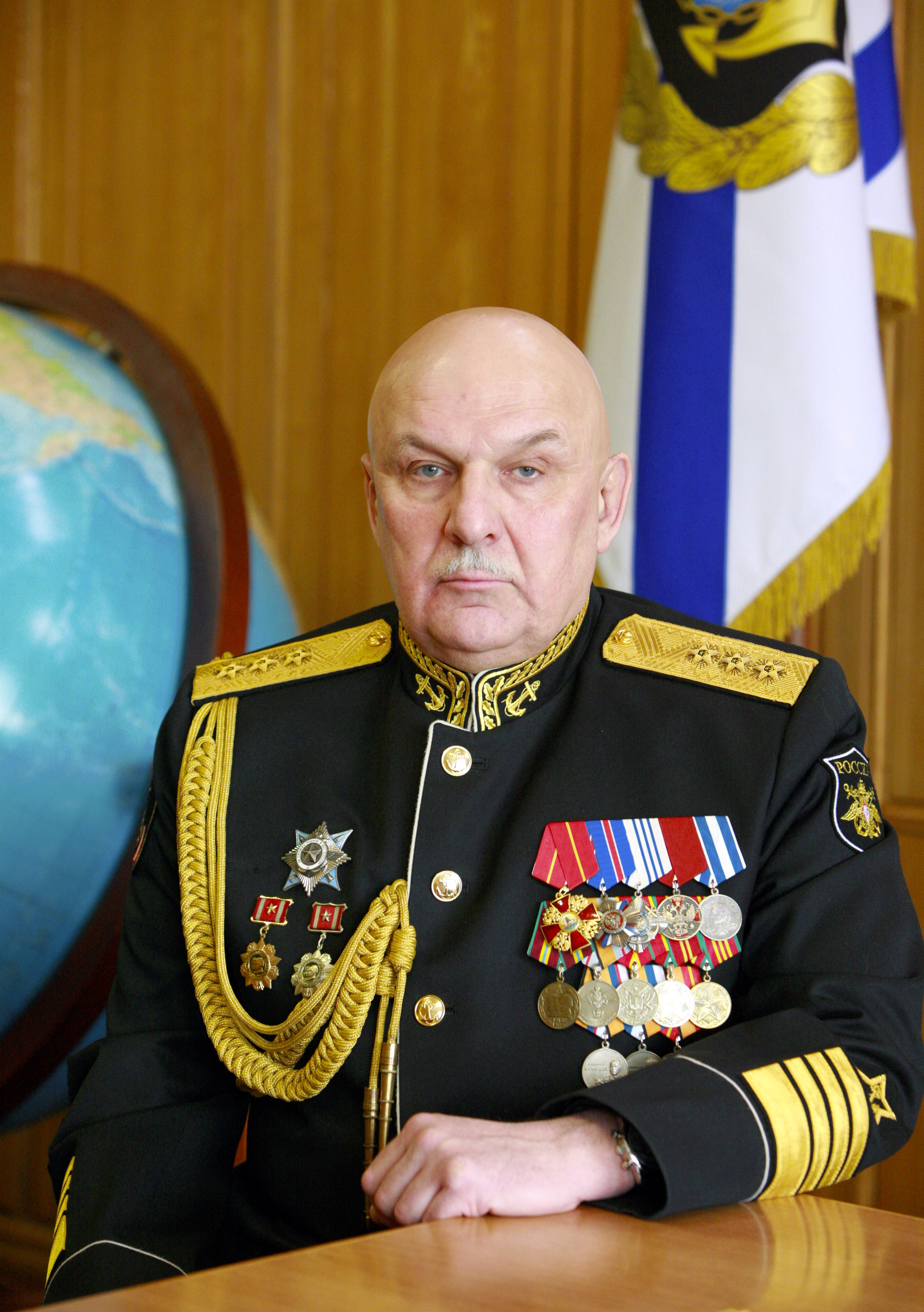
- Sergey Avakyants
- Born: 6 April 1958 (age 68); Yerevan, Armenian SSR, Soviet Union
- Allegiance: Soviet Union (to 1991); Russia
- Branch: Soviet Navy; Russian Navy
- Service years: 1975–2023
- Rank: Admiral
- Commands: Pacific Fleet
- Awards: Order of Naval Merit; Order for Service to the Homeland in the Armed Forces of the USSR, 3rd class

Admiral Sergei Iosifovich Avakyants (Russian: Серге́й Ио́сифович Авакя́нц, Armenian: Սերգեյ Իոսիֆի Ավագյանց; b. 6 April 1957) is a Russian retired naval officer and a recipient of the Order of Naval Merit and the Order for Service to the Homeland in the Armed Forces of the USSR.

== Biography ==
=== Early life ===
Avakyants was born on 6 April 1957 in Yerevan, Armenia as the son of an Armenian naval officer and a Russian mother.

=== Education ===
He graduated from Nakhimov Higher Naval School in 1980 and took the Higher Special Officer Classes of the Navy from 1989 to 1991. Seven years later, he graduated from the Kuznetsov Naval Academy.

=== Career ===
He served in the Northern Fleet and commanded the missile and gunnery section of the cruiser Admiral Yumashev.

He went on to serve on the missile cruiser Admiral of the Fleet Lobov, later renamed Marshal Ustinov. From 1991 to 1996, he was commanding officer of the same cruiser. By October 1996, he was a deputy commander and in 2001 commanded a missile ship division of the Northern Fleet.

From 2004 to 2007 he became chief of staff of an Operational Squadron of the Northern Fleet. He took courses between 2005 and 2007 at the Military Academy of the General Staff of the Armed Forces of Russia and in June that year became chief of staff at Novorossiysk Naval Base of Black Sea Fleet. In August of the same year he became a deputy commander of both Primorye Flotilla and the Pacific Fleet.

Since May 2012 he has been, by Decree of the Russian President, commander of the Pacific Fleet. Between 26 and 30 July 2018, Avakyants hosted First Admiral Pengiran Dato Seri Pahlawan Norazmi bin Pengiran Haji Muhammad, commander of the Royal Brunei Navy on his first official visit to Russia.

In December 2018, he announced plans for the modernization of the Pacific Fleet, including modern submarines and surface ships, and the refitting of existing vessels to carry the 3M-54 Kalibr cruise missile.

On 21 April 2023, he was removed from his position as commander of the Pacific fleet, and Putin's envoy Yury Trutnev announced that Avakyants will head a new organization that will oversee military pilots' centers of sports training and patriotic education. Eventually, he headed a new Center for Military-Sports Training and Patriotic Education "Voin".

Military offices
Preceded by Himself	Commander of the Pacific Fleet; 2012–2023	Succeeded by Viktor Liina
Preceded by Konstantin Sidenko	Commander of the Pacific Fleet; Acting; 2010–2012	Succeeded by Himself
Preceded by Viktor Mardusin	Chief of Staff and First Deputy Commander of the Pacific Fleet; 2010–2012	Succeeded by Vladimir Kasatonov
