= Pacific Higher Naval School =

Russian naval academy in Vladivostok

Coordinates: 43°08′33″N 131°54′47″E

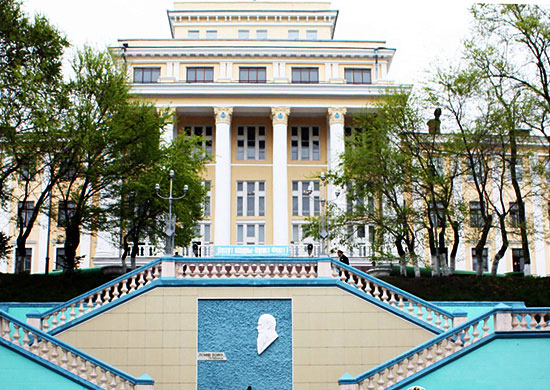
The school building.

The Makarov Pacific Higher Naval School (Russian: Тихоокеанское высшее военно-морское училище имени С. О. Макарова, romanized: Tikhookeanskoye vyssheye voyenno-morskoye uchilishche imeni S. O. Makarova) is one of the Russian Navy's two higher educational institutions under the Ministry of Defense of Russia, with this school being located in Vladivostok in Eastern Russia, the only naval educational institution in this region. It serves as a naval officer commissioning school for officers in the Pacific Fleet. It is named after the accomplished Russian oceanographer and commander of the Imperial Russian Navy, Vice-Admiral Stepan Makarov.

== History ==
It was first established as the Third Naval School on 8 November 1937 on the basis of a resolution Council of People's Commissars of the USSR on the formation of a naval school in the Far East. The school year began in January 1938, with first cadets being freshmen from the Frunze Naval School in Leningrad. It was renamed to the Pacific Naval School (TOVMU) in May 1939, and in 1940, the school was given the status of a university. On 21 April 1954, it received its current honorific name of Admiral Makarov. In September 1951, a navigational faculty and a mine-torpedo faculty was established at the school. Additional faculties were established in 1969, 1978 and 1995. Since 2009, the institute ceased to be an independent educational institution and became a branch of the Kuznetsov Naval Academy. In 2009, 18 females were admitted to the Faculty of Radio Communication for the first time. In 2014, the institute received the status of a Higher Naval School.

Since its foundation, the school has graduated around 13,000 naval officers. Graduation from the school is correlated with higher rates of promotion to the rank of vice admiral.

== Structure ==
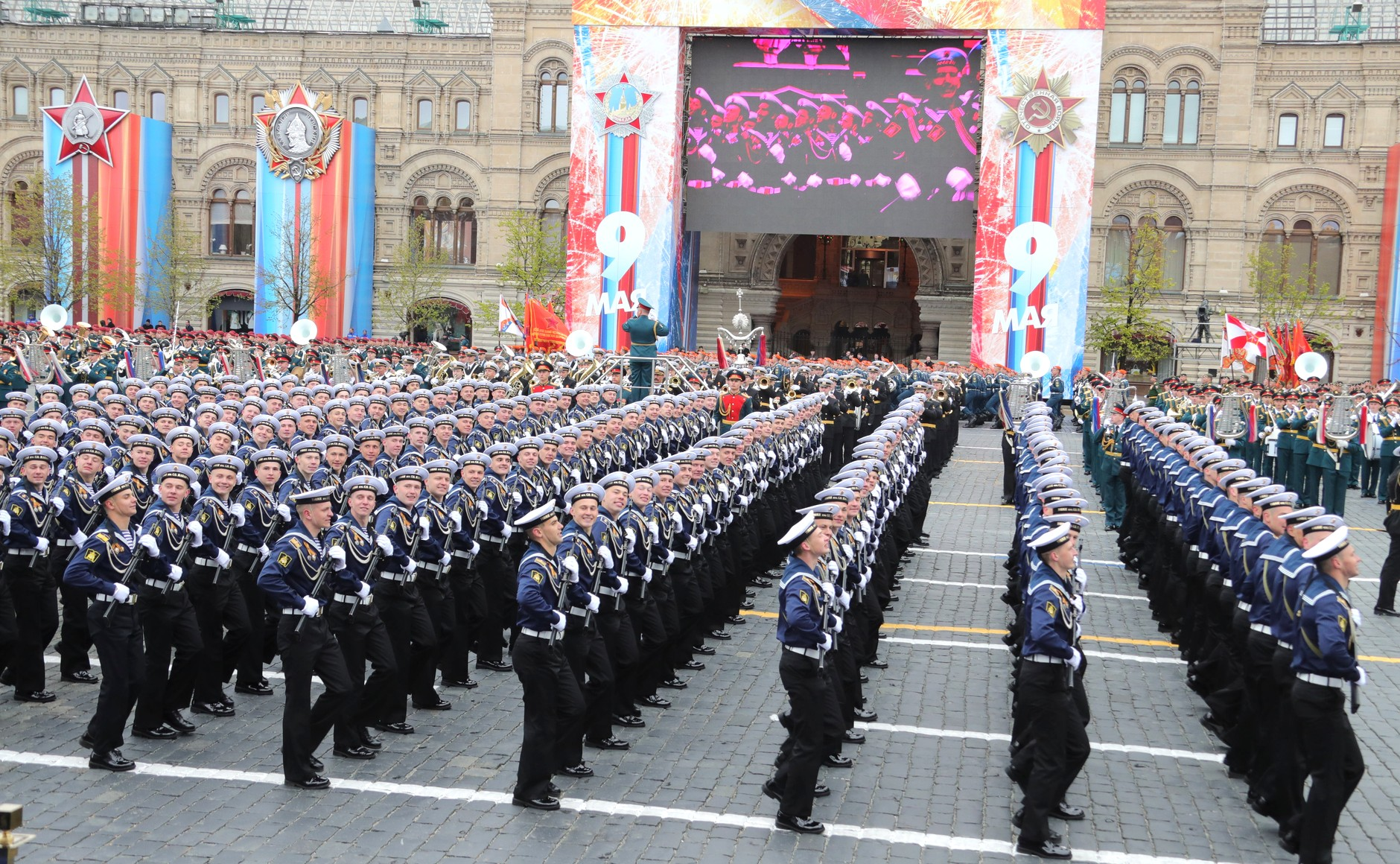
Cadets of the school marching during the 2017 Moscow Victory Day Parade on Red Square.

Training of cadets is carried out at six faculties and one affiliated school.

- Faculty of Navigation
- Faculty of Mines and Torpedoes
- Faculty of Radio Engineering
- Faculty of Radio Communication
- Faculty of Coastal Forces and Naval Aviation Weapons
- School of Technicians

== Heads of the school ==
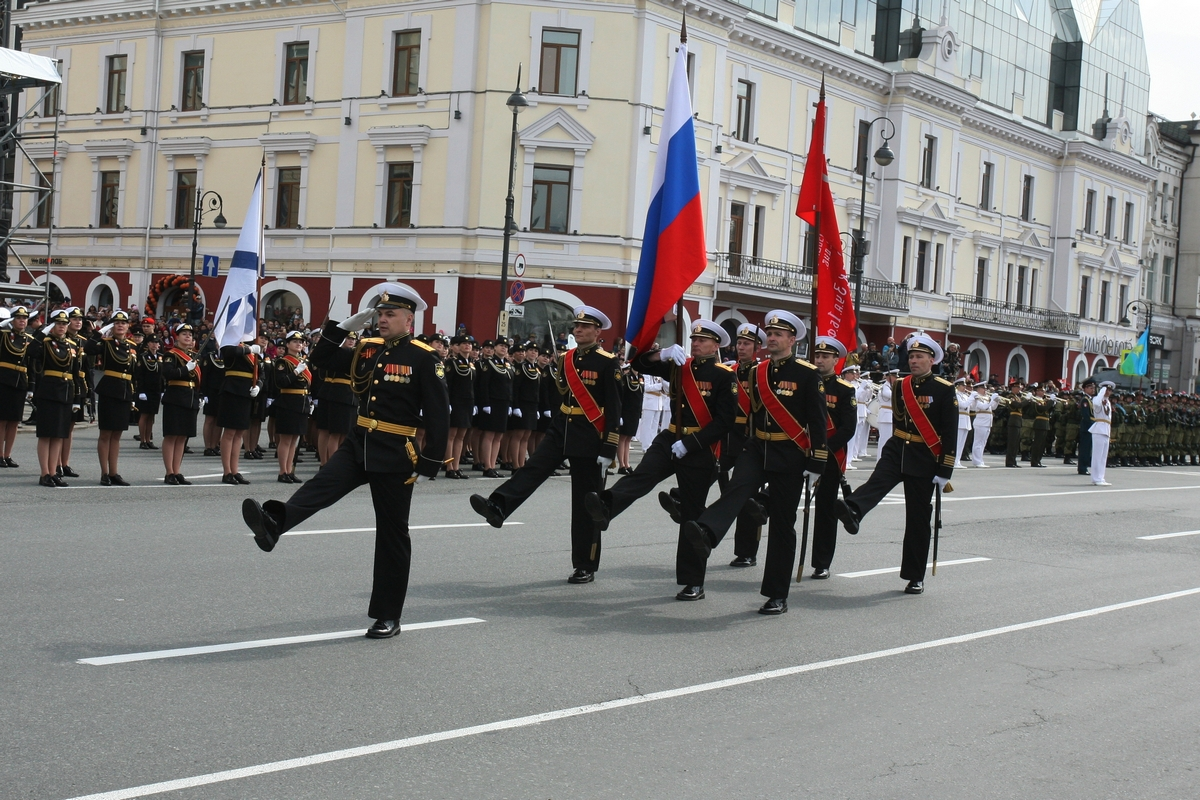
The school colour guard.

- Regimental Commissar Alexander Baruzdin (1937–1938)
- Captain 2nd Rank Alexey Poskotinov (1938–1943)
- Rear Admiral Krill Osipov (1943–1945)
- Rear Admiral Alexey Barinov (1951–1954)
- Vice-Admiral Pyotr Plotnikov (?—1965)
- Vice Admiral Valentin Starikov (1965–1972)
- Vice Admiral Boris Potekhin (1972–1977)
- Rear Admiral Boris Davidovich (1977–1980)
- Rear Admiral Igor Karmadonov (1980–1986)
- Rear Admiral Alexey Belousov (1986–1994)
- Vice-Admiral Valery Kozhevnikov (1994–2002)
- Vice Admiral Yevgeny Litvinenko (2002–2007)
- Captain 1st Rank Igor Leukhin (2007–2010)
- Rear Admiral Oleg Garamov (2010–2012)
- Captain 1st Rank Alexander Shevchenko (2012–2018)
- Rear Admiral Oleg Zhuravlev (2018—Present)

== Distinguished graduates of the school ==
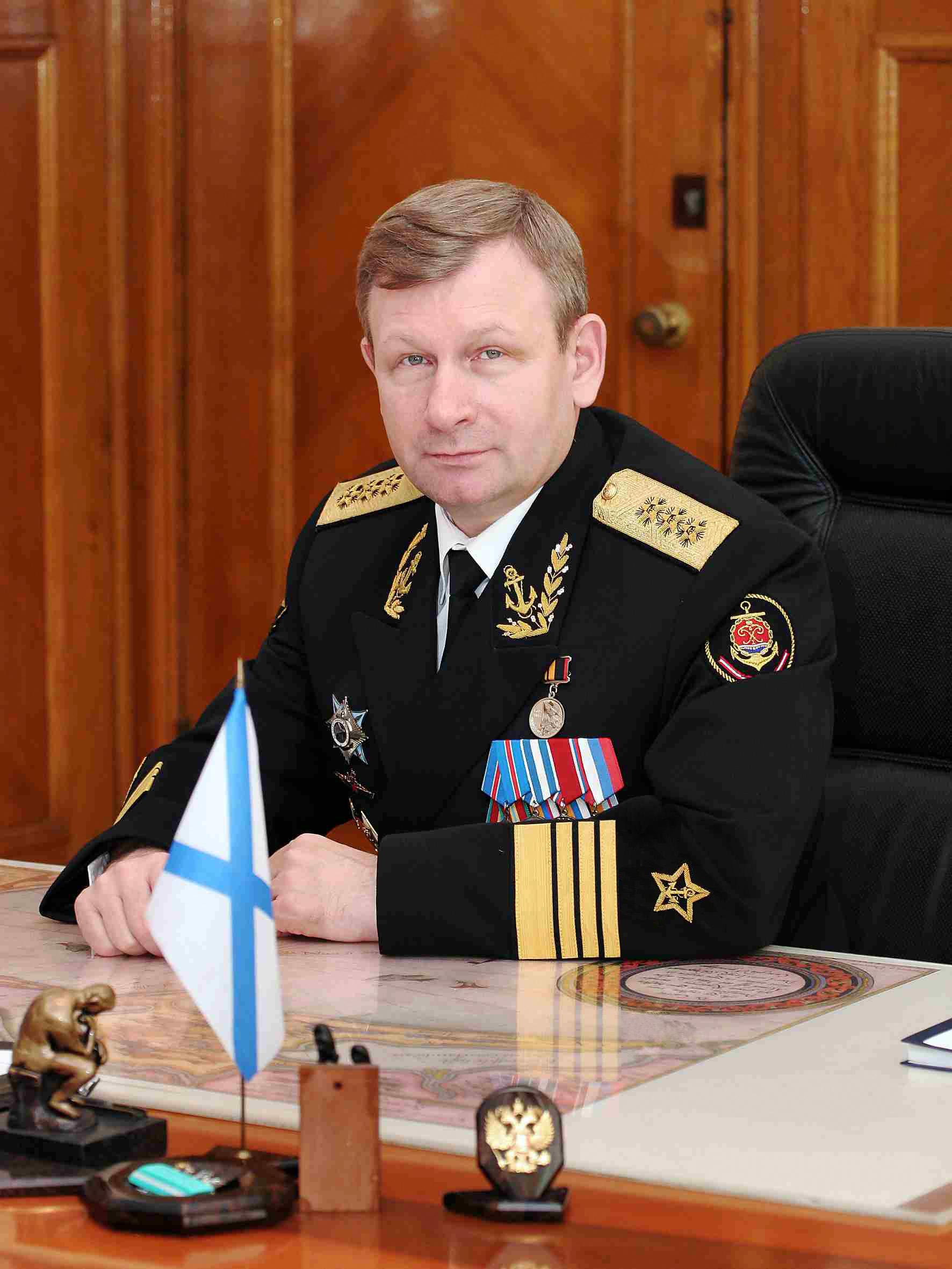
Viktor Chirkov

- Viktor Chirkov, former Commander-in-Chief of the Russian Navy
- Mikhail Khronopulo, former Commander of the Black Sea Fleet
- Vasily Arkhipov, a Soviet Navy officer credited with preventing a Soviet nuclear strike during the Cuban Missile Crisis.

== See also ==
- Far Eastern Higher Combined Arms Command School
