= Young Army Cadets National Movement =

Military youth movement in Russia

- All-Russian Military Patriotic Social Movement "Young Army"
- Юнармия
- Logo of the Young Army Cadets National Movement

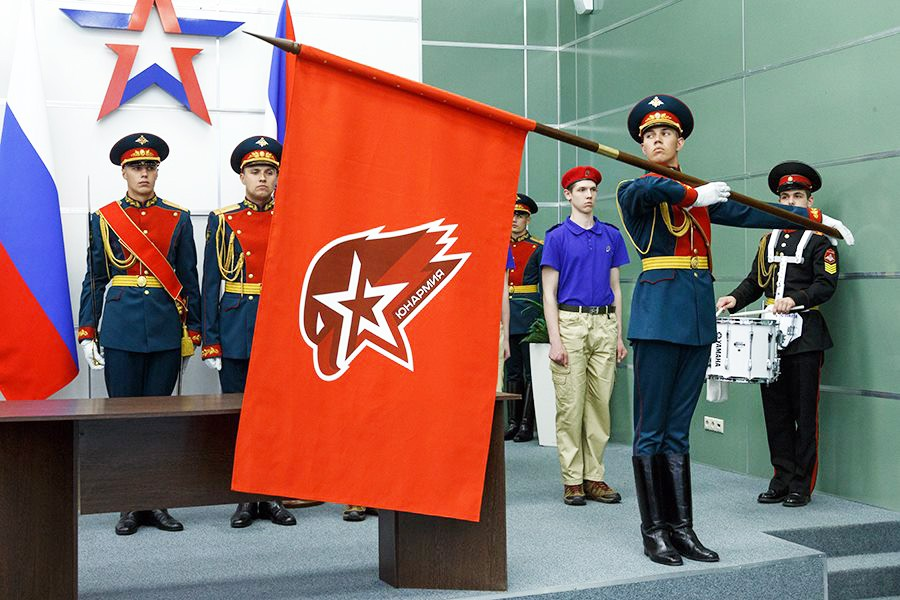
- Formation: October 29, 2015; 11 years ago (presidential decree); July 29, 2016; 10 years ago (state registration)
- Founder: Sergey Shoigu
- Headquarters: 1st Krasnokursantsky passage, 1/4, building 1, Moscow, Russia
- Official language: Russian
- Chief of the Main Staff: Nikita Nagornyy
- Parent organization: DOSAAF
- Website: yunarmy.ru

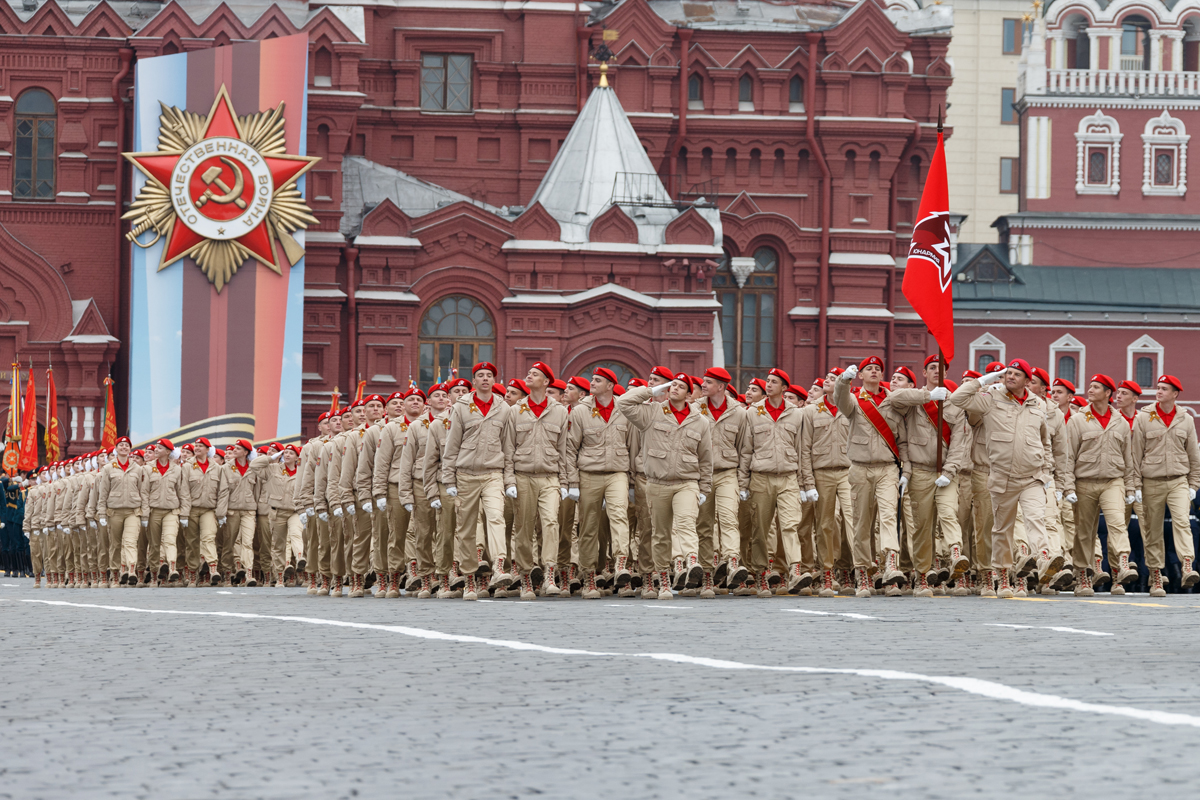
The Young Army on the Red Square, Moscow, 9 May 2019

The All-Russian Military Patriotic Social Movement "Young Army" (Russian: Всероссийское военно-патриотическое общественное движение «Юнармия», romanized: Vserossiyskoye voyenno-patrioticheskoye obshchestvennoye dvizhenne "Yunarmiya") is a youth organization supported and funded by the Government of Russia through the Ministry of Defence with a mission to train future personnel for the uniformed services. Established in October 2015, its purposes are to instill the values of patriotism, national service, national and military history, remembrance of past military operations and campaigns and of the fallen of its armed forces, and to help develop the country as its population grows.

While being a successor to the military courses in both the Vladimir Lenin All-Union Pioneer Organization and the Komsomol during Soviet times, and keeping the traditions of the Great Patriotic War services of these organizations, it is affiliated with the Russian Armed Forces, DOSAAF and the MOD Armed Forces Central Sports Society.

== Overview ==
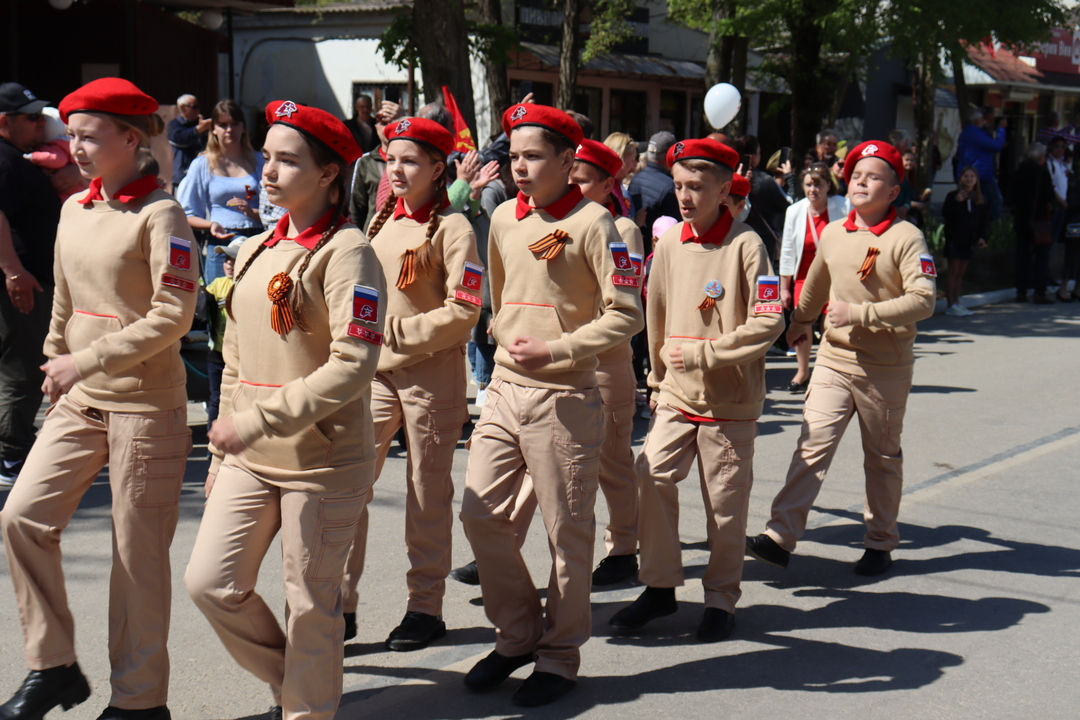
The Young Army in Crimea, 9 May 2022

This national movement was a part of a larger range of youth programs, clubs and organizations which were created in 1990. The initial movement's motto was "For the glory of the Fatherland!". Modern YAM was formally established by presidential decree issued on 29 October 2015 by President of Russia Vladimir Putin at the behest of Minister of Defense General of the Army Sergey Shoygu. The Young Army Movement's aims are to improve the state policy in the field of education of the younger generation, create favorable environment for the harmonious development of the personality of children and young people, the formation of moral values and guidelines, as well as education in military and patriotic themes. By late 2024, the Movement claimed to have 1.3 million members.

Thus, the Young Army Cadets (Юнармеец), as they are called, are from a wide number of youth groups and the Cadet Corps and Schools all over the country, the latter preparing youth for service within the Armed Forces. The YAM thus forms the military division of the wider Russian Youth and Students Movement, formed in 2015 under the Federal Service of Supervision of Education and Science, Ministry of Education and Science of the Russian Federation. Critics have described the organization as the Russian equivalent of the Hitler Youth and a modern, republican form of the Soviet Komsomol and Young Pioneers. In 2016 Russian minister of defense Sergei Shoigu stated that allegations over increased militarization of Russians were "far from true".

According to Ukrainian military intelligence, in February 2022, the Russian Defence Minister ordered an assessment of the potential use of Yunarmiya members in the war in Ukraine after their conscription into the Russian Armed forces. In July 2022 the EU imposed sanctions on the Young Army Cadets National Movement in relation to the 2022 Russian invasion of Ukraine. Members of the Wagner Group have reportedly been providing weapons training to Ukrainian children inside occupied areas of Ukraine.

=== Uniform and traditions ===
Young Army Cadets are distinguished by their red berets. Young Army Movement members wear beige uniforms(used since early 2016), while their component organizations and Cadet Corps wear their own uniforms (the latter military-styled), with peaked caps (summer, ushankas during the winter in some cases) and/or sailor caps (the latter for naval cadets). Colour guard escorts occasionally sport sabres while in the full dress or service uniform on parades. The main colors of the movement are red and beige, but colors such as black, blue, light blue, turquoise, orange and green can also be worn (applies to berets, polos, T-shirts, and shoelaces). The color is set by the Chiefs of Staff.

=== Leadership ===
The heads of the regional branches are selected at the rallies of the Yunarmiya. In October 2016, ex-commander of the Russian Airborne Forces Vladimir Shamanov was elected as the head of the Moscow Branch of the organization. The regional headquarters of the Moscow Oblast is headed by the Olympic champion Alexander Legkov. Working under the National Headquarters are a number of famous athletes, cosmonauts and actors dedicated to assist in the work of the organization. In October 2017, Yelena Slesarenko, two-time world champion in jumping, was appointed Chief of Staff at the Yunarmiya Main Staff. Since 2018, Nikita Mikhalkov has been the senior mentor of the Yunarmiya.

==== Chief of the Main Staff ====
The organization is led by a person holding the position of Chief of the Main Staff of the National Movement (Russian: Начальник Главного штаба). He or she is responsible for the overall supervision of the National Movement and its partner and affiliate organizations nationwide.

- Dmitry Trunenkov (2016–2018), a Russian bobsledder
- Major (ret) Roman Romanenko (2018-2020), a retired cosmonaut at the Yuri Gagarin Cosmonaut Training Center
- Nikita Nagornyy (since 19 December 2020), a Russian artistic gymnast and Olympic champion

== Activities of the Young Army Movement ==
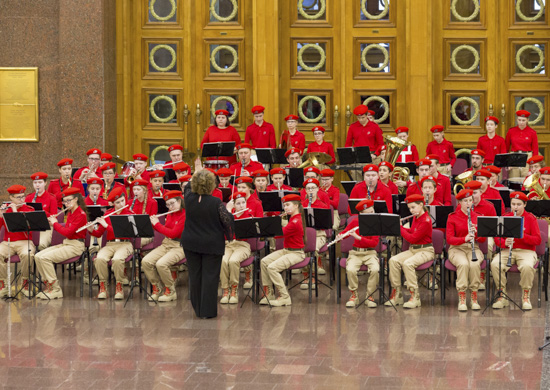
The Central Brass Band.

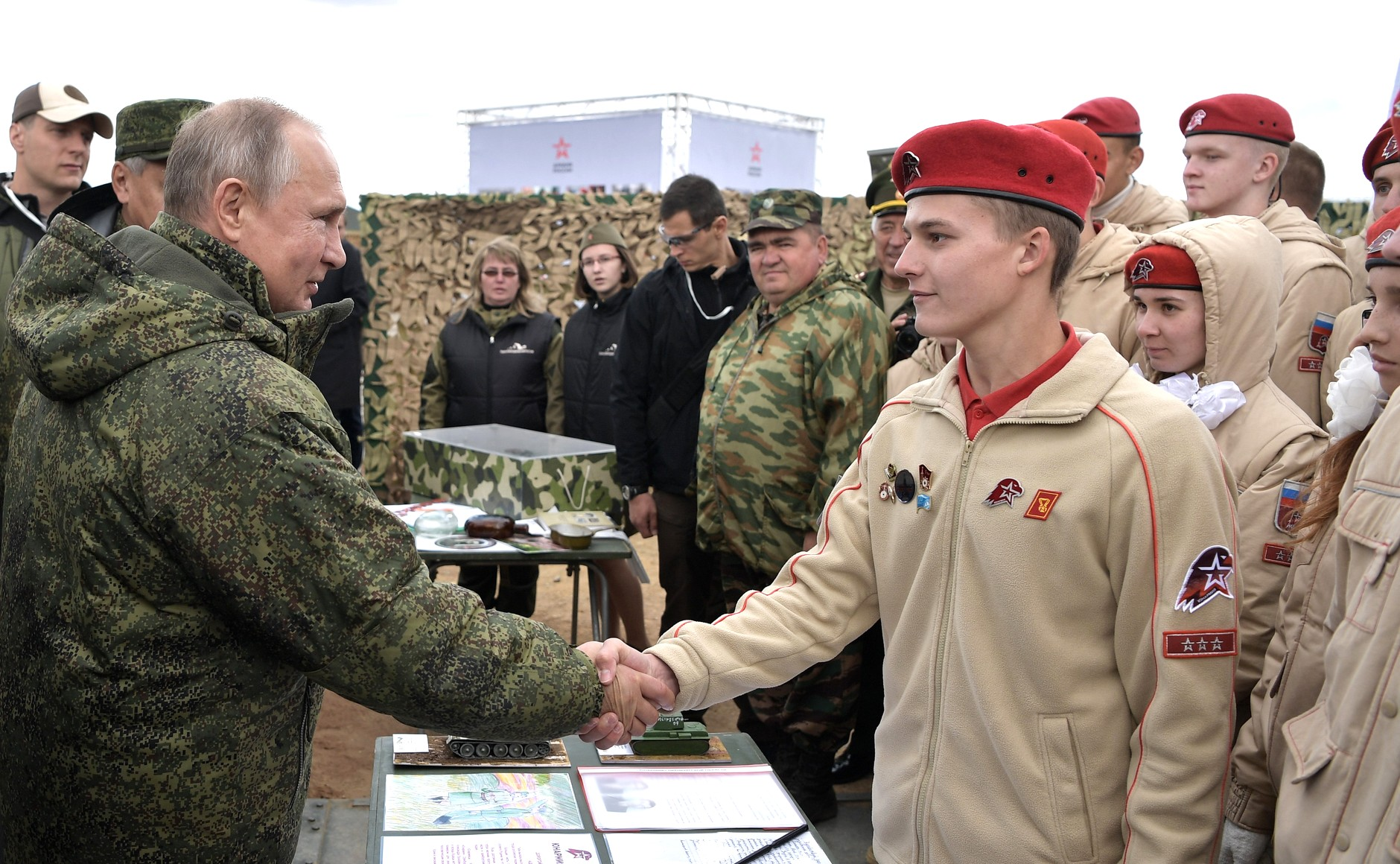
Russian President Vladimir Putin with members of the Young Army

The basic activities of YAM range from preparation for military services to participation in social events like celebrations.

- Firearm training
- First aid and medical assistance
- Pathfinding
- Ceremonial duties: including guardianship, marching, arms drill, giving oath etc.
- Hand combat and martial arts
- Historical events reenactment
- Marching band activities and musical training

The Central Band of Young Army Cadet Movement was established in 2014. Since December 2017, the team has been actively participating in the concert activities of the Consolidated Children and Youth Brass Bands of Moscow. According to Russian youth militarization scholar Ian Garner, the movement's activities have increasingly been focused on digital engagement, with social media, viral trends, and participation online being added to traditional elements.

=== Events ===
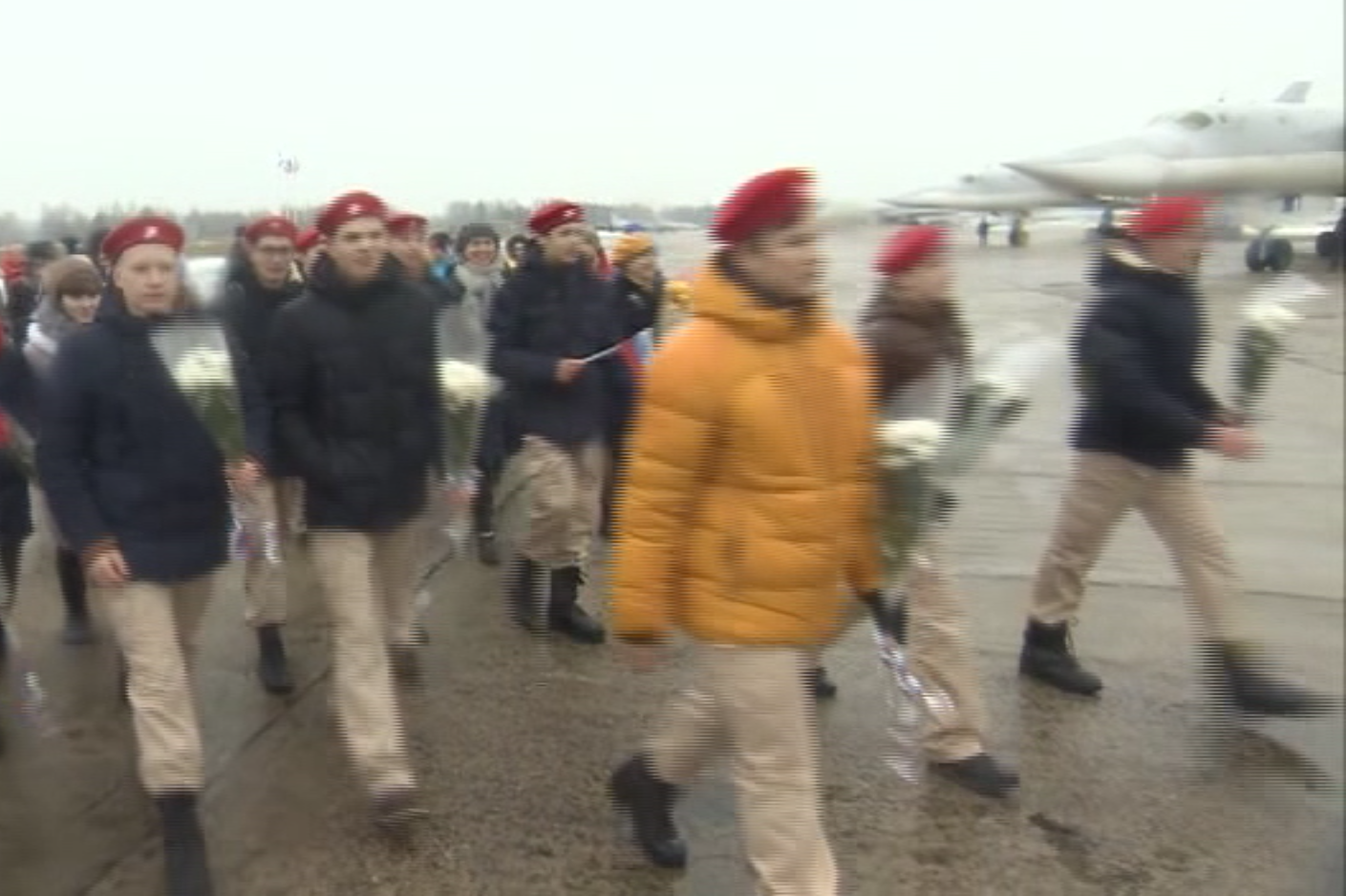
Representatives of Yunarmiya receiving Tu-22M3 crews returning to Shaykovka air base after their 2017 bombing campaign in the Syrian civil war

On 12 December 2017, a ceremony was held at Shaykovka air base near Kirov, Kaluga Oblast when a fleet of Tu-22M3 returned from the Russian intervention in the Syrian civil war and representatives of Yunarmiya were among those who received the returning crews from their bombing missions.

YAM participated in Russian International Army Games military competition event.

== See also ==
- Cadet Corps (Russia)
- Young Guard of United Russia
- Nashi (Russian youth movement)
