= Soviet destroyer Otvazhny (1964) =

Destroyer of the Soviet Navy

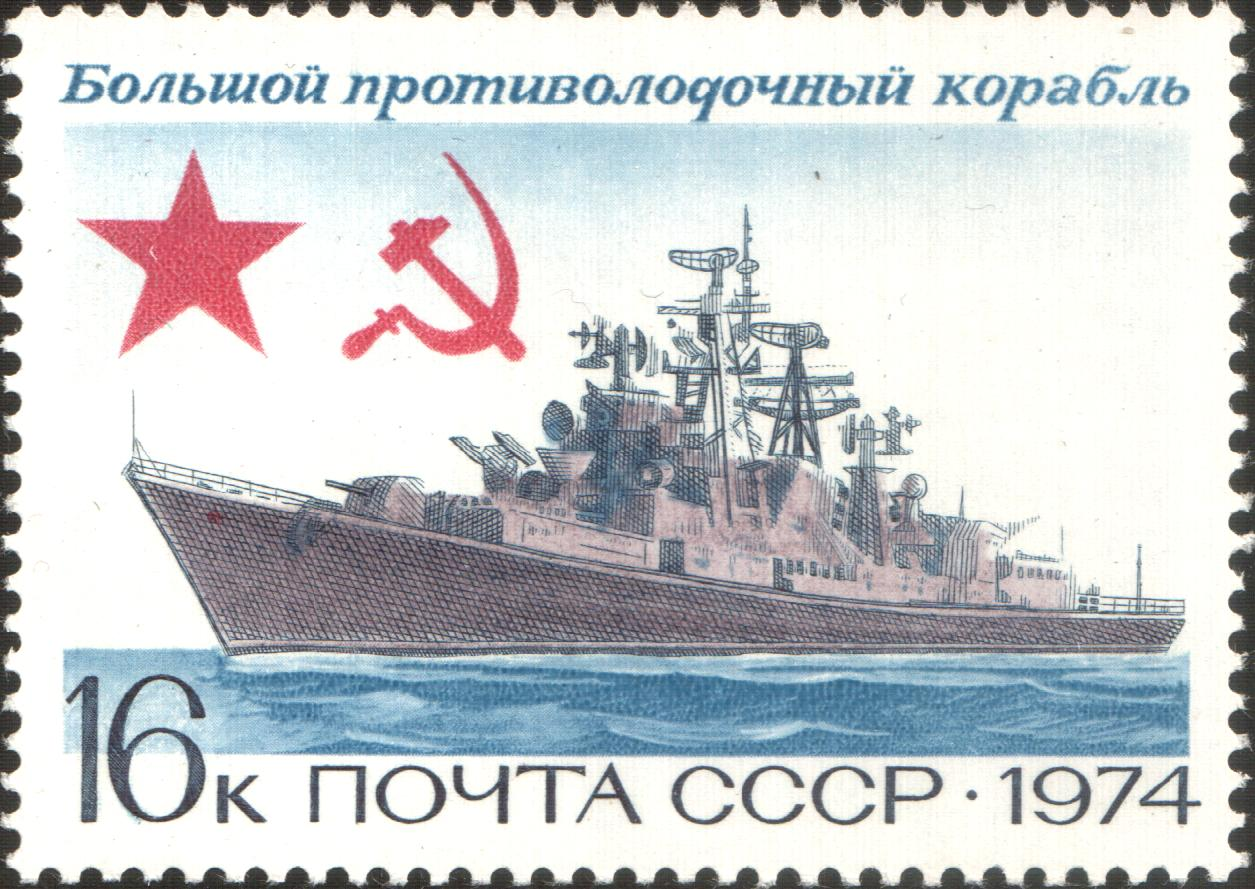
- Soviet stamp depicting Kashin-class destroyer

History

Soviet Union
- Name: Otvazhny
- Builder: 61 Communards Shipyard
- Laid down: 10 August 1963
- Launched: 17 October 1964
- Completed: 31 December 1965
- Fate: Sunk in an ammunition accident, 30 August 1974

General characteristics
- Class & type: Kashin-class destroyer
- Displacement: 4,290 t (4,220 long tons) (full load)
- Length: 144 m (472 ft 5 in) (o/a)
- Beam: 15.8 m (51 ft 10 in)
- Draft: 4.46 m (14 ft 8 in)
- Installed power: 72,000 shp (54,000 kW)
- Propulsion: 2 shafts; 2 gas turbiness
- Speed: 34 knots (63 km/h; 39 mph)
- Range: 3,500 nmi (6,500 km; 4,000 mi) at 18 knots (33 km/h; 21 mph)
- Complement: 266
- Armament: 2 × twin 76 mm (3 in) AK-726 guns; 2 × twin launchers for SA-N-1 'Goa' SAM (32 missiles); 1 × quintuple 533 mm (21 in) torpedo tubes; 2 × 12-barrel RBU-6000 ASW rocket launchers; 2 × 6-barrel RBU-1000 ASW rocket launchers

Otvazhny was a Soviet Kashin-class destroyer built for the Black Sea Fleet during the 1960s. She sank on 30 August 1974 after a defective anti-aircraft missile launched during Black Sea Fleet drills ignited a fire which resulted in the explosion of the ship's ammunition magazines.

== Service history ==
Otvazhny was laid down at the 61st Kommunara Shipbuilding Plant in August 1963, launched on 17 October 1964, and commissioned into the Soviet Navy on 31 December, 1965.

In 1967, during the Six-Day War, she carried out combat duties off Port Said in Egypt.

The ship was overhauled in the 61 Kommunara Shipbuilding Plant from 1968 to 1969. From 1972 to 1973, the ship underwent an eight-month period of repair in Sevastopol.

During the Yom Kippur War in 1973, Otvazhny escorted Soviet landing ships off the coast of Port Said.

Otvazhny participated in a friendly visit to Italian ports in October 1973 as part of a detachment of ships led by the cruiser Admiral Ushakov. From 15-18 October, she visited Taranto, and from 19-22 October she visited Messina.

From 10 November 1973 to 6 March 1974, the ship was deployed to the Mediterranean as part of the 70th Brigade of Anti-Submarine Ships.

On 28 July 1974, Otvazhny participated in Navy Day festivities in the city of Mykolaiv.

== Sinking ==
On 30 August 1974, Otvazhny, commanded by Captain 2nd Rank I. P. Vinnik, left Sevastopol to participate in exercises of the Black Sea Fleet. The Chief of Staff of the Black Sea Fleet, Kontr-Admiral Saakyan, was on board, as well as several other staff officers. The ship reached the designated area for the exercises at 9.55 and the captain signaled their readiness to begin exercises.

At around 10.00, the engine of one of the missiles in the aft M1 Volna (SA-N-1) missile complex spontaneously ignited. This started a fire, and shortly after led to the detonation of the warheads of the other missiles stored in the magazine.

Water entered the ship due to hull damage suffered in the explosion, and Otvazhny took on a 12° list to starboard. The fire could not be extinguished, and attempts to flood the ship’s magazines to prevent further detonations were unsuccessful.

Ships were immediately dispatched from Sevastopol to assist the damaged ship. The destroyer Soznatelny was the first to arrive and took Otvazhny in tow at around 10.50. The destroyers Bedovy, Komsomolets Ukrainy, as well as the rescue ship Beshtau, assisted in controlling the fire and evacuating wounded crew members.

At around 11.45, Soznatelny stopped towing Otvazhny. This has been reported as either due to the tow line snapping, or Soznatelny confusing orders and following a command intended for Bedovy. Bedovy then took Otvazhny under tow again at 12.49 pm. Otvazhny’s list to starboard continued to increase as water used to fight the fire accumulated in empty compartments.

At 14.47, a further ammunition explosion occurred in Otvazhny’s stern, causing her list to increase sharply to 27°. The ship lost all power, and the order to abandon ship was given at 15.10. Otvazhny began to sink by the stern, and at around 15.40 Bedovy stopped towing. Otvazhny finally sank at 15.57. Of the 287 crew on board at the time of the disaster, 24 were killed.

== Bibliography ==
- Gardiner, Robert, ed. (1995). Conway's All the World's Fighting Ships 1947–1995. London: Conway Maritime. ISBN 0-85177-605-1. OCLC 34284130. Also published as Gardiner, Robert; Chumbley, Stephen; Budzbon, Przemysław, eds. (1995). Conway's All the World's Fighting Ships 1947–1995. Annapolis, MD: Naval Institute Press. ISBN 1-55750-132-7. OCLC 34267261.
- Kostrichenko, V. V; Prostokishin, A. A (1999). "«Поющие фрегаты». Большие противолодочные корабли проекта 61" [“Singing Frigates”. Large anti-submarine ships of Project 61]. Морская коллекция (in Russian). Moscow: Моделист- Конструктор.
- Karzhavin, Boris A. (1994). Гибель «Отважного» [The Death of “Otvazhny”] (in Russian). St Petersburg: Корвет. ISBN 5-88100-005-6.
- INRO Staff (1992). "The Loss of the Project 61 Class Antisubmarine Warfare Ship Otvazhnyi". Warship International. XXIX (3): 256–266. ISSN 0043-0374.
- Pavlov, A. S. (1997). Warships of the USSR and Russia, 1945-1995. Annapolis, Maryland: Naval Institute Press. ISBN 1-55750-671-X.
