= Soviet destroyer Neuderzhimy =

Kildin-class destroyer

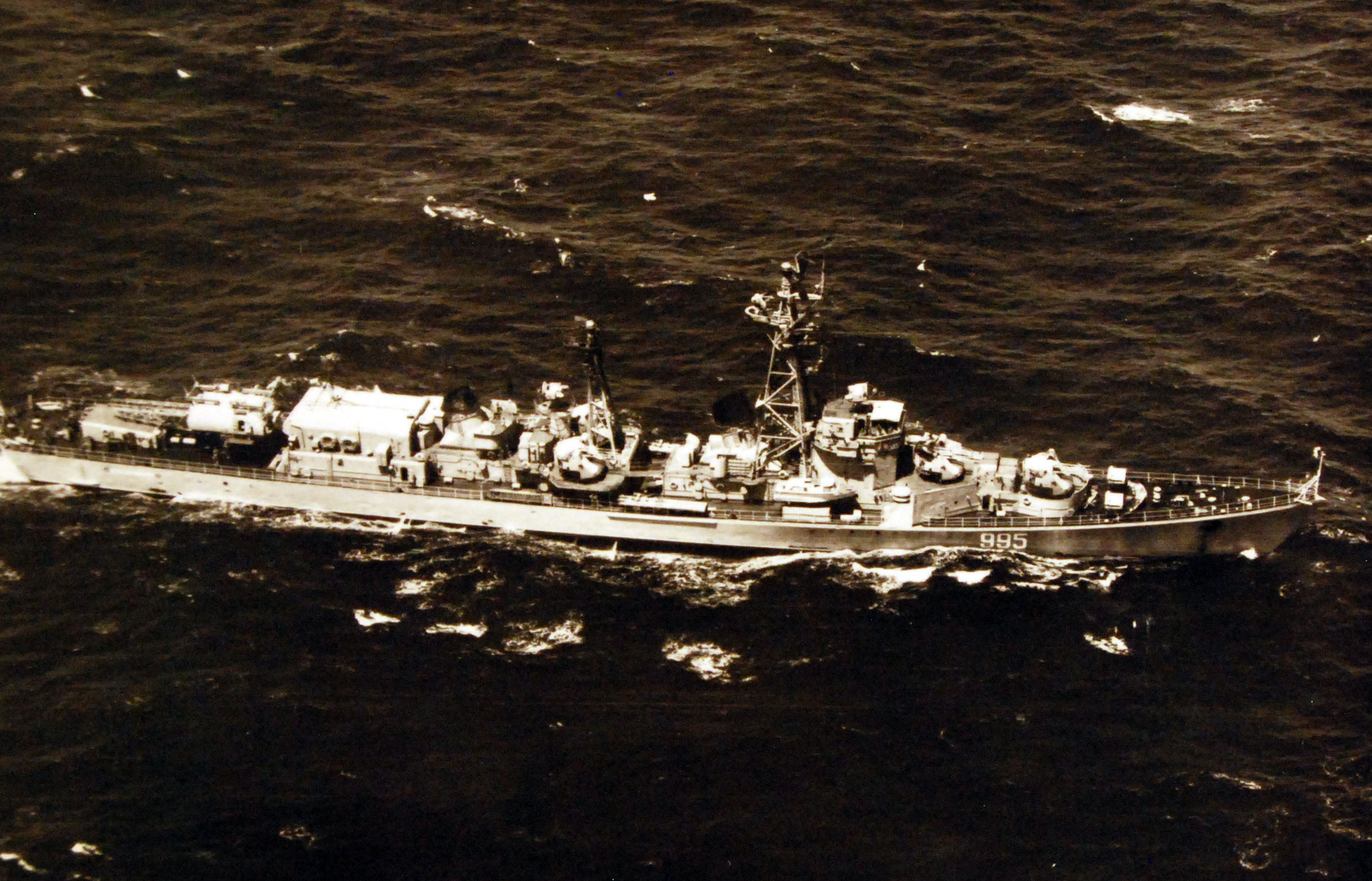
- Neuderzhimy in March 1975

History

Soviet Union
- Name: Neuderzhimy; (Неудержимый)
- Namesake: Unrestrainable in Russian
- Ordered: 19 January 1955
- Builder: Amur Shipbuilding Plant
- Laid down: 23 February 1957
- Launched: 24 May 1958
- Commissioned: 30 December 1958
- Decommissioned: 10 April 1987
- Renamed: TCB-567
- Fate: Sunk in 1992

General characteristics
- Class & type: Kildin-class destroyer
- Displacement: 2,662 long tons (2,705 t) standard; 3,230 long tons (3,282 t) full load
- Length: 126.1 m (414 ft)
- Beam: 12.7 m (42 ft)
- Draught: 4.2 m (14 ft)
- Installed power: 72,000 hp (54,000 kW)
- Propulsion: 2 × shaft geared steam turbines; 4 × boilers
- Speed: 38 kn (70 km/h; 44 mph)
- Complement: 273
- Sensors & processing systems: Radar: Fut -N air-search radar; Ryf surface-search radar; Sonar: Pegas
- Armament: as designed: 1 × SS-N-1 anti shipping missile launcher; (8 re-load missiles); 4 × quad 57 mm guns; 2 × dual 533 mm torpedo tubes; 2 × RBU-2500 w/ 128 RGB-25; 2 × RPK-8 Zapad/RBU-6000 12 tubed mortar launchers

Neuderzhimy was the fourth ship of the Kildin-class destroyer of the Soviet Navy.

== Construction and career ==
The ship was built at Amur Shipbuilding Plant in Komsomolsk-on-Amur and was launched on 31 July 1955 and commissioned into the Pacific Fleet on 30 June 1958.

On May 19, 1966, the ship was reclassified into a Large Missile Ship (BRK), on March 3, 1977 - into a Large Anti-Submarine Ship (BOD).

During the events following the incident with the seizure of the USS Pueblo on January 23, 1968, the ship was in the operational squadron. The squadron (under the command of Rear Admiral Nikolai Ivanovich Khovrin as part of the RRC of the Varyag, Admiral Fokin, Uporny, Neuderzhimy, Vyzyvayushchy and Vesky) The task was set to patrol the area in readiness to protect the state interests of the USSR from provocative actions.

On July 23, 1979, she was delivered for overhaul at Dalzavod, Vladivostok, but on December 8, 1985 it was disarmed and reorganized into a training ship (TCB), and on March 14, 1986, she was renamed into TCB- 567.

In 1992, she was sunk in Truda Bay, Russky Island.
