= Kildin-class destroyer =

Soviet destroyers built 1953–1958

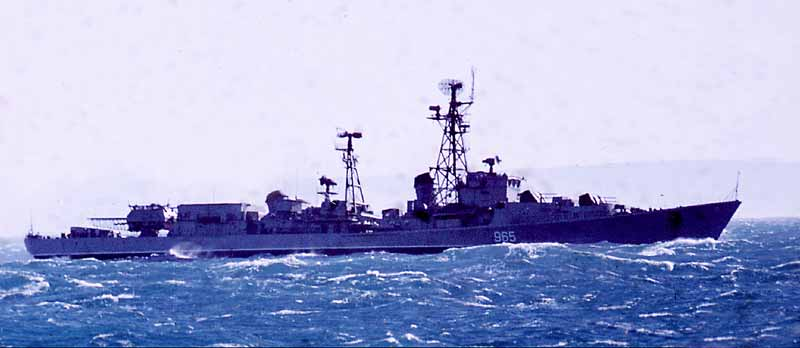
- Kildin-class destroyer with SS-N-1 launcher

Class overview
- Name: Kildin class
- Builders: Shipyard No.445 (61 Kommunar) (2); Shipyard No.190 (Zhdanov) (1); Shipyard No.199, Komsomolsk-on-Amur (1)
- Operators: Soviet Navy
- Preceded by: Kotlin class
- Succeeded by: Kanin class
- Built: 1953–1958
- In commission: 1958–1991
- Planned: 5
- Completed: 4
- Canceled: 1
- Retired: 4

General characteristics
- Type: Guided missile destroyer
- Displacement: 2662 tons standard, 3230 tons full load
- Length: 126.1 m (414 ft)
- Beam: 12.7 m (42 ft)
- Draught: 4.2 m (14 ft)
- Installed power: 72,000 hp (54,000 kW)
- Propulsion: 2 × shaft geared steam turbines, 4 boilers,
- Speed: 38 kn (70 km/h; 44 mph)
- Complement: 273
- Sensors & processing systems: Radar: Fut -N (air search), Ryf (surface); Sonar: Pegas
- Armament: (as designed); 1 SS-N-1 anti shipping missile launcher (8 re-load missiles); 16 × 57 mm guns (4x4), 4 × 533 mm torpedo tubes (2x2), 2 × RBU-2500 w/ 128 RGB-25, 2 × RPK-8 Zapad/RBU-6000 12 tubed mortar launchers; (as modernised); 4 SS-N-2 anti shipping missile launchers; 4 × 76mm guns (2 twin turrets); 16 × 57 mm guns (4x4), 4 × 533 mm torpedo tubes (2x2), 2 × RBU-2500 w/ 128 RGB-25, 2 × RPK-8 Zapad/RBU-6000 12 tubed mortar launchers

The Kildin-class destroyer was a series of destroyers built for the Soviet Navy in the 1950s. They were a missile armed version of the Kotlin-class destroyer, and the class was named for Kildin Island. Four ships were built around the KSShch (КСЩ, SS-N-1) anti-ship missile. When this missile became obsolete in the 1960s, three ships were modernised in 1972-1977. All ships were decommissioned in the late 1980s early 1990s. The Soviet designation was Project 56EM for the prototype (Bedovy), Project 56M for three series ships, and Project 56U for the modernised ships.

== Design ==
The Kotlin-class hull and machinery were retained, A rail SSM launcher was fitted at the stern and the forward 130mm gun was replaced by two quad 57mm anti aircraft guns (45mm in Bedovy). The torpedo tubes were replaced by twin 533mm tubes located on the beam. After the SS-N-1 missile was declared to be obsolete the Soviets replaced these missiles with two 76mm gun turrets aft and four SS-N-2 missile launchers.

== Ships ==
- Bedovy (Бедовый - Mischievous) - built by Zhdanov Shipyard, Leningrad, completed 1958, scrapped 1989
- Neulovimy (Неуловимый - Elusive) - built by Zhdanov Shipyard, Leningrad, completed 1958, scrapped 1990
- Prozorlivy (Прозорливый - Perceptive ) - built in Nikolayev, completed 1958, scrapped 1991
- Neuderzhimy (Неудержимый - Unrestrainable) - built in Komsomolsk na Amure, completed 1958, scrapped 1985 (not modernised)
- Neukrotimy (Неукротимый - Indomitable) - cancelled before construction starts

== See also ==
- List of ships of the Soviet Navy
- List of ships of Russia by project number
