= Voin (organization) =

Russian youth military training organization

- Center for Military-Sports Training and Patriotic Upbringing of the Youth "Voin"
- Центр военно-спортивной подготовки и патриотического воспитания молодежи «Воин»
- Formation: 2023; 3 years ago
- Founder: Sergei Avakyants
- Headquarters: Moscow, Russia
- Official language: Russian

The Center for Military-Sports Training and Patriotic Upbringing of the Youth "Voin" (Note: "Воин" means "warrior" in Russian) (Russian: Центр военно-спортивной подготовки и патриотического воспитания молодежи «Воин») is a military training organization in Russia. It was established in 2023, headed by Sergei Avakyants, citing the organizational drawbacks of DOSAAF, which turned out to be incapable to provide initial military training of the youth. Initially the branches of Voin were established in 12 regions of Russia (including all illegally occupied regions in Ukraine)

Avakyants was given this post after he was dismissed from his position as commander of the Pacific Fleet.

In March 2024, Voin announced it was planning to launch experimental military training of five-graders.

In February 2025, Voin announced via Tass that it signed agreements with all universities in Luhansk People's Republic. The program teaches students applied military skills: undergo firearms, engineering, and tactical training, learn to operate UAVs, and provide first aid.
