= Soviet destroyer Prozorlivy =

Kildin-class destroyer

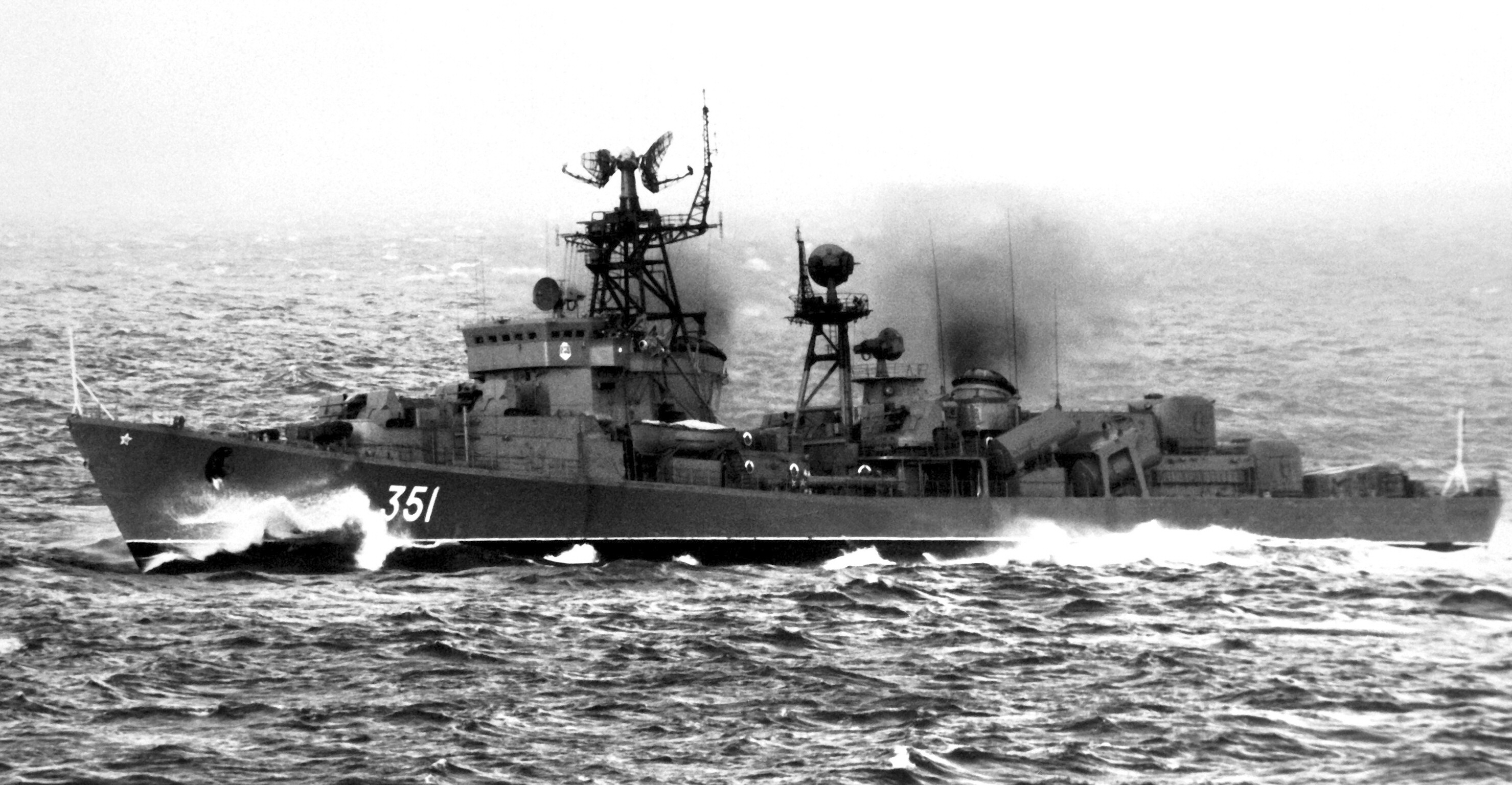
- Prozorlivy in 1982

History

Soviet Union
- Name: Prozorlivy; (Прозорливый)
- Namesake: Perceptive in Russian
- Ordered: 17 October 1955
- Builder: Black Sea Shipyard
- Laid down: 1 September 1956
- Launched: 30 July 1957
- Commissioned: 30 December 1958
- Decommissioned: 24 June 1991
- Fate: Scrapped, 1991

General characteristics
- Class & type: Kildin-class destroyer
- Displacement: 2,662 long tons (2,705 t) standard; 3,230 long tons (3,282 t) full load
- Length: 126.1 m (414 ft)
- Beam: 12.7 m (42 ft)
- Draught: 4.2 m (14 ft)
- Installed power: 72,000 hp (54,000 kW)
- Propulsion: 2 × shaft geared steam turbines; 4 × boilers
- Speed: 38 kn (70 km/h; 44 mph)
- Complement: 273
- Sensors & processing systems: Radar: Fut -N air-search radar; Ryf surface-search radar; Sonar: Pegas
- Armament: as designed: 1 × SS-N-1 anti shipping missile launcher; (8 re-load missiles); 4 × quad 57 mm guns; 2 × dual 533 mm torpedo tubes; 2 × RBU-2500 w/ 128 RGB-25; 2 × RPK-8 Zapad/RBU-6000 12 tubed mortar launchers; as modernised: 4 × SS-N-2 anti shipping missile launchers; 2 × dual 76mm guns; 4 × quad 57 mm guns; 2 × dual 533 mm torpedo tubes; 2 × RBU-2500 w/ 128 RGB-25, 2 × RPK-8 Zapad/RBU-6000 12 tubed mortar launchers

Prozorlivy was the third ship of the Kildin-class destroyer of the Soviet Navy.

== Construction and career ==
The ship was built at Zhdanov Shipyard in Leningrad and was launched on 31 July 1955 and commissioned into the Pacific Fleet on 30 June 1958.

On December 30, 1958, she entered service, and on March 8, 1960 was included in the Red Banner Black Sea Fleet (KChF).

On May 19, 1966, she was reclassified into a Large Missile Ship (DBK), on February 1, 1977 - into a Large Anti-Submarine Ship (BOD), and on August 3, 1977, it was again returned to the DBK.

In 1976-1977, the ship was modernized at the Sevmorzavod, Sevastopol according to the project 56-U.

From October 1977 to May 1978, she was in combat service in the Angola region, calling at the port of Luanda. On August 25, 1978, she was assigned to the Baltic Fleet (KBF).

In June 1979, the ship paid a visit to Helsinki, Finland, and in the fall, from September 1979 to July 1980, she repeatedly carried out combat missions to assist the armed forces of Angola. July 1981 - participation in joint exercises of the socialist fleets to increase combat readiness.

The first days of November 1981 - participation in the liberation of the submarine S-363 from the Swedish naval base Karlskrona.

On June 24, 1991, she was withdrawn from the Navy in connection with the transfer to the OFI for dismantling and sale, disbanded on October 1, 1991.
