= Otvazhnoye =

Otvazhnoye Отважное
- Selo
- Location within Amur Oblast Location within Russia
- Coordinates: 49°21′N 130°06′E
- Country: Russia
- Region: Amur Oblast
- District: Arkharinsky District
- Time zone: UTC+9:00

Otvazhnoye (Russian: Отважное) is a rural locality (a selo) and the administrative center of Otvazhnensky Selsoviet of Arkharinsky District, Amur Oblast, Russia. The population was 667 as of 2018. There are 14 streets.

== Geography ==
Otvazhnoye is located on the left bank of the Arkhara River, 12 km south of Arkhara (the district's administrative centre) by road. Tatakan is the nearest rural locality.
