= Soviet destroyer Komsomolets Ukrainy =

Kashin-class destroyer of the Soviet Navy

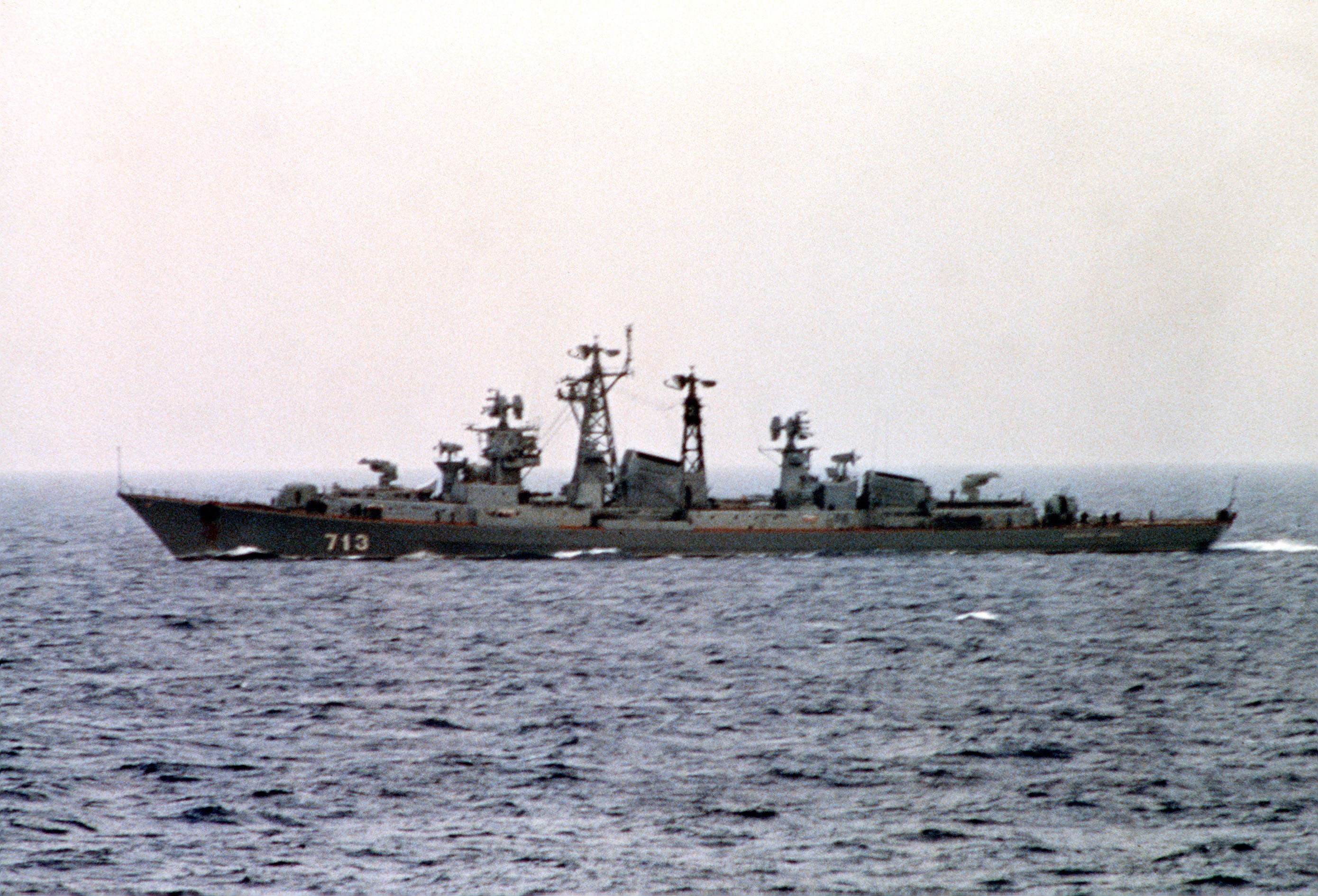
- Komsomolets Ukrainy in 1990

History

Soviet Union
- Name: Komsomolets Ukrainy; (Комсомолец Украины)
- Namesake: Komsomol of Ukraine
- Builder: 61 Communards Shipyard, Nikolayev
- Laid down: 15 September 1959
- Launched: 31 December 1960
- Commissioned: 31 December 1962
- Decommissioned: 24 June 1991
- Renamed: from SKR-25
- Home port: Sevastopol
- Identification: Pennant number: 703, 713, 716
- Fate: Scrapped, 1995

General characteristics
- Class & type: Kashin-class destroyer
- Displacement: 3,400 tons standard, 4,390 tons full load
- Length: 144 m (472 ft)
- Beam: 15.8 m (52 ft)
- Draught: 4.6 m (15 ft)
- Propulsion: 2 × COGAG; 2 shafts, 4 × M8E gas turbines M3 unit aggregate; 72,000 hp (54,000 kW) up to 96,000 hp (72,000 kW)
- Speed: 38 kn (70 km/h; 44 mph) (4 gas turbines on full power)
- Range: 3,500 nmi (6,480 km; 4,030 mi) at 18 kn (33 km/h; 21 mph)
- Complement: 266 to 320
- Armament: 2 × twin 76 mm (3 in) AK-726 guns; 2 × twin SA-N-1 'Goa' surface-to-air missile launchers (32 missiles); 1 × 5 533 mm (21 in) torpedo tubes; 2 × 12 RBU-6000 anti-submarine rocket launchers; 2 × 6 RBU-1000 anti-submarine rocket launchers
- Aircraft carried: 1 x Ka-27 series helicopter
- Aviation facilities: Helipad

Komsomolets Ukrainy was the lead ship of Kashin-class destroyer of the Soviet Navy.

== Development and design ==
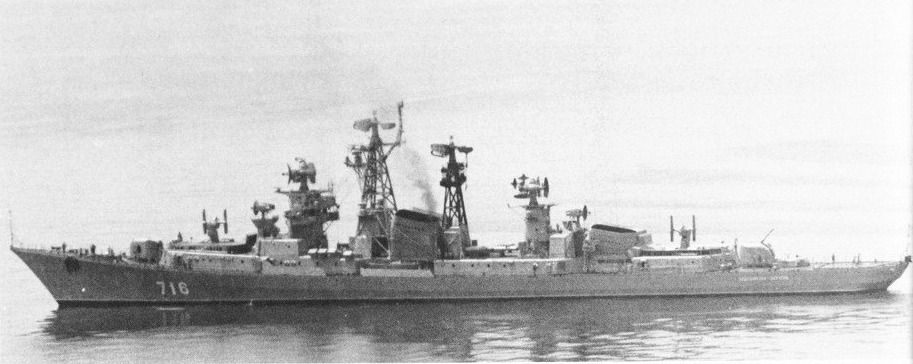
Komsomolets Ukrainy underway in 1983

Late 1950s and 1960s – this is an era of great changes in the history of the navy, an era of new opportunities and new weapons. This was primarily due to the emergence of sea-based nuclear missiles, which turned submarines into strategic weapons. The appearance of nuclear power plants on submarines has greatly increased their autonomy, cruising range, underwater speed and, as a consequence, the severity of the threat they create.

From the very beginning, two options for the main power plant were considered – a traditional steam turbine (STU) and a gas turbine (GTU). The latter, due to its lightness and compactness (specific gravity 5.2 kg / l. From. Versus 9 kg / l. From.), Reduced the ship's displacement from 3600 to 3200 tons and increased efficiency. In addition, starting from a cold state took 5–10 minutes for the GTU compared to the several hours required for the STU. For these reasons, the option with gas turbine engines was adopted.

The armament of the new ship was innovative. For the first time in Soviet shipbuilding, it was equipped with two anti-aircraft missile systems (M-1 "Volna"). Each complex consisted of a two-boom launcher ZIF-101, a Yatagan control system and a magazine with two rotating drums for 8 V-600 missiles each.

== Construction and career ==
Komsomolets Ukrainy was laid down on 15 September 1959, and launched on 31 December 1960 by Mykolayiv Shipyard in Mykolayiv. She was commissioned on 31 December 1962. On February 19, 1966, she was awarded the USSR Navy Prize and a diploma of the Commander-in-Chief of the USSR Navy. From June 5 to June 30, 1967, the ship performed combat missions to assist the armed forces of Egypt (during the Arab-Israeli conflict), as part of the 5th Squadron of the USSR Navy. From April to May 1970, Komsomolets Ukrainy participated in the maneuvers paid an official visit to Algeria from May 8 to 13. On August 30, 1974, during an explosion and fire at the Otvazhny shipyard, the sailors of Komsomolets Ukrainy provided assistance, and later took part in the investigation of the incident.

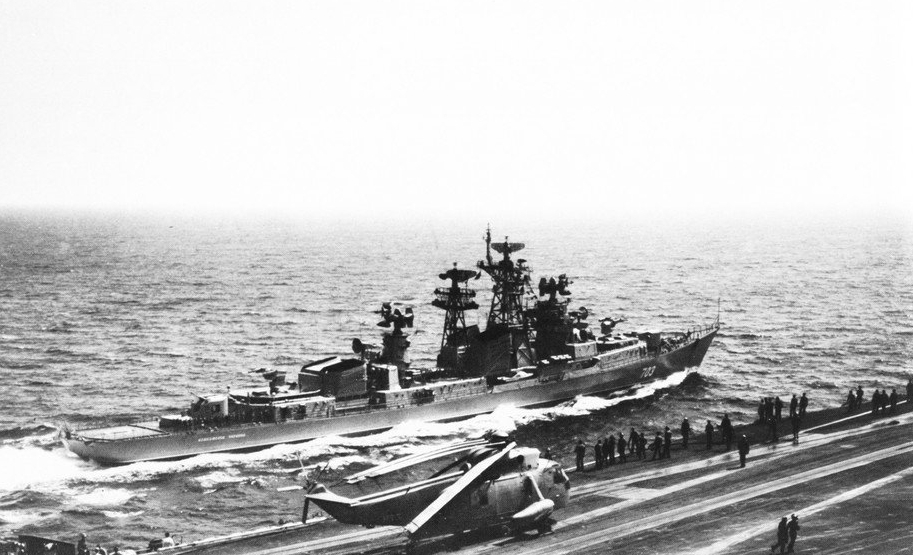
Komsomolets Ukrainy alongside USS Dwight D. Eisenhower underway in 1988

Komsomolets Ukrainy was dry-docked an extensive overhaul that lasted from 23 May 1977, to August 7, 1979; the work took place at the 61 Kommunar plant in Nikolaev. In May 1980, the ship underwent periodic maintenance in the port of Varna, Bulgaria. In the early 1980s, she embarked on a pair of cruises into the Mediterranean Sea, the first from 22 May to 14 July 1981, and the second from 21 August to 1 March 1982. In December 1981, she made a visit to the port of Split, Yugoslavia. From 16 June to 1 July 1982, the ship participated in the Shield-82 exercises, after which she made a call at the ports of Burgas and Varna. Later that year, she went to Tuapse for periodic maintenance. She again went into the Mediterranean from 26 October to 1 July 1983, which included a visit to the port of Tartus, Syria. Komsomolets Ukrainy embarked on another Mediterranean cruise from 25 February to 27 July 1984, during which she visited the port of Dubrovnik. During the two cruises in 1983 and 1984, she performed the tasks of a radar picket ship in the combat zone during the war in Lebanon.

In 1985, she took part in the exercises Granit-85. From 12 to 27 June 1986, Komsomolets Ukrainy participated in the exercises of the joint squadron followed by a call at the ports of Sozopol and Burgas. The ship visited Yugoslavia in October and then Piraeus, Greece, from 18 to 22 November. On a cruise in the Mediterranean in 1987, she visited Tunisia, Algeria, from 17 to 21 November. During combat service in April 1988, the ship performed air defense missions in Tripoli, Libya. The ship visited Algeria from 28 to 30 May 1988. She visited Istanbul, Turkey, from 28 June to 2 July 1989. On 24 June 1991, Komsomolets Ukrainy was removed from the fleet, disarmed, and transferred to the stock property department for dismantling and sale. The ship entered Inkerman for scrapping on 3 May 1995.
