= ORP Rolnik =

Tarantul I-class corvette

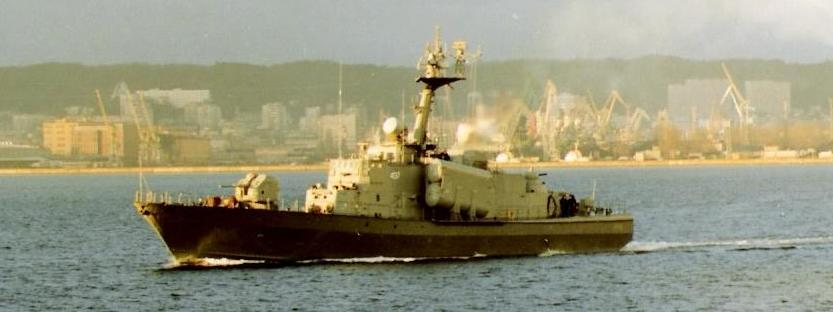
- ORP Rolnik underway off Gdynia

History

Soviet Union
- Name: R-833; (Р-833)
- Fate: Transferred to Poland, 1989

Poland
- Name: Rolnik
- Namesake: Rolnik
- Commissioned: 4 February 1989
- Decommissioned: 3 December 2013
- Identification: MMSI number: 261236000; Callsign: SNWF; Pennant number: 437
- Fate: Scrapped, 2020

General characteristics
- Class & type: Tarantul I-class corvette
- Displacement: 385 t (379 long tons), standard; 455 t (448 long tons), full load
- Length: 56.1 m (184 ft 1 in)
- Beam: 10.2 m (33 ft 6 in)
- Draft: 2.2 m (7 ft 3 in)
- Installed power: 17,000 hp (12,677 kW)
- Propulsion: 2 × M-15E gas turbines; 2 × propellers; 2 × DGR2A-200/1500 diesel generators; 1 × DGR2A-100/1500 diesel generator
- Speed: 43 knots (80 km/h; 49 mph)
- Range: 2,200 nmi (4,100 km; 2,500 mi) at 14 knots (26 km/h; 16 mph)
- Endurance: 10 days
- Complement: 37 crew
- Sensors & processing systems: Garpun-E FCS; Pechora-1 navigation radar (Poland); Nikhrom-RR IFF; MR-123 Vympel-A FCS
- Armament: 1 × single AK-176M gun; 2 × sextuple AK-630M CIWS; 2 × twin KT-138E launchers; P-20M anti-ship missiles; 9K32M Strela-2M SAM; 9K34 Strela-3 SAM; 9K34 Strela-3M SAM (Poland)

ORP Rolnik (Polish: farmer) was a Polish Navy missile Tarantul-class corvette. Built in Rybinsk for the Soviet Navy as R-833, the ship was acquired by Poland in 1989 and served until 2013.

== Description ==
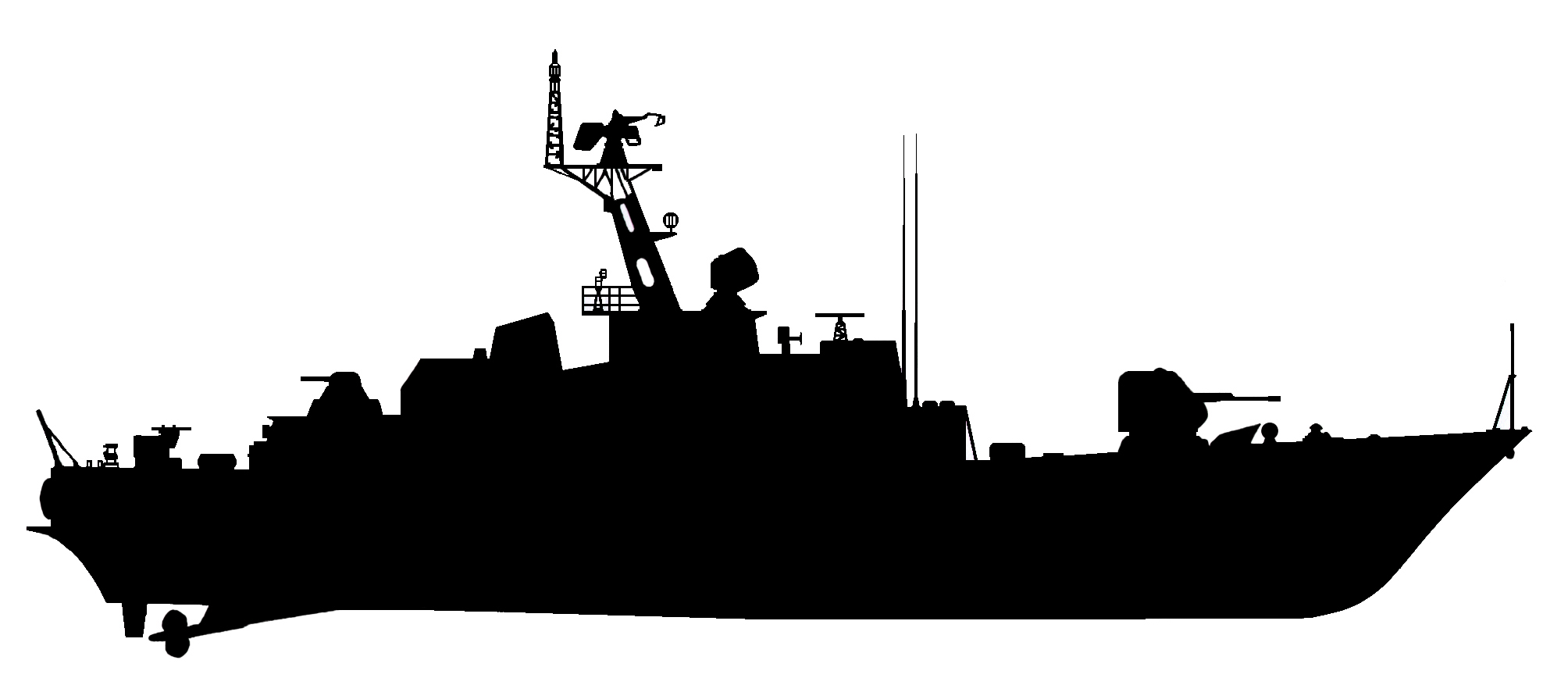
Silhouette of ORP Rolnik

Internationally, the ship was classified as a small corvette, while in Poland it was referred to as a missile ship. It was powered by two gas turbines with a maximum horsepower of 12,000 HP, allowing it to reach speeds of over 43 knots. Rolnik's primary armament was for ship-to-ship combat, and its primary weapon was the P-21/P-22 anti-ship missile. The ship lacked airborne detection radar, and had minimal anti-aircraft capabilities. It had a crew of 45 officers and sailors.

=== Radar equipment ===
- Garpun-E target acquisition radar (NATO: "Plank Shave")
- MR-123 fire control radar (NATO: "Bass Tilt")
- Pechora-1 navigational radar

=== Armament ===
- Nichrom-RR recognition system
- P-21/P-22 anti-ship missiles

== History ==
The success of the Osa-class missile boats caused the Soviet Union to begin looking for a successor class to replace the aging ships. Development of the Tarantul I-class corvettes began in 1965, with an assumption that the new ships would be 400-500 tons and carry a new missile system. After planning was completed by CKMB Almaz, construction began on Rolnik in 1969. The ship was built in the Rybinsk Shipyard under the yard number 01722 and the designation R-833.

After several decades of service within the Soviet Navy, the boat was purchased by Poland in 1989. Upon commissioning into the Polish Navy on 4 February 1989, Rolnik was assigned to a new independent group of missile ships. Later, the ship was reassigned to the 2nd Missile and Torpedo Boat Squadron of the 3rd Ship Flotilla. In 2004, the ship was moved to the Missile Ships Squadron, and then to its final assignment in the Battle Ships Squadron.

From 1989 to 2009, Rolnik launched thirty-two rockets and travelled a total of fifty thousand miles. It participated in several international exercises in the Baltic Sea, including BALTOPS and PASSEX. The ship was decommissioned at the Naval Port in Gdynia on 3 December 2013.

In April of 2020 the ship was scrapped at the Vistal shipyard in Gdynia.
