= Chinese cutter Nansha =

Chinese Coast Guard vessel

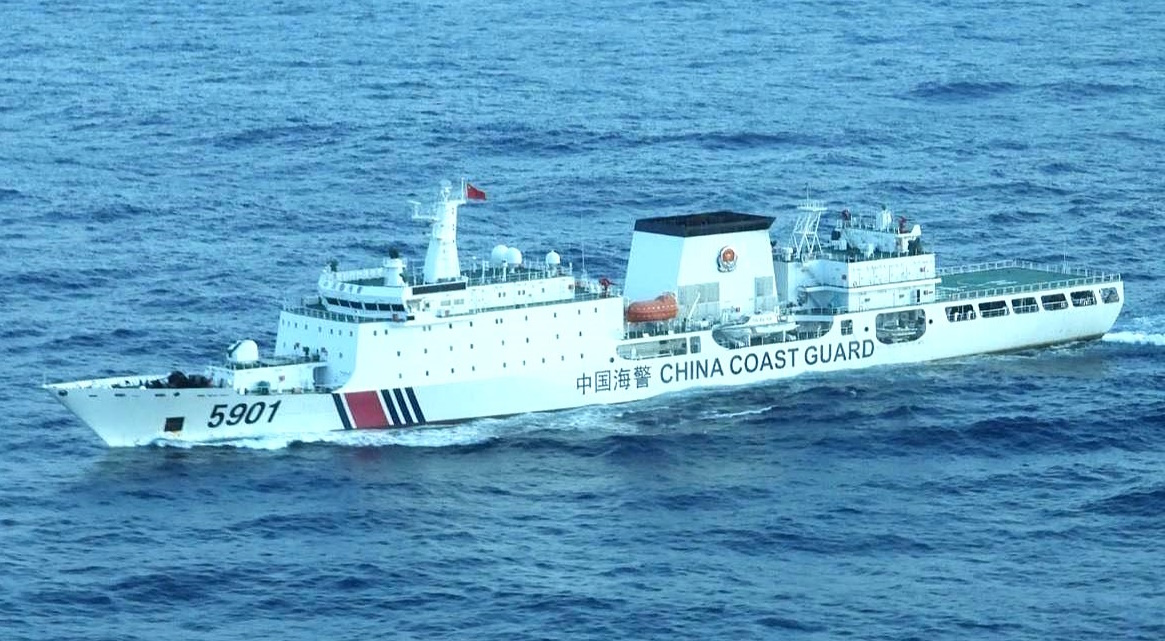
- Nansha off Luzon in 2025

History

China
- Name: Nansha (南沙)
- Namesake: Nansha Islands
- Launched: January 2016
- Commissioned: 2017
- Identification: IMO number: 9756028; MMSI number: 413482360; Callsign: BYKI; Hull number: 5901

General characteristics
- Class & type: Zhaotou-class cutter
- Displacement: 12,000 tons
- Length: 164.89 m (541 ft 0 in)
- Speed: 25 knots (46 km/h)
- Armament: 1x H/PJ-26; 2x 30mm cannons; 2x Heavy machine guns
- Aircraft carried: 2x Z-8
- Aviation facilities: Hangar and flight deck

Nansha (5901) (Chinese: 南沙舰), more commonly known as CCG-5901 or Haijing 5901 (Chinese: 海警5901; lit. 'Coast Guard 5901') due to its hull number or Haijing 3901 from its previous hull number, is a Zhaotou class cutter of the China Coast Guard. The ship has been referred to as the "monster" due to its size relative to other coast guard vessels.

== Design ==
Nansha is 164.89 metres (541 ft 0 in) long with a displacement of 12,000 tons, more than double that of the United States Coast Guard's National Security Cutters. She is also larger than every coast guard ship (with a notable exception being the United States' icebreakers) and outsizes most United States Navy destroyers (e.g. Arleigh Burke-class ships displace 9,700 tons or less and are 10.66 metres (35.0 ft) shorter). Her size led to the ship being given the moniker "The Monster", which the National Institute for South China Sea Studies of China noted to be a term used by Philippine-based media outlets.

The Nansha is armed with an H/PJ-26 76 mm naval gun, two 30 mm auxiliary guns, and two anti-aircraft machine guns. The ships can travel at a top speed of 25 knots (46 km/h; 29 mph) and a range of over 10,000 nautical miles (19,000 km; 12,000 mi). The estimated range is believed to be 15,000 nautical miles (28,000 km; 17,000 mi). Each vessel can carry two Z-8 helicopters and several boats. The Zhaotou class possess a large helicopter platform and hangar to accommodate large Z-8 helicopters. The vessel is speculated to be powered by MAN high-power diesel engines.

Nansha is a member of the Zhaotou class cutters.

== Deployment ==
Nansha was launched in January 2016 and commissioned in 2017.

In May 2017, the Nansha completed its first patrol in the South China Sea. The vessel spent 19 days patrolling and visiting in and around Chinese-held islands in the sea.

Nansha is usually deployed in the South China Sea to enforce China's sovereignty claims over the disputed sea and its islands. The vessel has been deployed near the Scarborough Shoal and the Second Thomas Shoal as well as the Philippines-controlled Thitu Island.

From December 2022 to January 2023, Nansha has been staying in parts of the sea renamed by Indonesia as North Natuna Sea. The area is claimed by Indonesia as part of its exclusive economic zone (EEZ).

China has claimed that its operations in the disputed sea is part of its legitimate law enforcement operations. The Philippines, another claimant country, claims that Nansha is engaging in intimidation and her presence is a violation of its own EEZ.
