= H/PJ-26 76 mm naval gun =

H/PJ-26
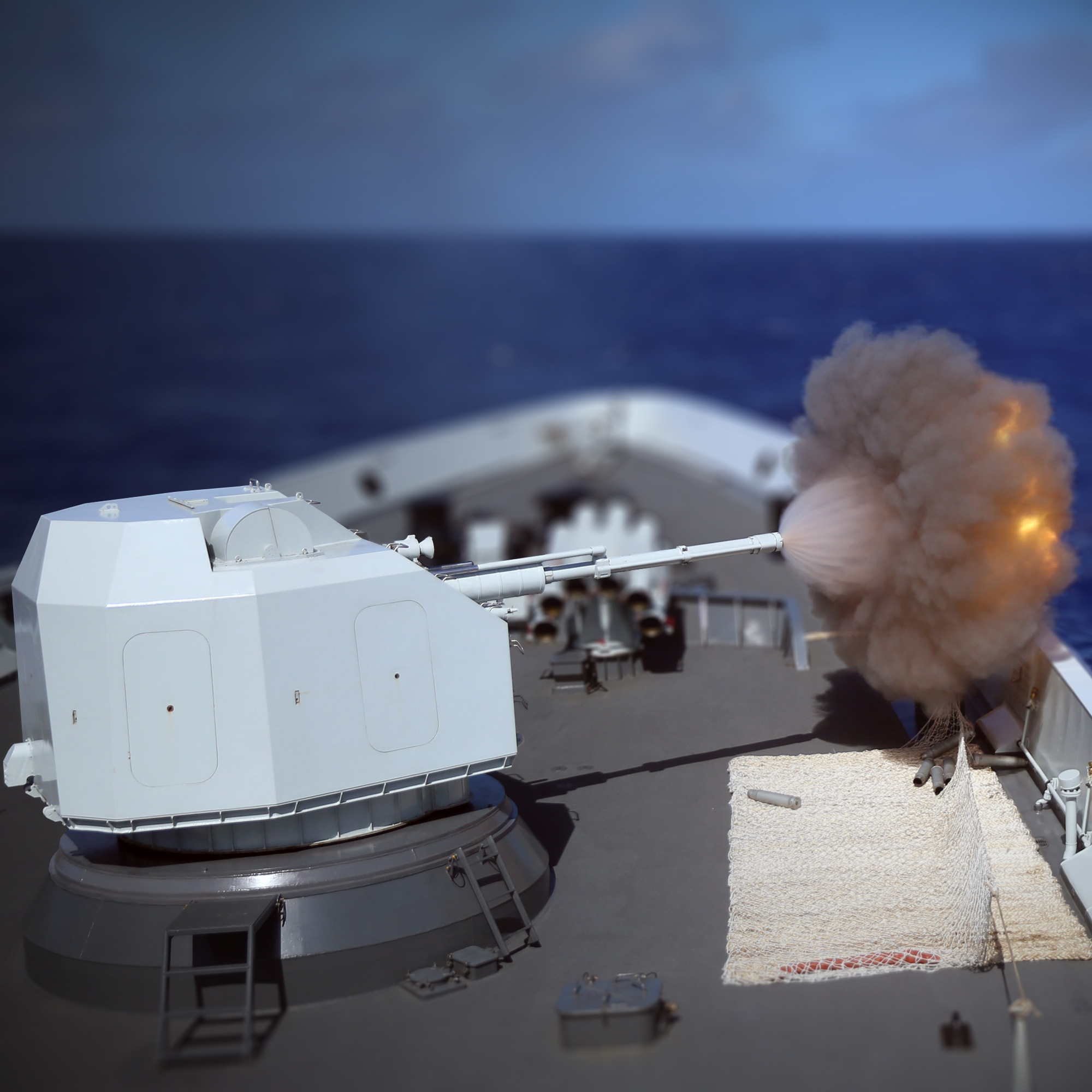
- Chinese frigate Hengshui fires its main gun H/PJ-26 during a gunnery exercise during RIMPAC 2016
- Type: Naval gun
- Place of origin: China

Service history
- Used by: See Operators

Production history
- Manufacturer: Zhengzhou Electrical Engineering

Specifications
- Crew: None on mount
- Caliber: 76 mm
- Barrels: Single barrel
- Feed system: 150 rounds

The H/PJ-26 is a naval gun developed by China. It is a development of the Soviet AK-176M.

== Design ==
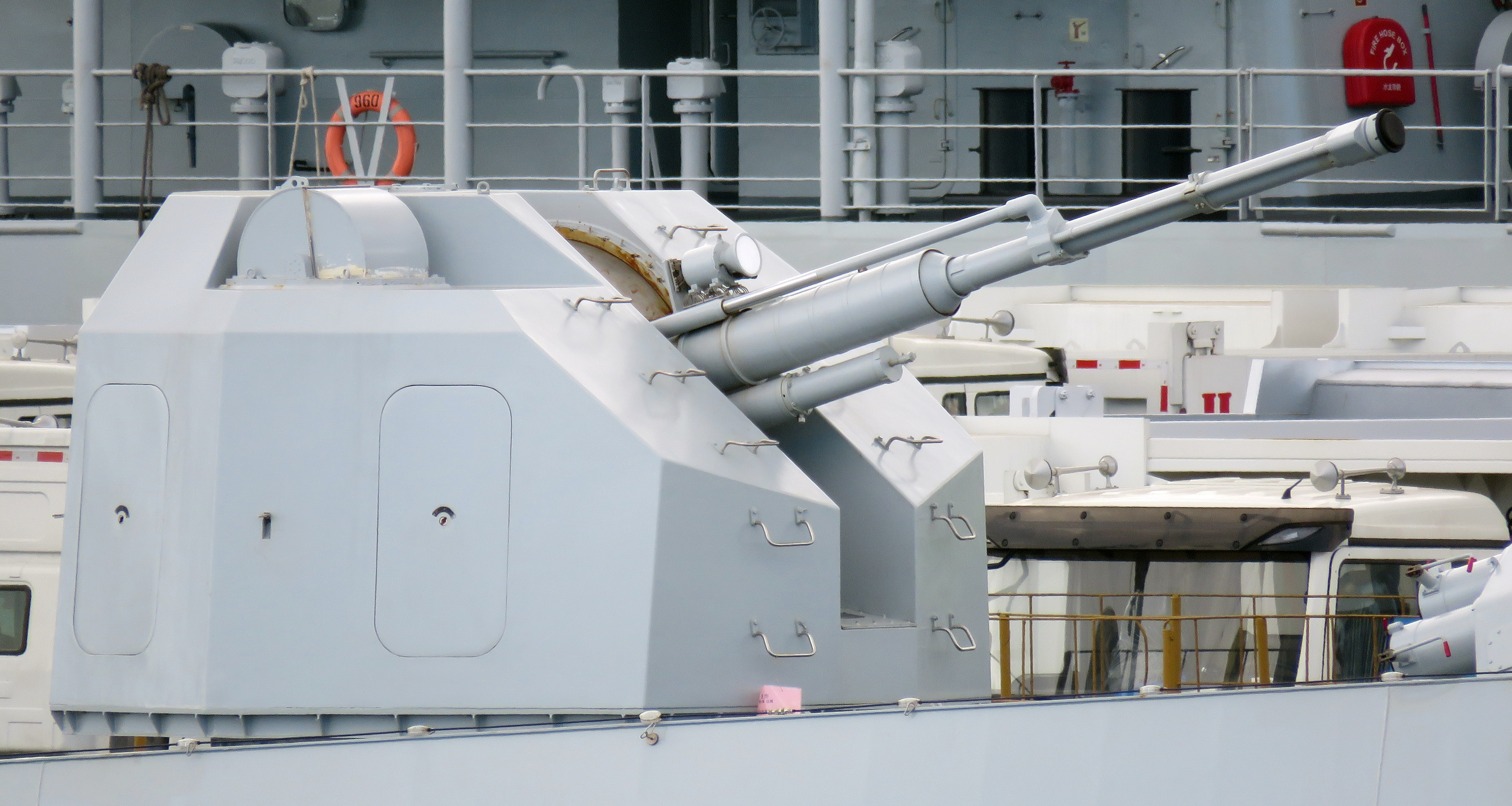
The H/PJ-26 gun mount on Type 054A class Chinese frigate Handan

The H/PJ-26 uses the same gun, ammunition and loading system as the AK-176. It differs in having a stealthy turret and an below-decks ammunition feed with 150 shells instead of 75.

== Operators ==
=== Current ===
- Algeria
  - Algerian Navy: Adhafer-class corvette
- Bangladesh
  - Bangladesh Navy: Type 056 corvette
- China
  - People's Liberation Army Navy: Type 054A frigate, Type 056 corvette
  - China Coast Guard: Type 056 corvette, Zhaotou-class cutter
- Nigeria
  - Nigerian Navy: P18N offshore patrol vessel
- Pakistan
  - Pakistan Navy: Tughril-class frigate, Zulfiquar-class frigate.

== See also ==
- MKE 76 mm/62-caliber gun
- OTO Melara 76 mm

== Sources ==
- Bhan, Aditya (June 2023). "The Role of China-Made Frigates in the Pakistan Navy's Power Projection Matrix" (PDF). Issue Brief. No. 644. Observer Research Foundation.
- Valenti, Alix (June 2016). "Thousand Island Dressing" (PDF). Asian Military Review. Vol. 24, no. 4.
