= Zhaotou-class cutter =

Class of Chinese patrol vessel

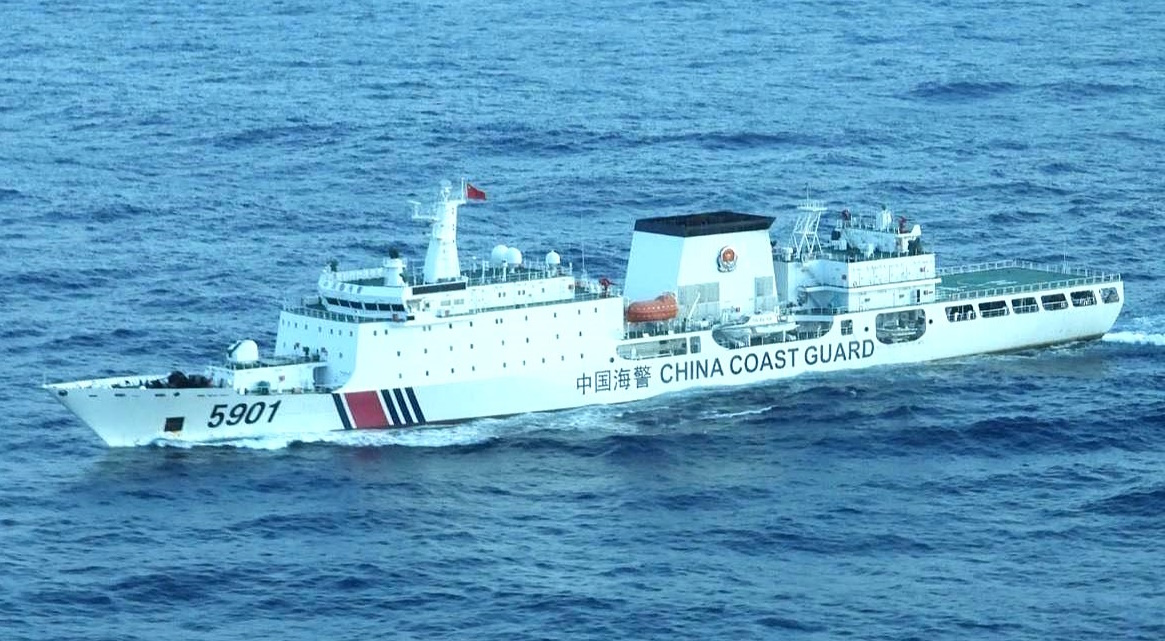
- Nansha, a Zhaotou class cutter

Class overview
- Name: Zhaotou-class patrol cutter
- Builders: Jiangnan Shipyard
- Operators: China Coast Guard
- In service: 2015–present
- In commission: 2015–2017
- Planned: 2
- Completed: 2
- Active: 2

General characteristics
- Type: Large patrol vessel
- Displacement: 10,000 tons (empty); 12,000 tons (full displacement)
- Length: 165 m (541 ft 4 in)
- Beam: Over 20 m (65 ft 7 in)
- Propulsion: MAN high-power diesel engine (speculated)
- Speed: 25 knots (46 km/h; 29 mph)
- Range: 15,000 nmi (28,000 km; 17,000 mi) (estimated)
- Boats & landing craft carried: Several boats
- Armament: 1 x H/PJ-26 76 mm naval gun; 2 x 30 mm secondary guns; 2 x anti-aircraft machine guns
- Aircraft carried: 2 x Z-8 helicopters
- Aviation facilities: Hangar facility

The Zhaotou class is a NATO reporting name of the ship class of patrol vessels of the China Coast Guard. It is the largest armed coast guard cutter in the world, surpassing the previous record holder, the Japanese Shikishima class.

== Development ==
According to Chinese state media, the development of the Zhaotou class began around December 2012, before the formation of the China Coast Guard under the State Oceanic Administration. The chief engineer of Jiangnan Shipyard, Hu Keyi, stated that the company was contracted to build two 10,000-ton maritime patrol vessels. In January 2014, Beijing Daily and Global Times reported that the China Shipbuilding Industry Corporation (CSIC), parent company of Jiangnan Shipyard, posted on their website that they signed a contract in 2013 to build two maritime patrol vessels, one of which is 10,000 tons. The contract is stated to be worth 280 million Yuan. Japanese media also reported that China purchased 40 German MAN high-power diesel engines in 2013 to power future coast guard vessels, including the 10,000-ton vessels.

== History ==
The first ship, Haijing 2901 or CCG 2901, finished construction sometime in late 2014. It set sailed for the first time on 19 May 2015; being deployed to the East China Sea. The number "2" in the serial number denotes that the ship is under the East China Sea branch of the China Coast Guard.

The second ships, Nansha(5901), previously with the number 3901, finished construction in 2016. It is deployed to the South China Sea.

In May 2017, the Nansha completed its first patrol in the South China Sea. The vessel spent 19 days patrolling and visiting in and around Chinese-held islands in the sea. The ship carried a crew of 17 law enforcement personnel and operated two unspecified UAVs.

== Design ==
The most noticeable aspect of this class of patrol ships is its massive size. The Zhaotou class is 165 metres (541 ft 4 in) in length, over 20 metres (65 ft 7 in) in beam, and has an empty displacement of 10,000 tons, with a full displacement of 12,000 tons. In comparison, the Japanese Shikishima class has a gross tonnage of 6,500 tons, with a full displacement of 9,350 tons (7,175 tons for gross tonnage). During the Zhaotou's development, China's then-largest patrol vessel, Haijian 50, displaced only 4,000 tons. The large size gives the vessel abundant fuel and supplies to carry out extended missions in vast open waters.

The Zhaotou class is armed with an H/PJ-26 76 mm naval gun, two 30 mm auxiliary guns, and two anti-aircraft machine guns. The ships can travel at a top speed of 25 knots (46 km/h; 29 mph) and a range of over 10,000 nautical miles (19,000 km; 12,000 mi). The estimated range is believed to be 15,000 nautical miles (28,000 km; 17,000 mi). Each vessel can carry two Z-8 helicopters and several boats. The Zhaotou class possess a large helicopter platform and hangar to accommodate large Z-8 helicopters. The vessel is speculated to be powered by MAN high-power diesel engines.

== Media coverage and analysis ==
Due to the exceptionally large size of the Zhaotou-class ships, the vessels have gained large amounts of media attention, with various media outlets referring to them as "monsters" or "mega-cutters". Contrary to media coverage, it is not the largest coast guard vessel in the world; that record belongs to the USCGC Healy icebreaker of the United States Coast Guard. Observers have noted that the large size of the Zhaotou class gives it an intimidating factor over neighboring coast guards and foreign vessels. This is due to contests of ramming being observed between ships in disputed maritime regions where China is involved. The Zhaotou class' large size would deter ships from ramming them or chase away foreign vessels in fear of getting rammed by them.

The Diplomat stated that the vessels would likely help solidify China's maritime claims due to the China Coast Guard playing a much more active role in the disputes than the navy. The Center for International Maritime Security (CIMSEC) believes that the ships represents the culmination of China's shipbuilding expansion and policy changes to the China Coast Guard. The think tank also noted the significance of the ships possessing naval guns, indicating that China is adopting a more aggressive stance towards it maritime disputes. Previous Chinese coast guard ships were either unarmed, lightly armed, or simply equipped with just water cannons. CIMSEC concluded that the ships would likely escalate tensions further in the Senkaku Islands dispute and the South China Sea dispute.

The construction of the Zhaotou class has been speculated by Japanese media to be a response to Japan's Shikishima-class patrol vessels and for the China Coast Guard to match, if not, surpass the Japan Coast Guard. The Shikishima class was previous record holder for the world's largest coast cutter; dwarfing any of China's coast guard ships before the Zhaotou's introduction. The two class of ships are often compared with each other, with observers noting that in terms of design, function, and capabilities, the Zhaotou-class somewhat parallels with that of the Shikishima class. Japan, likewise, procured three additional Shikishima-class vessels between 2016 and 2018 due to the need to "strengthen security around the Senkaku islands".

== Ships in the class ==
Name	Namesake	Laid down	Launched	Commissioned	Builder
Zhoushan (2901)	Zhoushan		Late 2014	2015	Jiangnan Shipyard
Nansha (5901)	Nansha		January 2016	2017	Jiangnan Shipyard
