= Tarantul-class corvette =

Class of Soviet missile corvette

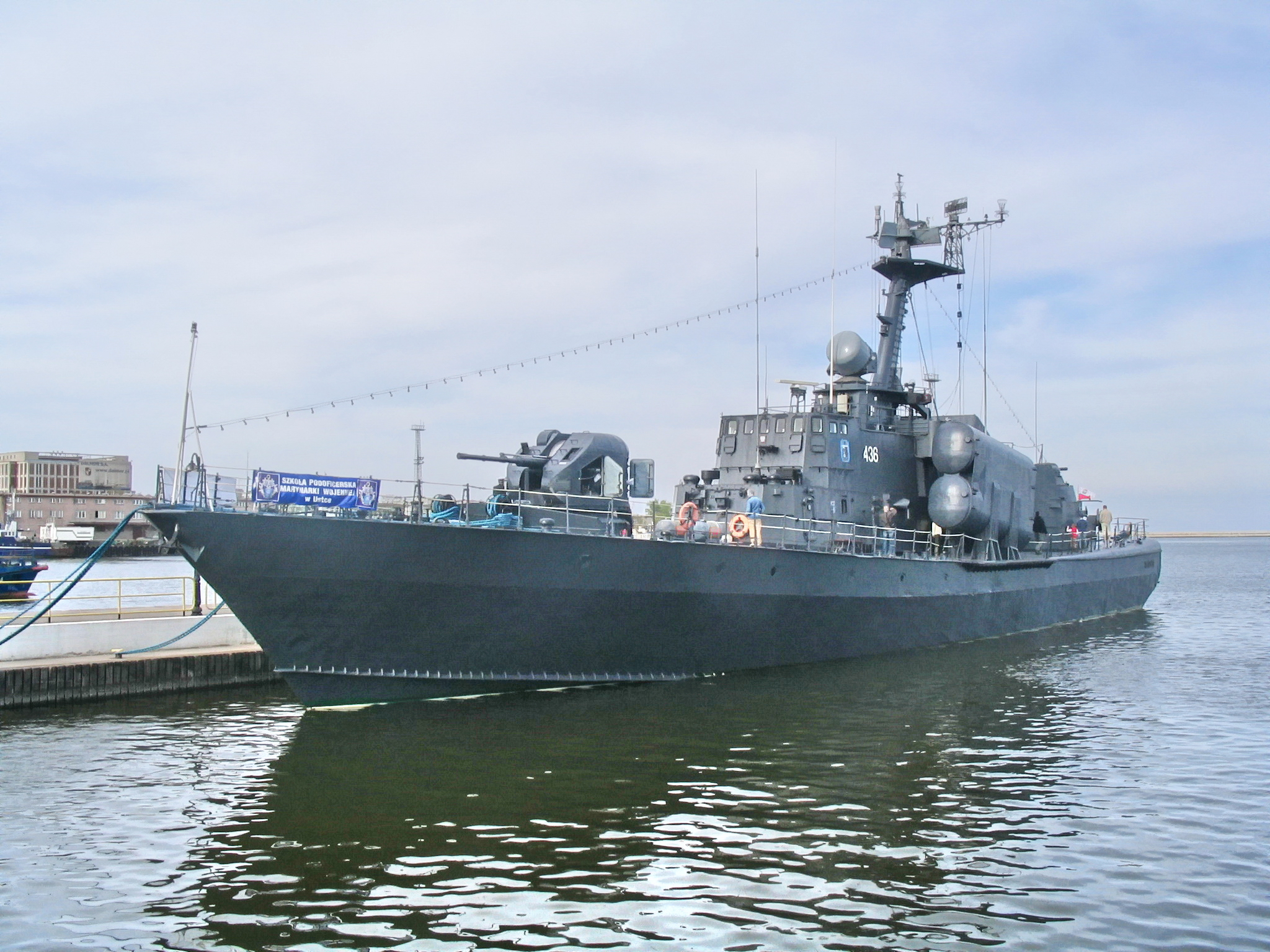
- ORP Metalowiec, a Polish Navy Tarantul-I missile corvette in Gdynia

Class overview
- Name: Tarantul class
- Builders: Vympel Shipyard
- Operators: Soviet Navy; Russian Navy; Bulgarian Navy; Volksmarine; German Navy; Indian Navy; Polish Navy; Romanian Naval Forces; Ukrainian Navy; Vietnam People's Navy; Yemeni Navy; Egyptian Navy; United States Navy; Turkmen Naval Forces
- Subclasses: Pauk-class corvette; Veer-class corvette
- Completed: ~80 (including Pauk class)
- Lost: 1
- Preserved: 2 or 3

General characteristics
- Type: Missile corvette
- Displacement: 480 long tons (488 t) standard, 540 long tons (549 t) full load
- Length: 56.0 m (183 ft 9 in)
- Beam: 10.5 m (34 ft 5 in)
- Draught: 2.5 m (8 ft 2 in)
- Propulsion: 2 shaft COGAG turbines at 11,000 hp (8,200 kW) each, plus 2 cruising engines at 4,000 hp (3,000 kW) each (there were diesel and turbine versions of the cruising engines),
- Speed: 42 knots (78 km/h; 48 mph)
- Range: 2,400 nmi (4,400 km; 2,800 mi) at 12 knots (22 km/h; 14 mph), operational autonomy for 10 days
- Complement: 50
- Sensors & processing systems: Radar: Spin trough, Bass Tilt, Peel pair, Pop group
- Armament: 4 × P-15 Termit/SS-N-2 Styx or 4 × P-270 Moskit/SS-N-22 Sunburn or 16 × Kh-35 Uran/SS-N-25 Switchblade anti-ship missiles or 4 × BrahMos; 1 SA-N-5 SAM (1x4) MANPADS air defence missiles; 1 × 76 mm AK-176 dual purpose main gun; 2 × AK-630 30 mm gun or 1 × CADS-N-1 Kashtan CIWS (close-in weapon system) for air defence

The Tarantul-class corvette, Soviet designation Project 1241 Molniya (Russian: Молния, lit. 'Lightning') are a class of Russian missile corvettes (large missile cutters in Soviet classification).

They have the NATO reporting name Tarantul (not to be confused with the Stenka-class patrol boat, whose official Soviet name is also Project 205P Tarantul). These ships were designed to replace the Project 205M Tsunami missile cutter (NATO: Osa-class missile boat).

A new updated variant of the class (Project 12418) was projected to start entering service in 2025.

== Development ==
In the late 1970s, the Soviets realised the need for a larger, more seaworthy craft with better gun armament and higher positioned air search radars. In the Tarantul class, both the single 76 mm (3.0 in) main gun and the two 30 mm (1.2 in) Gatling-type guns are used for air defence, together with a comprehensive electronic warfare suite. The boats are built by the Petrovsky yard (St. Petersburg), Rybinsk and Ulis yard (Vladivostok). A version of these ships for coastal anti-submarine warfare and patrol was developed as the Pauk-class corvette or Project 1241.2. The Indian Navy paid approximately $30 million each to license-produce Tarantul-I in the early 1990s. With over 30 sales on the export market the Tarantul has been a relative success for the Russian shipbuilding industry.

== Versions ==
=== Project 1241.1 (NATO: Tarantul-II) ===
The naming convention for NATO reporting name Tarantul was a special case here. NATO called the first version of the class as Tarantul-II, given that they had a better sensor suite/equipment than the ships of the following class Tarantul-I, which was produced exclusively for export.

A first version was based on the Pauk-class hull, though with significantly increased weight. Equipped with four SS-N-2 'Styx' anti-ship missiles (either the 40 km; 25 mi range P-15 'Termit' missile or the later P-20 variant with 80 km; 50 mi range) and the associated 'Plank Shave' radar targeting system (45 km; 28 mi range in active mode of surveillance, 75–100 km; 47–62 mi range in passive mode, with an added air surveillance capability). One AK–176 76.2 mm main gun and two AK-630 30 mm six-barreled Gatling guns, the latter CIWS system supported by the 'Bass Tilt' targeting radar. Furthermore, there is a Fasta-N SA-N-5 quadruple MANPADS launcher and two PK-16 decoy launchers.

Propulsion is a COGOG system (COmbined Gas Or Gas) consisting of two M70 at 12,000 hp (8,900 kW) high power gas turbines with a combined 24,200 hp (18,000 kW) output for full power and two cruise gas turbines type M75 with a combined output of 5,000 hp (3,700 kW). Top speed is 38 knots (70 km/h; 44 mph).

Between 1979 and 1984, 13 ships of the type were built. Another ship, R-55, was rebuilt after its completion as a test vessel for the 'Kortik' short-range defense system for Project 1241.7.

=== Project 1241.RE (NATO: Tarantul-I) ===
To clarify, by NATO's definition, Project 1241.RE (NATO: Tarantul-I) was an export version of Project 1241.1 (NATO: Tarantul-II).

This class of ships could be distinguished by the lack of fire control radar on the roof of the bridge. Instead, the fire control radar, X-band "Garpun-Bal" (NATO: "Plank Shave"), built for the anti-ship missiles, was installed on the top of the mast. Other equipment included a small navigation radar type "Kivach-2" on the bridge roof (or MR-312 "Pechera-1" on the ships of Poland), and the gun-fire control radar MR-123 Vympel (NATO: "Bass Tilt") at the foot of the mast. Two PK-16 decoy launchers were also installed. The model of the missiles in the KT-138 launch containers were P-20 (NATO: SS-N-2B), basically they were P-15 updated with the new guidance system but with the original 40 km range.

Between 1977 and 1979, 22 ships of this class were produced exclusively for export. Only one of these ships, R-26, was retained by the Soviet Navy for training purposes. India bought five of these ships as Veer-class corvettes, and would later produce eight ships of the same class domestically. Vietnam also bought four Project 1241.RE ships from various sources over the years.

=== Project 12411 (1241.1M/1241.1MR) (NATO: Tarantul-III/Tarantul-III Mod) ===
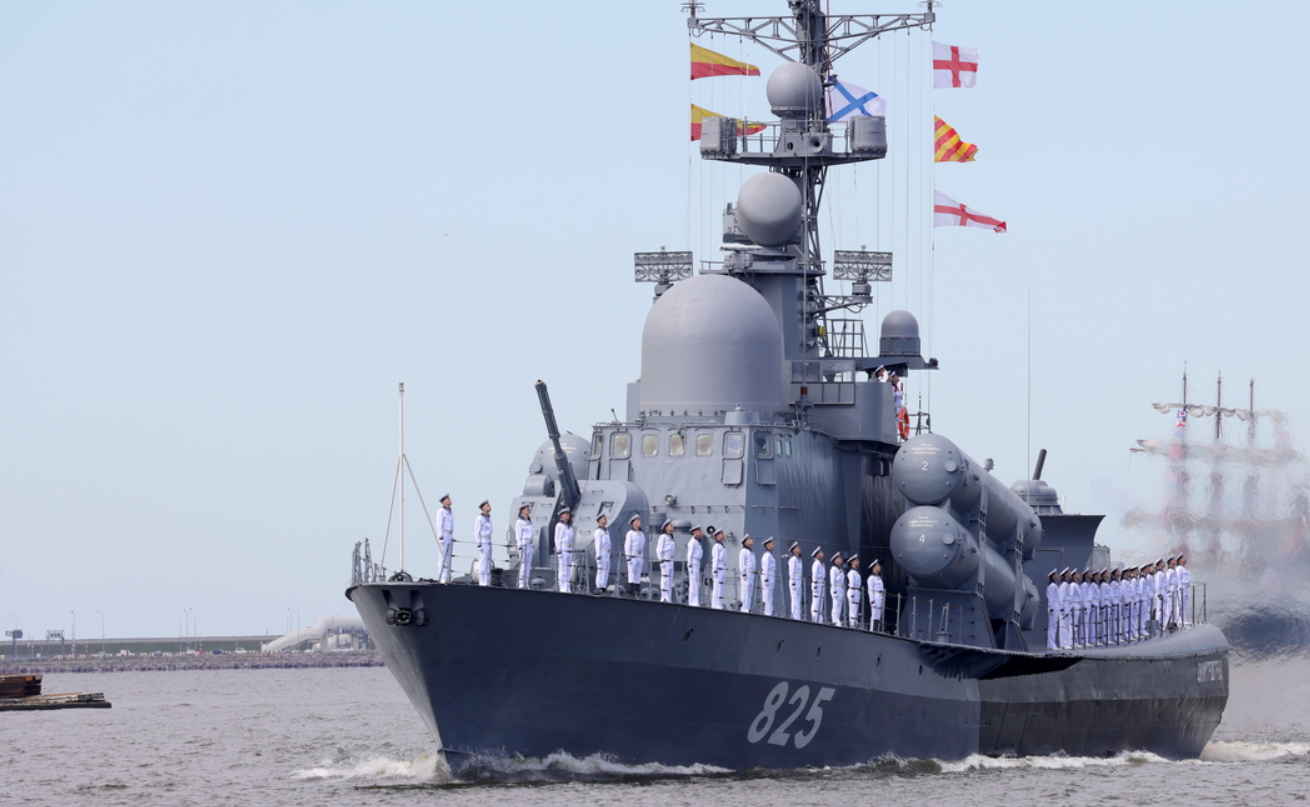
Missile boat Dimitrovgrad during the naval parade on 31 July 2022

Retaining the main armament and basic hull form of the 1241.RE (NATO: Tarantul-I) class, 1241.1M (NATO: Tarantul-III) received important upgrades. Apart from a modest but useful internal redesign, the Tarantul-III had a new type of propulsion—a CODAG (COmbined Diesel And Gas) system. Two M-70 gas turbines (rated at 12,000 hp each) and two M510 (rated at 4,000 hp each) diesel engines were used, being a big improvement over the earlier COGOG system both in terms of serviceability (the two cruise diesels being almost something of a Soviet 'classic'), fuel efficiency and, most importantly, service life expectancy compared to the older NK-12Ms. The maximum speed reached 42 knots (78 km/h; 48 mph).

The superstructures were redesigned and the angled mast of the previous projects has been replaced by a narrow, straight lattice. The sensor position remained almost the same as the Project 1241.1. The "Pechera" navigation radar was off the roof of the bridge, with the MR-123 "Vympel" fire control radar installed. Two jamming system (NATO: "Wine Glass") were installed on both sides at the foot of the mast. The reason for this was the installation of four SS-N-22 'Sunburn' supersonic ship-to-ship missiles with a range of at least 100 km. The associated radar system is the L-band 'Band Stand' radar, with a 120 km active and 500 km (310 mi) passive range and the capability to track 15 different targets. The missiles can also receive third party guidance through the 'Light Bulb' uplink (from other ships, helicopters or long range patrol aircraft). Cannon armament is retained, as were the PK-16 launchers, although Soviet Navy ships benefited from the improved SA-N-8 quadruple MANPADS launcher. At least one ship had an SA-N-11 Kashtan gun and missile CIWS installed instead of the AK-630s.

The Tarantul-III, built from 1987 on, received an improved electronic countermeasures suite, consisting of two 'Half Hat' and two 'Foot Ball' jamming systems, coupled to four improved PK-10 decoy launchers. At least 24 of these ships were built for the Soviet Navy before production ended in 1992.

Between 1985 and 2001, 34 ships of this class were built. After the construction of first batch of 11 ships, the anti-ship missiles were changed from the P-80 "Moskit" to the more modern model P-270 "Moskit-M", therefore the following 23 boats had a new ID: Project 1241.1MR.

The guided missile corvette R-60 was further modernized in 2005, having the two AK-630M CIWS removed, and replaced with "Palash" CIWS.

=== Project 1242.1/1241.8 'Molniya' ===
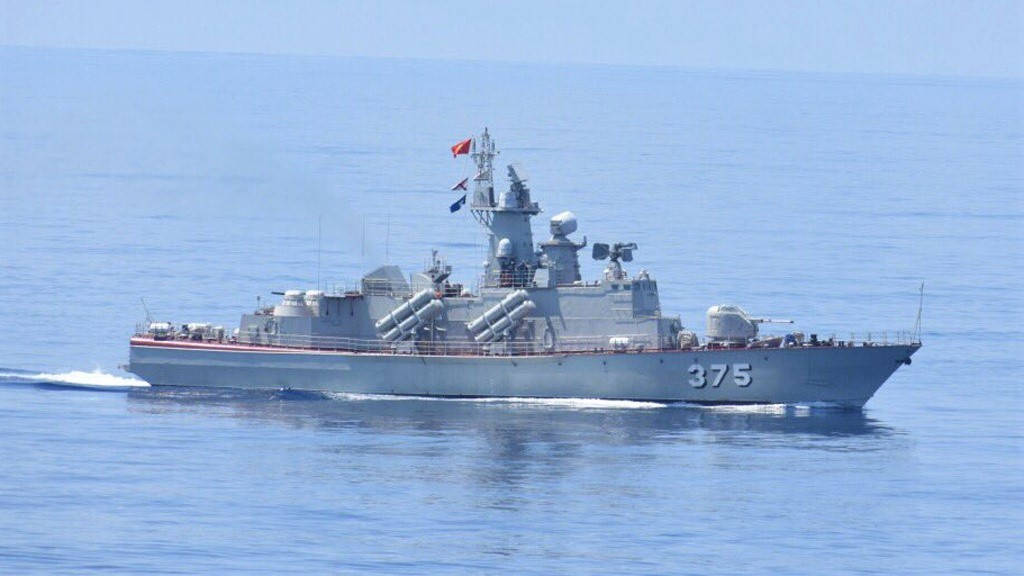
A Tarantul-class corvette of the Vietnam People's Navy

Project 1242.1 and project 1241.8 Molniya ("Lightning") are further developments of the Tarantul family of ships. The two projects has been modified and rearmed with modern missile systems like the Uran-E and are more capable ships than the Tarantul types. The ships are built by the Russian Vympel Shipyard. Russia received at least one boat for trials in the 1990s and in 1999 Vietnam ordered two vessels. Vietnam is currently the main user of the Molniya class, with two Russian-made ships and six locally built ships. Vietnam started its own production line of 1241.8 Molniya ships with the assistance of Almaz Central Design Bureau in Russia. The first two locally built ships were delivered in July 2014, two more in June 2015, and the last two in October 2017. The Vietnamese warships are armed with a AK-176 76 mm gun, 16 Uran-E anti-ship missiles, four Igla-M air-defence missiles and two AK-630 close-in-weapon systems. The Vietnamese ships are also larger at 56.9 m (186 ft 8 in) in length and a maximum displacement of 563 tons. They have a range of 1,700 nautical miles (3,100 km; 2,000 mi) with 44 crew members on board. The Indian Navy ordered four further modified 1241.8 Tarantuls; the order was later reduced to two. These last two ships of the Veer class are armed with 16 SS-N-25 'Switchblade' / Uran-E missiles, an OTO Melara 76 mm gun instead of the AK-176, and MR 352 Positiv-E (NATO: Cross Dome) radar. In 2009 Libya ordered three ships, however, the Libyan Civil War in 2011 put a stop to any acquisitions. Shortly afterwards Turkmenistan acquired three Type 1241.8 vessels, possibly those that had been ordered by Libya but not delivered.

The Russian Navy received two upgraded Molniya-class missile boats in early 2019; they were initially built for a foreign customer, but the contract was cancelled, so the Russian Navy acquired them. The boats replaced the Moskit with eight Kh-35U anti-ship missiles, and the MANPADS launcher with the Pantsir-M gun/missile system. They also had a modern radar phased antenna array. One boat was expected to operate in the Black Sea and the other in the Caspian Sea.

==== Russian domestic developments ====
Class overview
- Name: Project 12418 (Tarantul IV class)
- Builders: Vympel Shipyard
- Operators: Russian Navy
- In commission: Projected from 2025/26
- Completed: 2

General characteristics
- Type: Missile corvette
- Displacement: 500 long tons (508 t) full load
- Length: 56.1 m (184 ft 1 in)
- Beam: 10.2 m (33 ft 6 in)
- Draught: 2.2 m (7 ft 3 in)
- Propulsion: Two CODAD diesels
- Speed: 29 knots (54 km/h; 33 mph)+
- Range: 1,650 nmi (3,060 km; 1,900 mi) at 14 knots (26 km/h; 16 mph), operational autonomy for 10 days
- Complement: 44
- Sensors & processing systems: 3Ts-25E radar; 3R-60U fire control system (for Uran SSM)
- Armament: Uran antiship missile system: 2x4 3S24 launchers with 3M24 subsonic missiles; 1 76mm AK-176M rapid-fire gun (314 rounds); 2 x 6 30mm AK-630М six-barrel light guns (2000 rounds)

A new Tarantul design, reportedly begun in the 1990s, resulted in a new variant of the class, with the first vessel (Stupinets) being launched in 2024. This variant (also known by Project Number 12418) reportedly incorporates a larger superstructure and new propulsion system (two diesels (CODAD), likely Zwiezda M-507D-1), reducing the top speed to around 29 knots. The main armament is the Uran antiship missile system with 3M24 subsonic missiles and 3R-60U fire control system. The range of the missile is reportedly up to 130 km (up to 260 km with the 3M24U version). The design also incorporates the 76.2mm AK-176MA gun and two six-barrel 30mm AK-630Ms – both in stealth turrets. Decoy launchers are the KT-216/PK-10 Smely system. Two vessels (Stupinets and Strelok) had been launched as of October 2025. The lead vessel has commenced sea trials and both vessels are to be based with the Caspian Flotilla. In July 2026, Ukrainian sources reported that one Tarantul IV was struck by drones, though the specific vessel and the extent of damage was unclear.

== Current operators ==
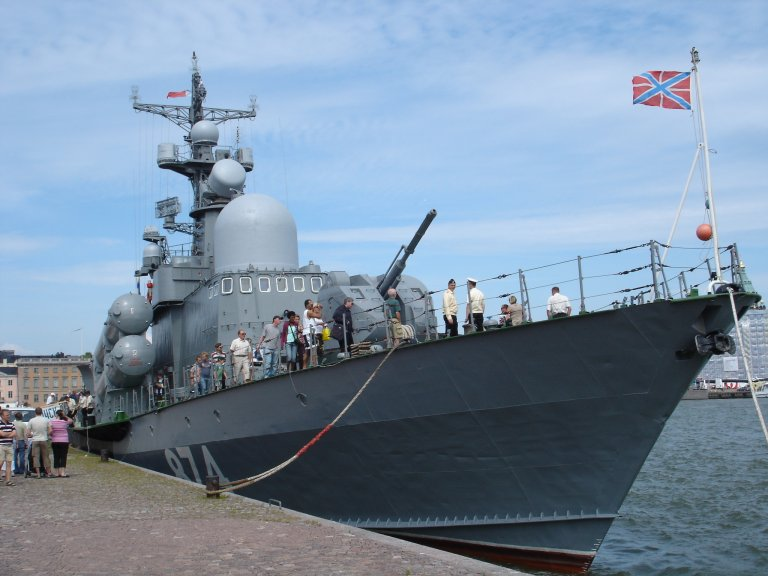
Morshansk

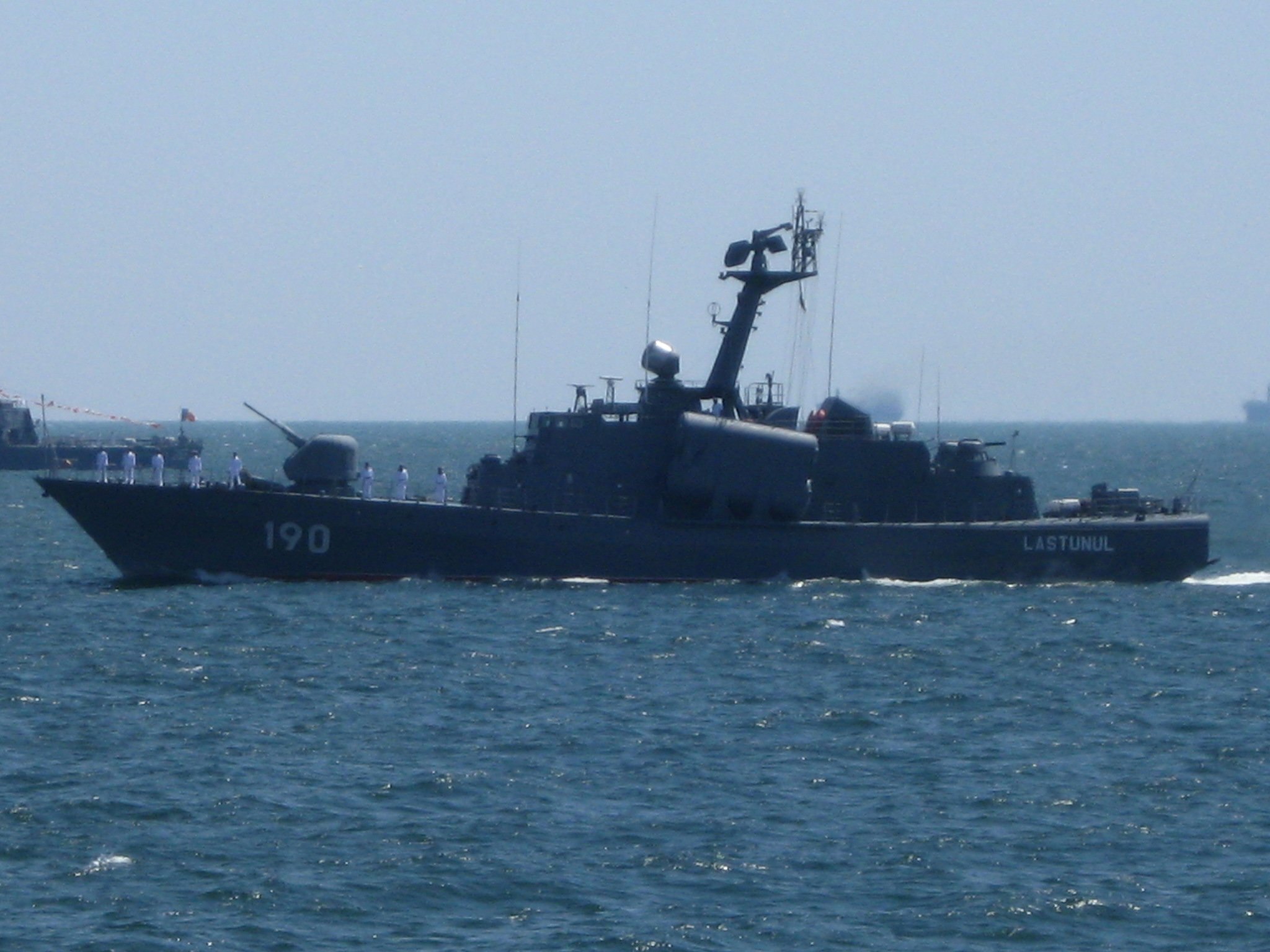
Lăstunul

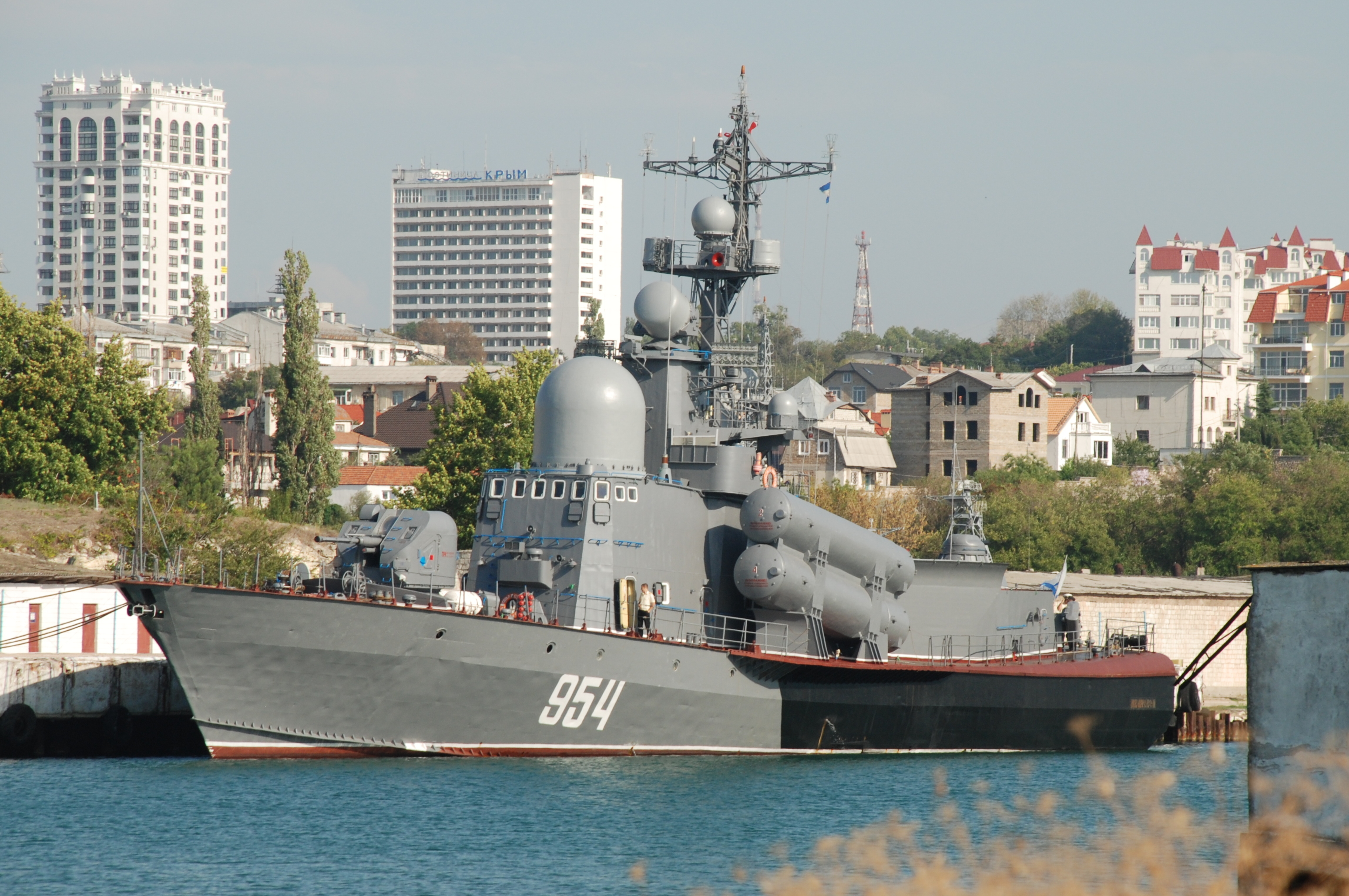
Ivanovets at Sevastopol in 2012

Main Directorate of Intelligence footage of the attack on Ivanovets by Group 13.

Bulgarian Navy

- One ship in service – 101 Мълния ("Lightning").

Egyptian Navy

- One ship in service. In 2014, Egypt showed interest in the acquisition of the P-32 (Project 12421 Molniya) missile boat but the contract was signed in 2015. In July 2015, the missile boat headed to the Mediterranean Sea and arrived at the port of Alexandria at the end of the month. The P-32 was handed over to the Egyptian Navy on 10 August after participating in the inauguration of the New Suez Canal.

Indian Navy

- Seven license-built Indian variants, designated as Veer-class corvettes, are currently in active service. The last Soviet-built vessel in service, Nishank, was decommissioned on 3 June 2022.

Romanian Naval Forces

- Three ships, all in service, homeport Mangalia.
  - Zborul, commissioned 1990
  - Pescărușul, commissioned 1991
  - Lăstunul, commissioned 1991

Russian Navy

- As of 2025, approx. 16 vessels of project 1241.7 and project 12411/1242.1 (Tarantul IIIs) were in service with the Russian Navy (+ up to 2 new Tarantul IVs likely to enter service with the Caspian Flotilla in due course)
  - Pacific Fleet – 10 ships
  - Baltic Fleet – 4 ships
  - Black Sea Fleet – 2 ships; on 1 February 2024, Ukraine released video purported to show the sinking of the vessel Ivanovets by uncrewed naval drones; all Tarantul IIs (Project 1241.1) reported out of service as of 2024

Turkmen Naval Forces

- Three ships acquired circa 2011, possibly the three originally ordered by Libya but not delivered.
  - 830 Ederman
  - 831 Arkadag
  - 832 Gayratli

Vietnam People's Navy

- 12 ships in service:
  - Four project 1241.RE Tarantul-I missile boats:
    - Hull numbers: 371,372, 373 and 374.
  - Eight project 1241.8 Molniya missile boats/fast attack crafts:
    - Hull numbers: 375, 376, 377, 378, 379, 380, 382 and 383. Six of them were locally built in Ba Son Shipyard under license.

Yemeni Navy

- One ship, currently out of commission.

== Former operators ==
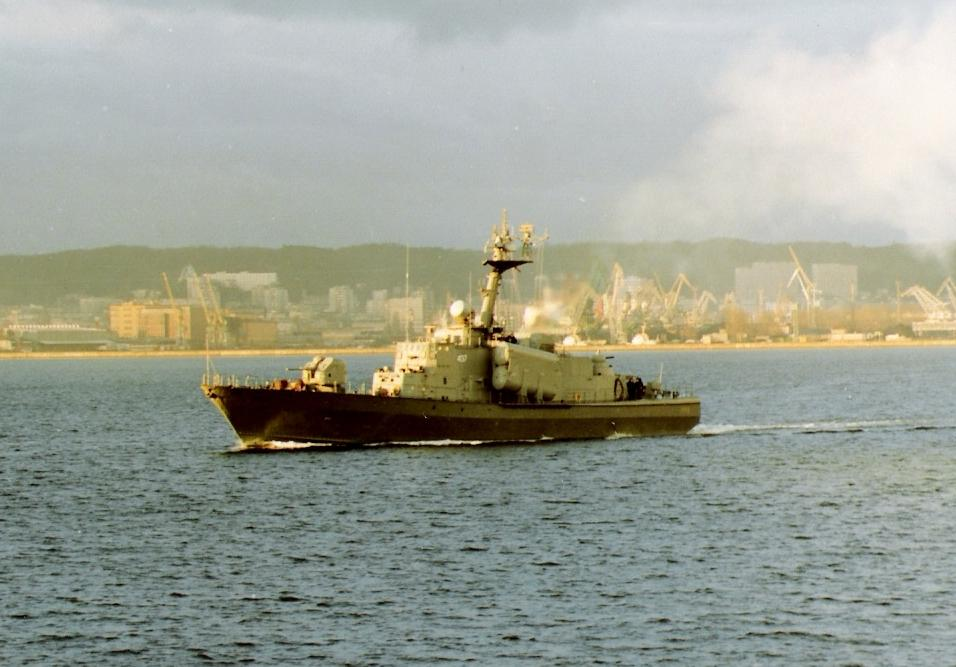
ORP Rolnik, a Polish Navy missile Tarantul-class corvette

Polish Navy

- Four ships built.
  - ORP Górnik (434), decommissioned and scrapped
  - ORP Hutnik (435), decommissioned and scrapped
  - ORP Metalowiec (436), decommissioned and scrapped in April of 2020
  - ORP Rolnik (437), decommissioned and scrapped in April of 2020

Soviet Navy

- 48 ships built.

United States Navy

- Hiddensee was briefly in service with U.S. Navy, after it was transferred from the German Navy. The ship was retired in 1996 and became a museum ship in Battleship Cove in Fall River, Massachusetts. She was later scrapped in 2023 due to her hull deteriorating.

Ukrainian Navy

- Four type 1241 ships, all captured by Russia in March 2014 during the invasion of Crimea.
  - Prydniprovia (believed hulked as floating barracks)
  - Kremenchuk (believed to be in Russian Border Guard service as Kuban)
  - Uzhhorod (believed to be in Russian Border Guard service as Novorossisk)
  - Khmelnytskyi (believed hulked as floating barracks)

Volksmarine

- Five ships built – all retired

== Potential operators ==
Nicaraguan Navy

- Two or possibly three ships ordered in 2013. Reports that two or possibly three ships would be donated by Russia in 2016. They may be the former Russian Navy vessels Kuznetsk, Groza and Burya, or vessels captured from Ukraine in 2014.

== Surviving ships ==
Two Tarantul-class corvettes are preserved globally, with a third boat potentially also preserved as of September 2024.

- Hans Beimler (575) is preserved in Peenemünde, Germany. The ship was one of five corvettes of this class built for the Volksmarine, and served between 1986 and 1991.
- INS Nishank (K43) is preserved at the National Maritime Heritage Complex, Lothal, India. Nishank was built as part of the Veer-class for the Indian Navy, a modified variant of the Tarantul design, and served between 1987 and 2022. She was subsequently transferred for preservation in 2023.
- Tambovsky Komsomolets (formerly R-47) has been preserved at Patriot Park in Kronstadt, Russia. She served between 1987 and 2017. She was moored next to the destroyer Bespokoyny (herself a museum), and was seen at the museum as late as May 2022. However, as of August, she is no longer moored at the position.

In addition, another ex-German ship of the class, the ex-Rudolf Egelhofer (772), which served between 1986 and 1991, and was then transferred to the United States as USNS Hiddensee in 1992 for evaluation, serving until 1996, was preserved at Battleship Cove, Massachusetts, United States of America in 1997. However, she fell into disrepair, and due to deteriorating condition, the ship was scrapped in October 2023.

== See also ==
- List of ships of the Soviet Navy
- List of ships of Russia by project number
