= AK-176 =

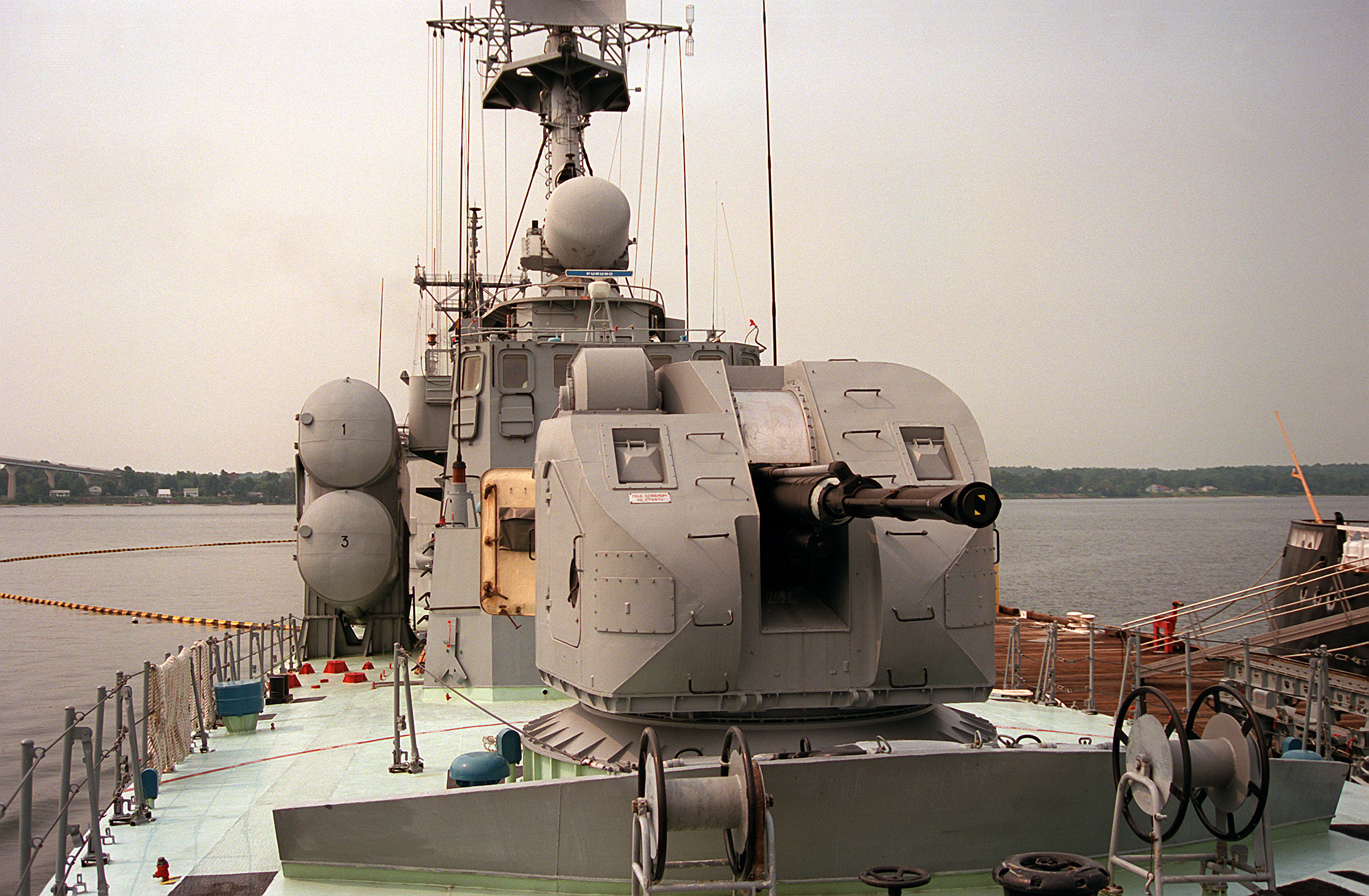
- Gun on the Tarantul I-class corvette USNS Hiddensee
- Type: Naval gun
- Place of origin: Soviet Union

Service history
- In service: 1979
- Used by: See Operators

Production history
- Designer: TSNII BUREVESTNIK
- Designed: 1971
- Manufacturer: Gorky Machine Building Plant
- Produced: 1977
- Variants: AK-176M, AK-176MA, H/PJ-26 (China)

Specifications
- Mass: 16,800 kg (37,000 lb)
- Barrel length: 4,484 mm (176.5 in) (59 calibers)
- Crew: 2 (4 in manual control mode)
- Shell: 76.2×959 mm
- Shell weight: 12.4 kg
- Caliber: 76.2 mm
- Recoil: 380 to 500 mm
- Elevation: -15° to +85°
- Traverse: ±175°
- Rate of fire: 120 rds/min
- Muzzle velocity: 980 m/s
- Effective firing range: 10 km
- Maximum firing range: 15.5 km
- Feed system: 152 ready to fire rounds

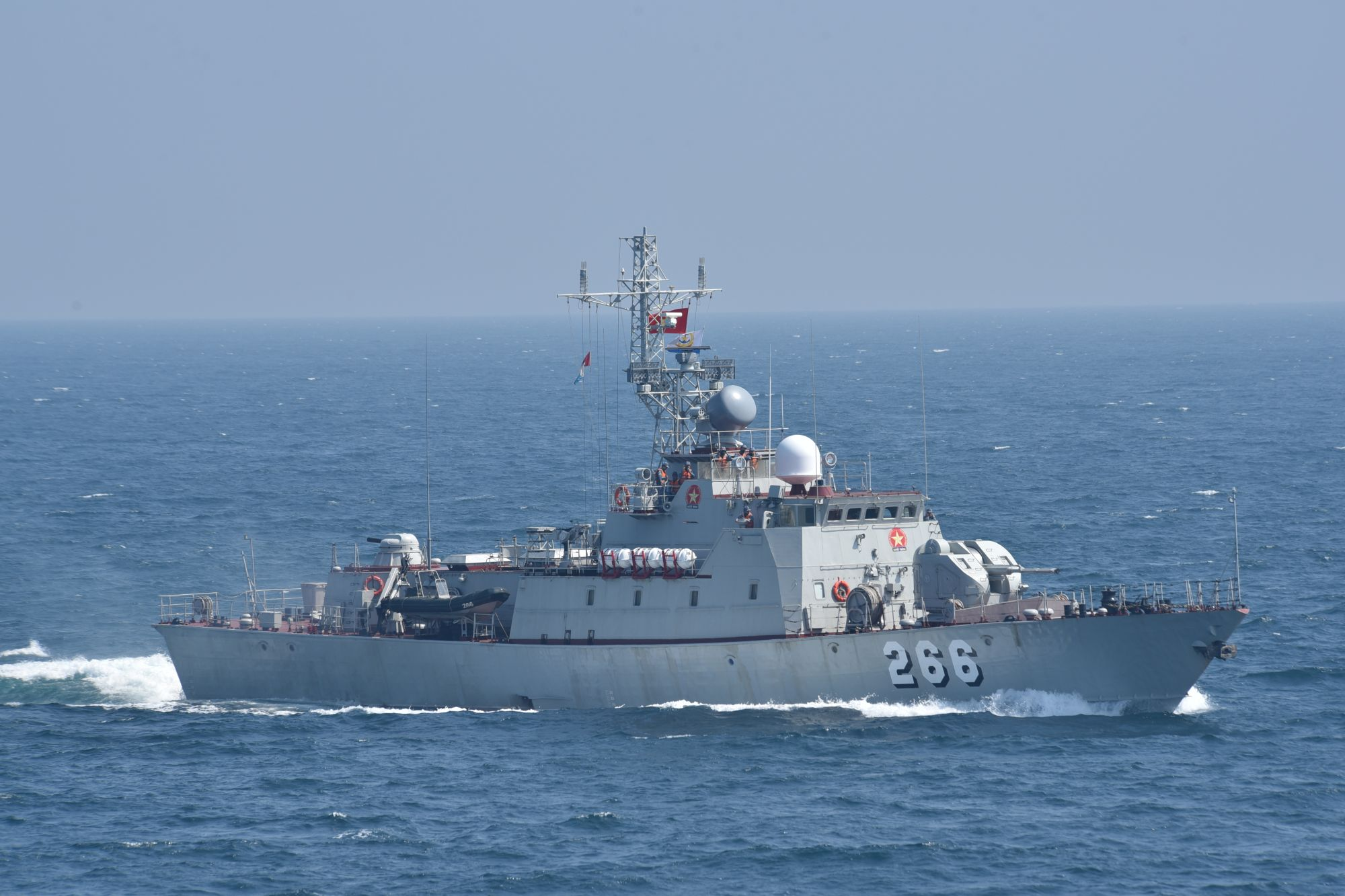
The AK-176M gun mount on a Vietnamese Project 10412 patrol boat

The AK-176 is a Soviet 76mm naval gun mounted in an enclosed turret, that may be used against sea, coastal, and aerial targets, including low flying anti-ship missiles. The system is designed to arm small displacement ships and comprises the Gun Mount with a MR-123-02/76 Fire Control Radar System. It has high survivability owing to autonomous use of the gun mount controlled from the optical sight in the absence of control from the radar system, as well as a capability for fire even if power supply is lost.

== Design ==
The gun is fed by 152 ready to fire rounds and has selectable rates of fire of 30, 60 and 120 rounds per minute. The 120 r.p.m. rate is achieved by firing a burst of 75, but afterwards the gun has to cool off for 30 minutes. The AK-176 is effective against missiles, being able to shoot down AT-2 Swatter (simulating a Harpoon anti-ship missile), taking an average of 25 rounds per kill.

In the late 1980s an upgraded version the AK-176M, with a new fire control system MR-123-02, television targeting and a laser rangefinder, was introduced. This gun, is still in production (AK-176M1) and is the primary medium-caliber artillery systems to all small Soviet ships and is widely exported.

AK-176MA, a further upgrade of the design intended for newer ship classes, such as the Karakurt-class corvettes and project 22160-class patrol ships, completed its trials in 2017. The AK-176MA features improved accuracy, a stealthy turret design, and a significantly reduced weight of under 9 tonnes. It will replace older guns on carrier ships on the process of their modernization.

The equivalent NATO system is the Otobreda 76 mm, another 120 rpm 3 inches gun.

== Operators ==
=== Current ===
- Russia
- Bangladesh
- Algeria
- Bulgaria
- China
- Cameroon
- Egypt
- India
- Pakistan
- Poland
- Romania
- Ukraine
- Vietnam
- Yemen

=== Past users ===
- Soviet Union

== See also ==
- AK-726
- AK-100 (naval gun)
- H/PJ-26 76 mm naval gun
- OTO Melara 76 mm

== Gallery ==
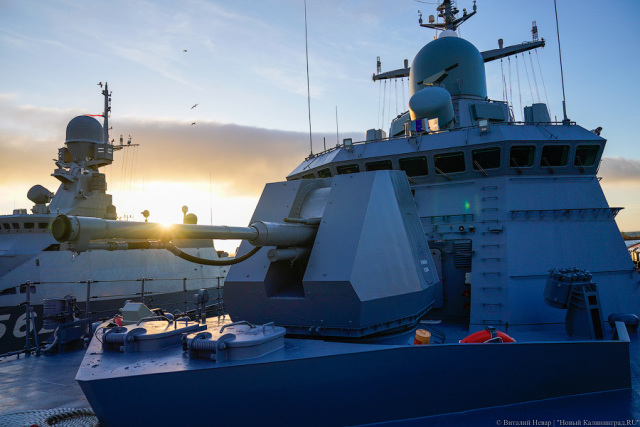
A Russian Karakurt-class corvette with the AK-176MA-01 variant

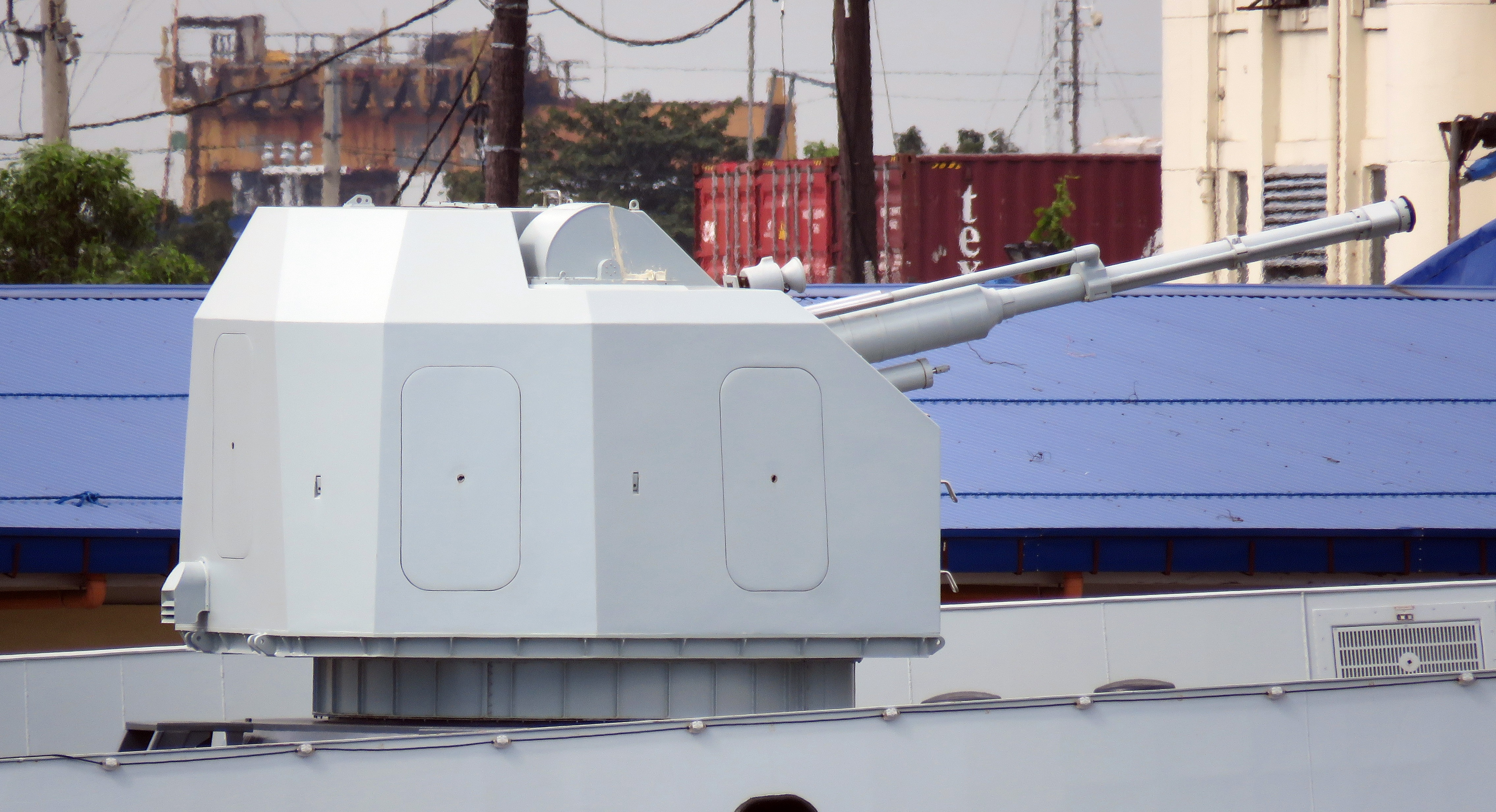
The H/PJ-26 gun mount on Chinese frigate Wuhu (539)

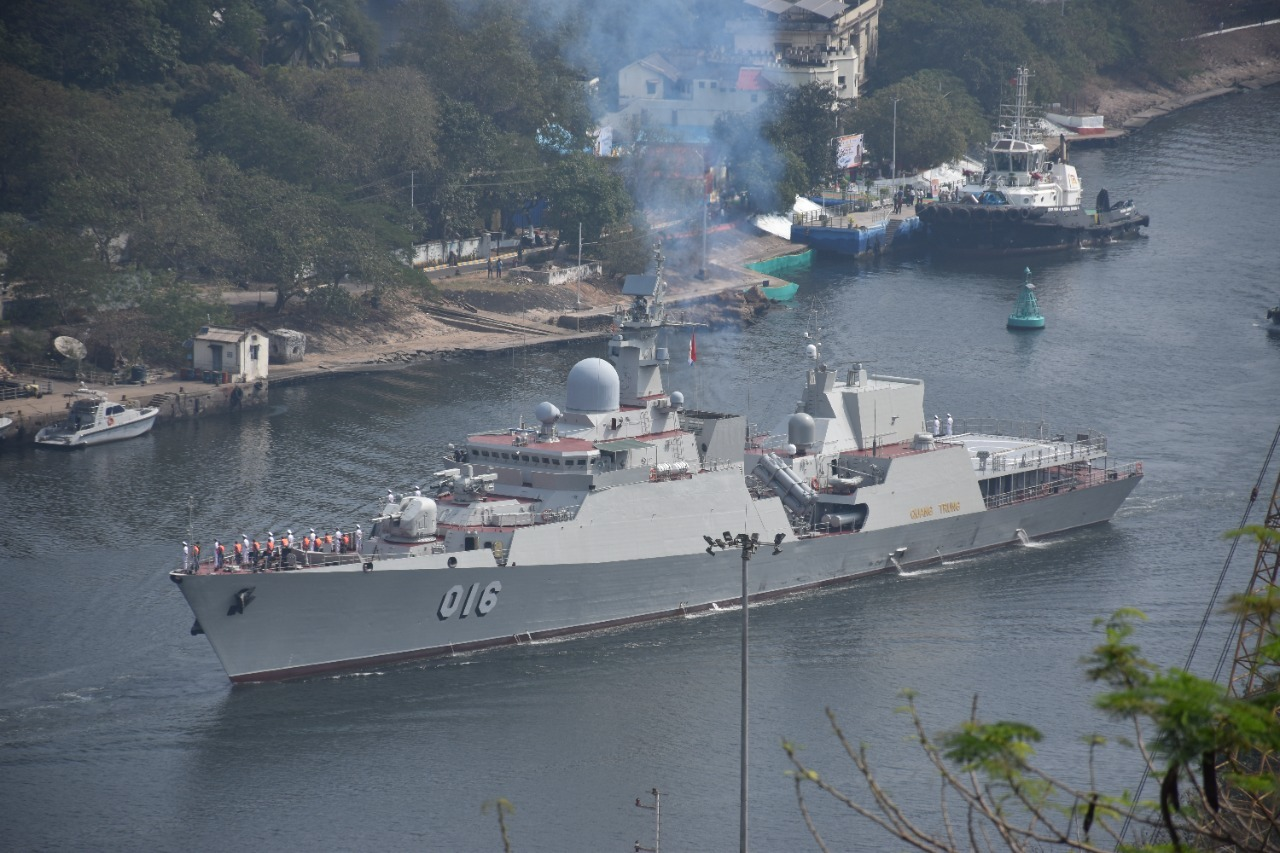
Vietnamese frigate Quang Trung with its AK-176MA gun mount.
