= List of ship commissionings in 2014 =

The list of ship commissionings in 2014 includes a chronological list of all ships commissioned in 2014.

	Operator	Ship	Flag	Class and type	Pennant	Other notes
8 January	People's Liberation Army Navy	Ji'an		Type 056 corvette	586	
15 January	Vietnam People's Navy	Hà Nội		Kilo-class submarine	HQ-182	
27 January	United States Navy	Coronado		Independence-class littoral combat ship	LCS-4	
1 March	United States Navy	Somerset		San Antonio-class amphibious transport dock	LPD-25	
21 March	People's Liberation Army Navy	Kunming		Type 052D destroyer	172	
4 April	Vietnam People's Navy	Hồ Chí Minh City		Kilo-class submarine	HQ-183	
2 May	(United States) National Oceanic and Atmospheric Administration	Reuben Lasker		Oscar Dyson-class fisheries research ship	R 228	
28 May	Russian Navy	Stoikiy		Steregushchy-class corvette		
27 July	Russian Navy	Grad Sviyazhsk		Buyan-M-class corvette		
27 July	Russian Navy	Uglich		Buyan-M-class corvette		
22 August	Russian Navy	Novorossiysk		Kilo-class submarine	B-261	
11 October	United States Navy	America		America-class amphibious assault ship	LHA-6	
25 October	United States Navy	North Dakota		Virginia-class submarine	SSN-784	
28 November	Royal Australian Navy	Canberra		Canberra-class landing helicopter dock	L02	
19 December	Russian Navy	Veliki Ustyug		Buyan-M-class corvette		
19 December	Russian Navy	Vladimir Monomakh		Borei-class submarine	K-551	
22 December	People's Liberation Army Navy	Jinan		Type 052C destroyer	152	
30 December	Russian Navy	Rostov-on-Don		Kilo-class submarine	B-237	
