= Buyan-class corvette =

Russian series of small artillery ships

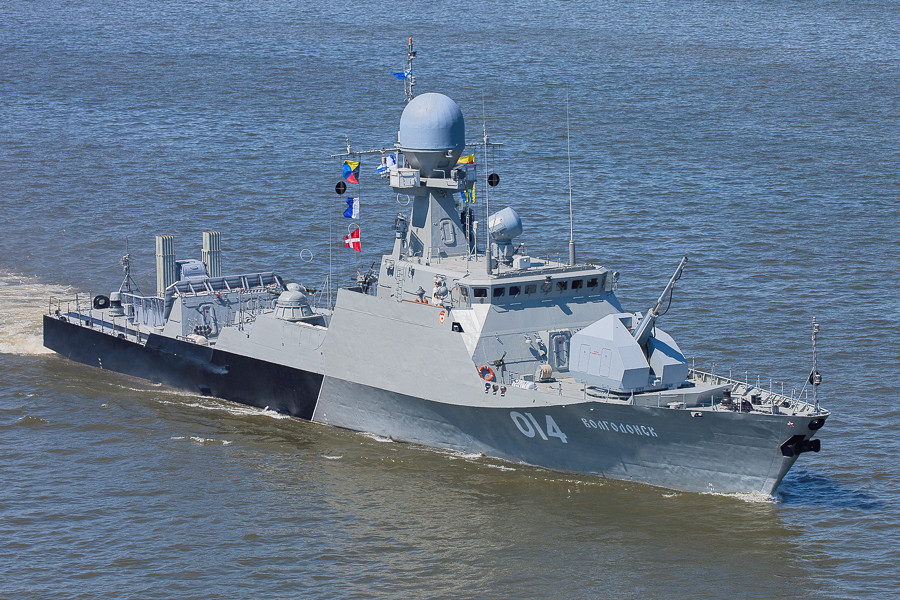
- Buyan-class corvette Volgodonsk (pr 21630)

Class overview
- Name: Buyan class
- Builders: Almaz Shipbuilding Company
- Operators: Russian Navy
- Preceded by: Nanuchka class
- Succeeded by: Karakurt class
- Subclasses: Project 21631 Buyan-M (domestic); Project 21632 Tornado (export)
- Built: 2004–present
- In commission: 2006–present
- Planned: 3
- Completed: 3
- Active: 3

General characteristics
- Type: Gunboat or monitor (Russian classification: Small artillery ship)
- Displacement: 420 t (410 long tons) (standard) 508 t (500 long tons) (full)
- Length: 62 m (203 ft 5 in)
- Beam: 9.6 m (31 ft 6 in)
- Height: 6.57 m (21 ft 7 in)
- Draft: 2 m (6 ft 7 in)
- Propulsion: 2 shaft CODAD, 4 × Zvezda M520, 10,875 kW (14,584 shp) and Kolomna Diesel, Pumpjet.
- Speed: 28 knots (52 km/h; 32 mph)
- Range: 1,500 nmi (2,800 km; 1,700 mi)
- Endurance: 15 days
- Complement: 29–36
- Sensors & processing systems: 5P-26M Pozitiv-M phased array radar system (Pozitiv-ME1.2 for export); MR-231 navigation radar; 5P-10-03 Laska fire control system (5P-10-03E for export); МР-123 fire control system; Anapa-M anti-saboteur sonar system (Anapa-ME for export)
- Electronic warfare & decoys: 2 × 10 PK-10 decoy launchers
- Armament: 1 × 100 mm A-190-01 naval gun; 2 × 30 mm AK-630 CIWS; 1 × 20 122 mm retractable A-215 "Grad-M"; 1 × 4 3M47 Gibka surface-to-air missiles; 1 × 10 55 mm DP-65 anti-saboteur grenade launcher; 2 × 14.5 mm KPV type

The Buyan class (Russian: Буян, lit. 'Buyan'), Russian designation Project 21630 Buyan, are a series of corvettes (small artillery in Russian classification) developed by Zelenodolsk Design Bureau for the Russian Navy's Caspian Flotilla. The Buyan-class ships are primarily designed for operations within littoral zones to protect Russia's vast coastal areas. Due to the small tonnage, they can operate even within shallow parts of oceans and seas and Russia's extensive inland waterway system. The export variant is known as Project 21632 Tornado. Since 2010, all subsequent vessels are being constructed as improved Project 21631 subclass, incorporating greater tonnage, stealth technology and the 3S14 vertical launching system.

== Design ==
Project 21630, codenamed "Buyan", a class of ships of the "river-sea" type, was developed by the Zelenodolsk Design Bureau (FSUE) under the leadership of Chief Designer Yakov Evgeneyevich Kushnir. Scientific and technical support for the design and construction of the ship for the Russian Navy was provided by the 1st Central Research Institute of the Russian Ministry of Defense. This ship was designed by the Zelenodolsk Design Bureau taking into account the characteristics of the Caspian Sea and the Volga Delta. The main requirements for the ships were good seaworthiness and the ability to navigate the shallow depths of the northern Caspian Sea and the Volga Delta. Therefore, the ships' small size and displacement enables them to operate within inland river systems, including traversing the Moscow Canal. This allows them to redeploy to various seas around European Russia. Among the requirements of the tactical and technical specifications was a specified cruising range, enabling the ship to navigate the entire length of the Volga and Caspian Seas.

The corvettes are armed with a 100 mm A190-1 dual-purpose naval gun, two 30 mm AK-630 CIWS, two 14.5 mm MPTU machine guns, a 3M-47 Gibka anti-aircraft missile launcher, and one Grad-M multiple rocket launcher. The propulsion system consists of two main 112-cylinder (2 × 56) M520 Zvezda radial diesel engines, each producing 10,000 hp, coupled via a final drive (reduction gear).

== Construction history ==
The lead ship of the class, Astrakhan, was laid down at the Almaz Shipbuilding Сompany in Saint Petersburg on 30 January 2004.

The second ship of the class, Volgodonsk (previously Kaspiysk), was laid down at the same shipyard on 25 February 2005.

Astrakhan was launched on 7 October 2005 and, after sea trials was commissioned on 1 September 2006..

Makhachkala, the third ship of the Project 21630 class, was laid down on 24 March 2006.

Volgodonsk was launched 6 May 2011, had its acceptance act signed on 20 December 2011, was commissioned on 28 December 2011, and entered service with the Caspian Flotilla in July of 2012.

Makhachkala was launched on 27 April 2012 and was commissioned 4 December 2012.

== Operational history ==
On 6 November 2024, a modified A-22 drone (flying bomb) from the Armed Forces of Ukraine struck the Kaspiysk naval base reportedly damaging a Buyan-class corvette of the Caspian Flotilla along with two Gepard-class frigates.

== Variants ==
- Project 21630 Buyan
- Project 21631 Buyan-M – Upgraded design with modernised systems and new weapons
- Project 21632 Tornado– Export design
- Project 21635 Sarsar – Unveiled at Army-2022 expo, with an increased number of VLS cells, as well as a larger displacement overall

== Ships ==
Name	Builder	Laid down	Launched	Commissioned	Fleet	Status	Notes
Astrakhan	Almaz Shipyard, St. Petersburg	30 January 2004	7 October 2005	1 September 2006	Caspian	Active	
Volgodonsk	Almaz Shipyard, St. Petersburg	25 February 2005	6 May 2011	28 December 2011	Caspian	Active	Acceptance act signed 20 December 2011, commissioned 28 December, entered service July 2012.
Makhachkala	Almaz Shipyard, St. Petersburg	24 March 2006	27 April 2012	4 December 2012	Caspian	Active	

== Gallery ==
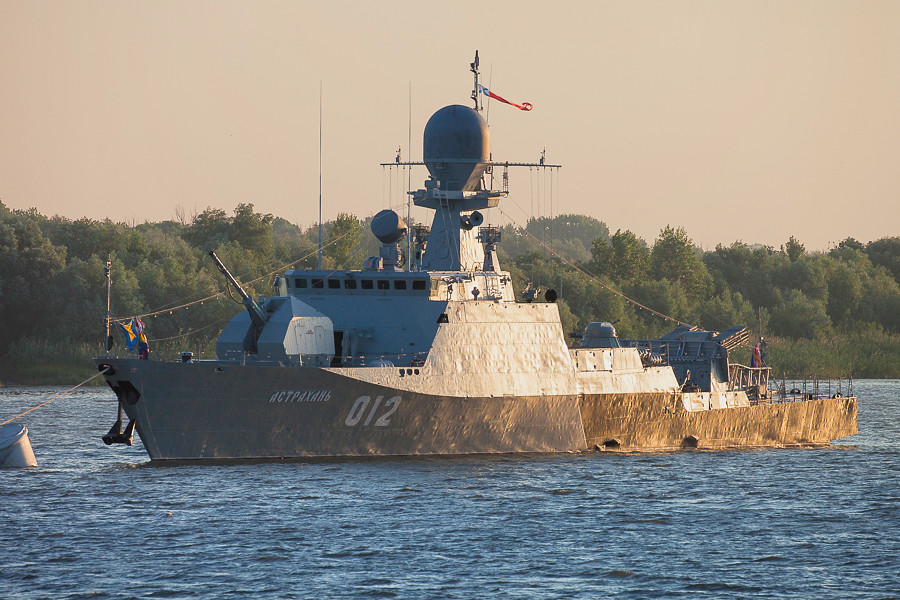
Buyan-class ship "Astrakhan"

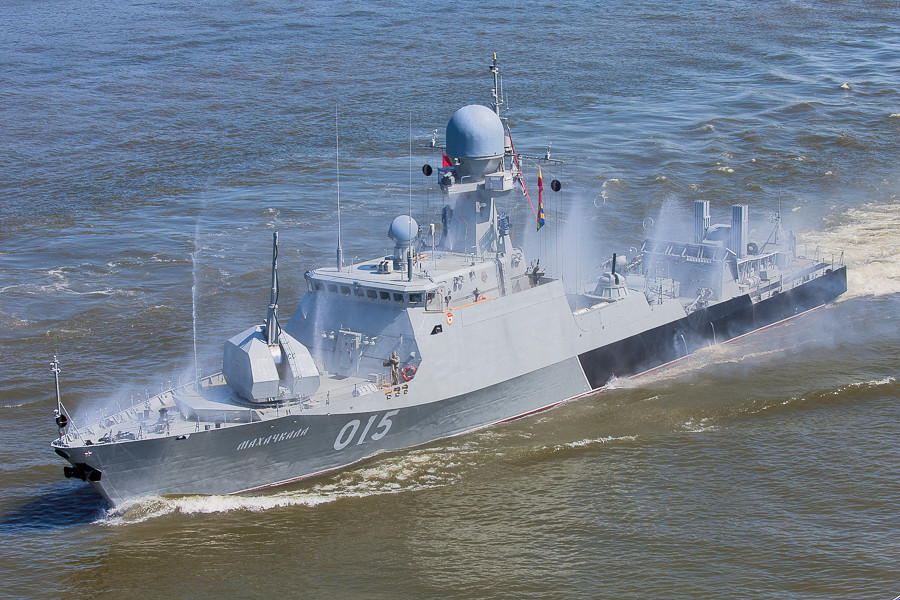
The Buyan-class ship "Makhachkala

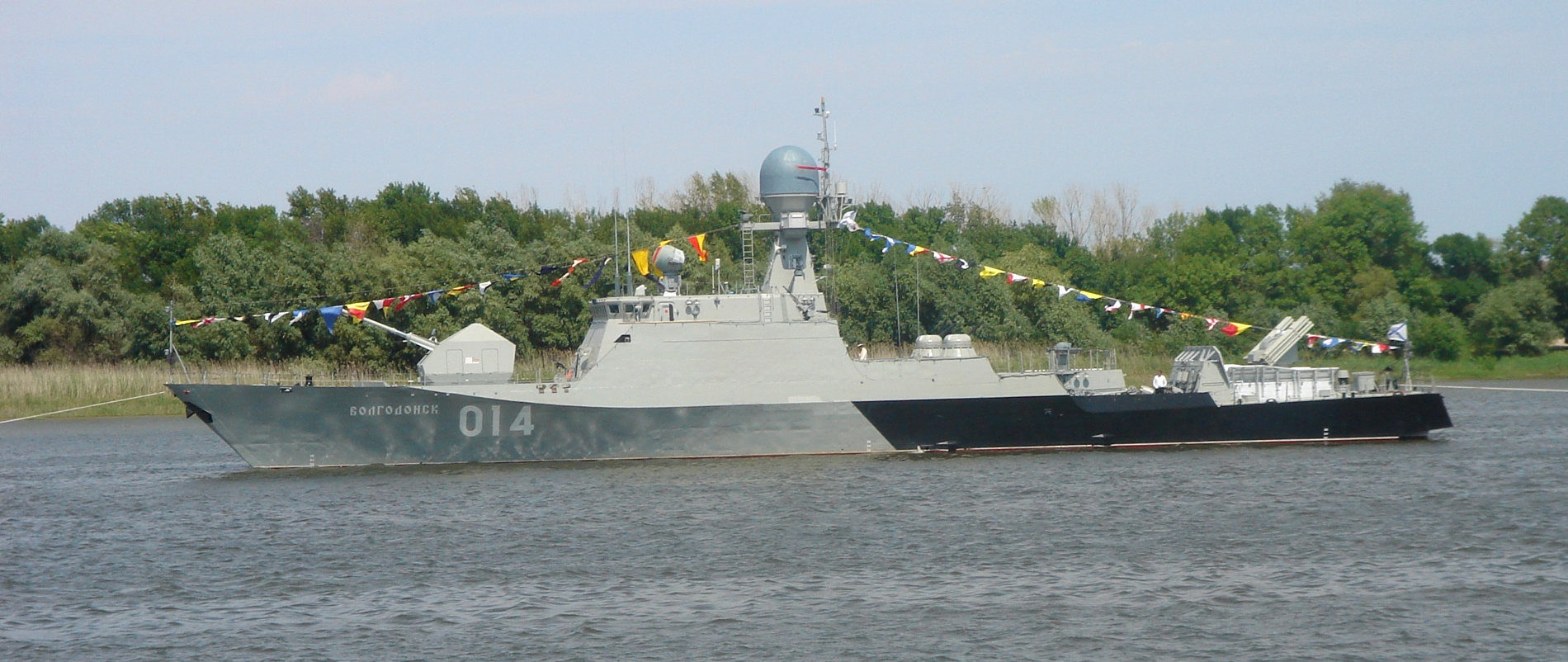
Buyan-class ship "Volgodonsk"

== See also ==
- List of ships of the Soviet Navy
- List of ships of Russia by project number
- Rubin-class patrol boat

Equivalent modern corvettes

- Visby-class – (Sweden)
- Tuo Chiang-class – (Taiwan)
