= Russian corvette Zeleny Dol =

Buyan-M-class corvette

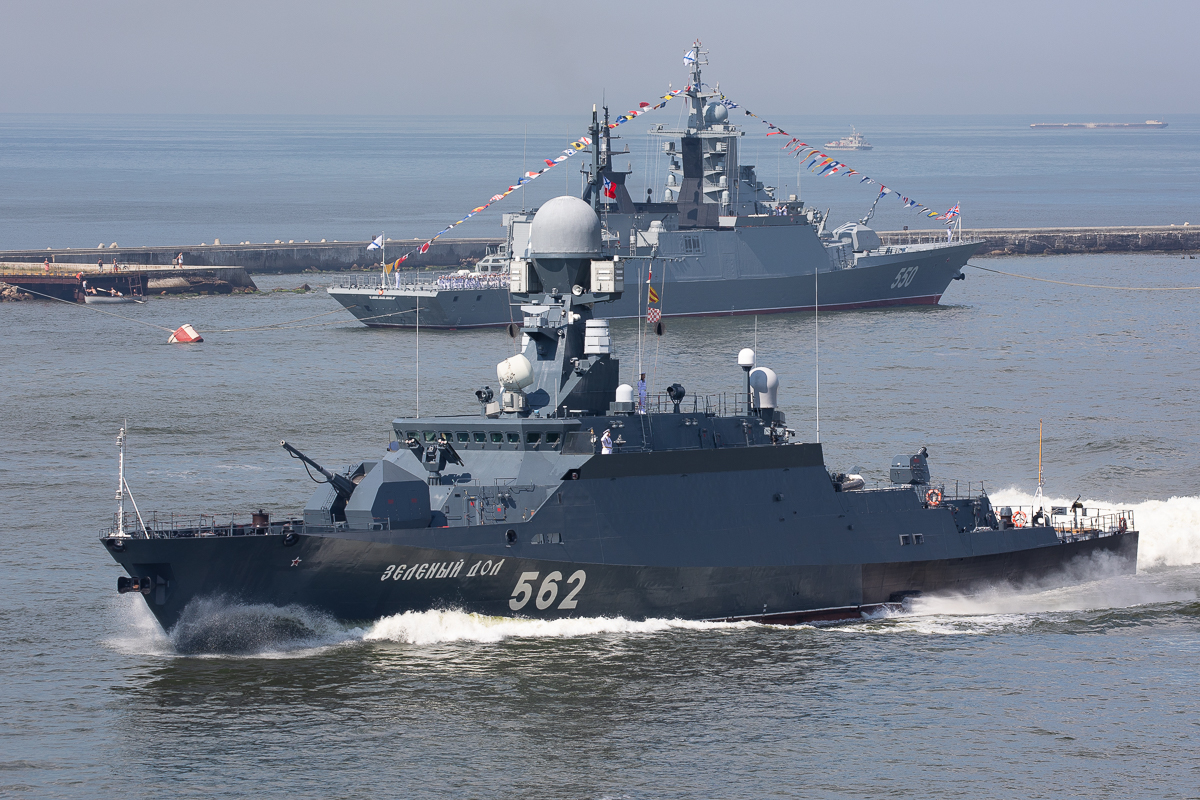
Zeleny Dol on Navy Day

(MRK 562) Zeleny Dol is a Buyan-M-class corvette in service with the Russian Navy.

== History ==
It was laid down on 29 August 2012.

It was launched on 2 April 2015.

It was commissioned on 12 December 2015.

In 2016 Zeleny Dol was deployed to the Mediterranean Sea, later followed by sister ship Serpukhov. On 19 August Zeleny Dol and Serpukhov, deployed in the Mediterranean Sea, launched Kalibr cruise missiles at positions of Al-Nusra terrorist group in Syria. As a result of the strikes, number of terrorist facilities were destroyed, including command post and base near the village of Dar Ta Izzah and weapon production plants and warehouses in Aleppo province.

On 25 October 2016, Zeleny Dol and Serpukhov were deployed to the Baltic Sea to join a newly formed division at Kaliningrad. In 2020, Zeleny Dol and the Karakurt-class corvette Odintsovo deployed to Arctic waters utilizing Russian internal waterways.
