= Russian corvette Vyshniy Volochyok =

Russian Buyan-M-class corvette

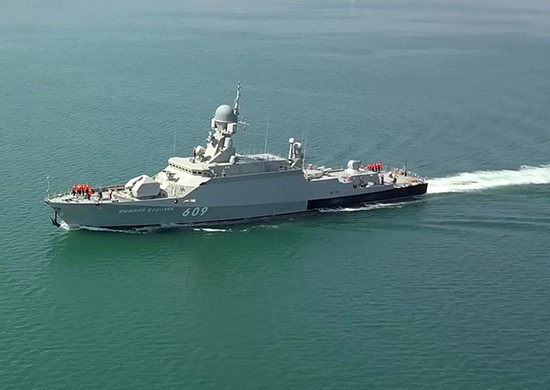
Vyshniy Volochyok

(MRK 609) Vyshniy Volochyok is a Buyan-M-class corvette in service with the Russian Navy.

== History ==
=== Construction ===
It was laid down on 29 August 2013.

It was launched on 22 August 2016.

It was commissioned on 1 June 2018.

On 7 August 2025 the Vyshniy Volochyok collided with the Turkish owned—and Panama-flagged—tanker Nazan in Temryuk Bay. According to purportedly leaked Russian naval report (published on the Russian Telegram channel VChK-OGPU), the corvette was ordered to return to port at 03:59 after reportedly detecting multiple Ukrainian drones. Vyshniy Volochyok struck the tanker at 04:05, as alleged by the account. The report described damages to the corvette's hull and internal structures, and photographs released alongside it also showed structural deformations. The Russian Navy classified the incident as a "ship control accident" and stated that the ship remained operational even after the collision.
