= Temryuk (disambiguation) =

Temryuk is a town in Krasnodar Krai, Russia.

Temryuk may also refer to:

- Temryuk Bay, a bay of the Sea of Azov, Russia
- Temryuk of Kabardia, Christian Kabardian prince, father of Maria Temryukovna, second wife of Ivan the Terrible
- Mariya Temryuk-Cherkasova, maiden name of the mother of Igor Sikorsky, Russian-American aviation pioneer
