= Buyan-M-class corvette =

Russian series of small missile ships

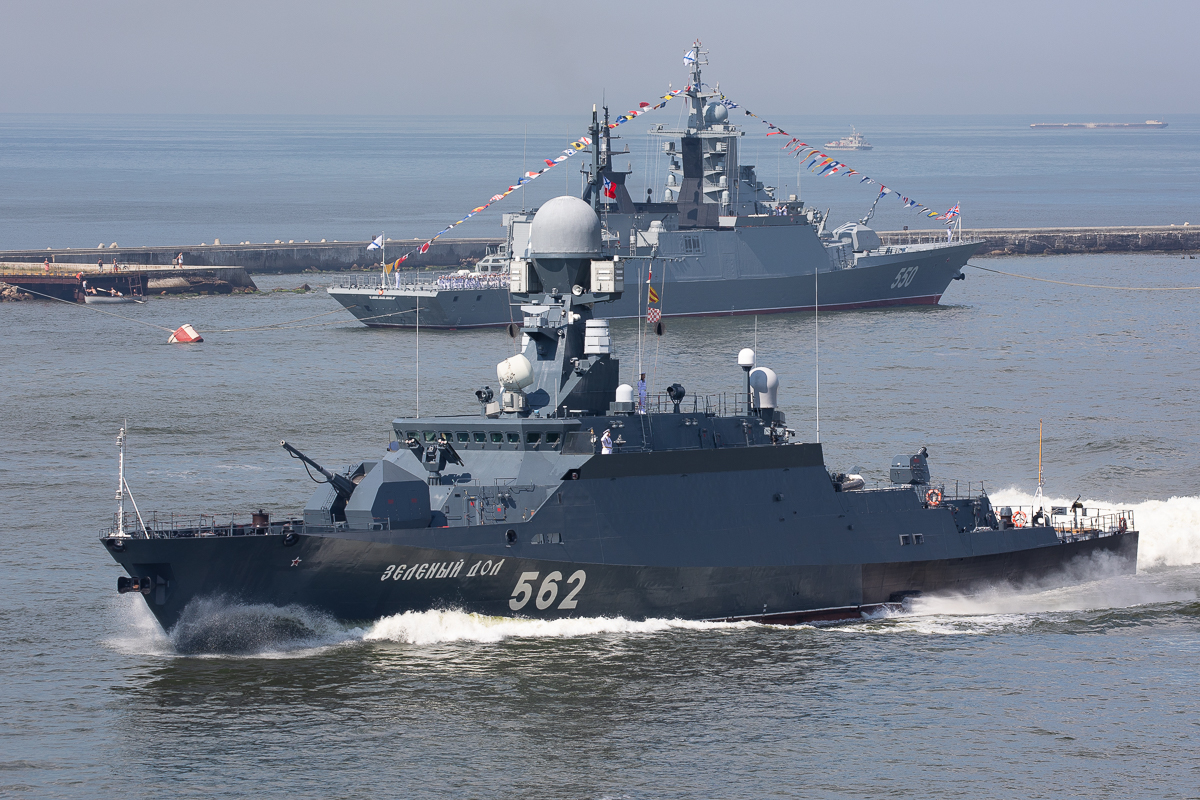
- The Zeleny Dol (foreground) on Navy Day

Class overview
- Name: Buyan-M class
- Builders: Zelenodolsk Plant Gorky
- Operators: Russian Navy
- Preceded by: Buyan class
- Succeeded by: Karakurt class
- Built: 2010–2025
- In commission: 2014–present
- Planned: 12
- Completed: 12
- Active: 12

General characteristics
- Type: Guided-missile corvette
- Displacement: 850 t (840 LT) (standard); 949 t (934 LT) (full)
- Length: 74.1 m (243 ft 1 in)
- Beam: 11 m (36 ft 1 in)
- Draft: 2.6 m (8 ft 6 in)
- Installed power: 631–635 (Note: Numbers refer to yard numbers at the shipbuilding plant, see § Ships): 4 × 2,800 kW (3,700 hp) MTU 16V4000M90 diesel engines; 636–639: 4 × 2,941 kW (3,944 hp) CHD622V20 diesel engines; 640–642: Kolomna 16D49 diesel engines
- Propulsion: 2 Pumpjets
- Speed: 25 knots (46 km/h; 29 mph)
- Range: 2,500 nmi (4,600 km; 2,900 mi) at 12 knots (22 km/h; 14 mph)
- Endurance: 10 days
- Complement: Up to 52
- Sensors & processing systems: 5P-26 Pozitiv air/surface-search radar; MR-231 navigation radar; MG-757 Anapa-M anti-saboteur sonar system; 3R14N fire-control system; 5P-10-03 Laska fire control system
- Electronic warfare & decoys: PK-10 Smely decoy system
- Armament: 1 × 100 mm A-190-01 naval gun; 1 × 30 mm AK-630M2 "Duet" CIWS; 1 × 8 3S-14 VLS cells for Kalibr or Oniks cruise missiles; 2 Gibka-R systems, carrying Igla-type missiles; 2 × 14.5 mm MTPU machine gun

The Buyan-M class, Russian designation Project 21631 Buyan-M (Russian: Буян-М, lit. 'Buyan-M'), is a series of corvettes (small missile ships by Russian classification) in service with the Russian Navy. The class was designed by the Zelenodolsk Design Bureau and ships were built by the Zelenodolsk Shipyard in Tatarstan.

The Buyan-M class is an updated version of the earlier Project 21630 Buyan-class corvettes. They are designed primarily for littoral operations and can operate in Russia's inland waterway system. The corvettes' primary armament is the 3S-14 vertical launching system used to launch up to eight Kalibr or Oniks cruise missiles. The Buyan-M-class corvettes are also equipped with short-range surface-to-air missiles and artillery.

Construction began in 2010, and twelve ships were built in total. The lead ship, Grad Sviyazhsk, was commissioned in 2014 and the final ship, Stavropol, was commissioned in 2025. Ships of the class serve in the Caspian Flotilla and the Baltic and Black Sea fleets, and have transferred between the respective seas via internal waterways. Buyan-M-class corvettes have see service during Russia's intervention in the Syrian Civil War and the Russo-Ukrainian war, conducting cruise missile strikes in both conflicts. A 2015 Kalibr strike against Syria involving Buyan-M-class corvettes marked the first combat use of Kalibr. Several ships have reportedly been damaged during the war in Ukraine.

== Characteristics ==
=== Structure ===
The Project 21631 ships are significantly larger than the original Buyan class, with a full-load displacement of 949 metric tons (934 long tons) compared to 560 t (550 LT). Ships of the class have a length of 74.1 meters (243 ft) rather than 62 m (203 ft) on the original Buyan. The Buyan-M-class corvettes also have a beam of 11 m (36 ft) and a draft of 2.6 m (8 ft 6 in), and a reported standard displacement of 850 t (840 LT). Ships of the class have a complement of up to 52 persons.

The corvettes' hull design incorporates signature-reduction measures. Due to their shallow draft and small dimensions, Buyan-M-class corvettes can operate in Russia's inland waterways (including passing through canal locks and under bridges). The interconnected rivers and canals of Russia's inland waterway system provide routes between the Caspian, Baltic, White and Black seas, and Russia has used this capability to transfer Buyan-M-class corvettes between Russian bodies of water. Naval analyst Helge Adrians argued that Russia's deployment of long-range strike missiles aboard ships in inland waterways added to their strategic importance beyond being used as transport routes.

The Buyan-M class' successor (complement), the Karakurt class, was designed for optimized operations at sea, contrasting the former class' shallow-water optimization.

=== Propulsion ===
Each ship of the Buyan-M class is equipped with diesel engines driving two water jets for propulsion. The first five ships of this class (Note: Grad Sviyazhsk, Uglich, Velikiy Ustug, Zelenyy Dol, and Serpukhov) each use four German MTU 16V4000M90 diesel engines and ZF gearboxes. However, after the beginning of the Russo-Ukrainian war, MTU engines became unavailable due to sanctions imposed on Russia. Zelenodolsk shipyard director Renat Mistakhov said in 2015 that the sixth ship (Vyshniy Volochyok) would receive Russian engines. Instead, the next four ships (Note: Vyshniy Volochyok, Orekhovo-Zuyevo, Ingushetiya, and Grayvoron) were each fitted with four CHD622V20 diesel engines produced by the Chinese company HND.

Later, as part of Russia's drive to replace imported goods with domestic ones, and also because of reported unreliability of the Chinese engines, the final three ships (Note: Grad, Naro-Fominsk, and Stavropol) of the class received Russian-made 16D49 diesel engines. The engines were made by Kolomna Locomotive Works. The final corvettes also feature gearboxes made by Zvezda, and control systems supplied by NPO Avrora. The Buyan-M class has a reported maximum speed of 25 knots (46 km/h; 29 mph) and a range of 2,500 nmi (4,600 km; 2,900 mi) at 12 knots (22 km/h; 14 mph). They also have an endurance of ten days.

=== Armament ===
==== Main armament ====
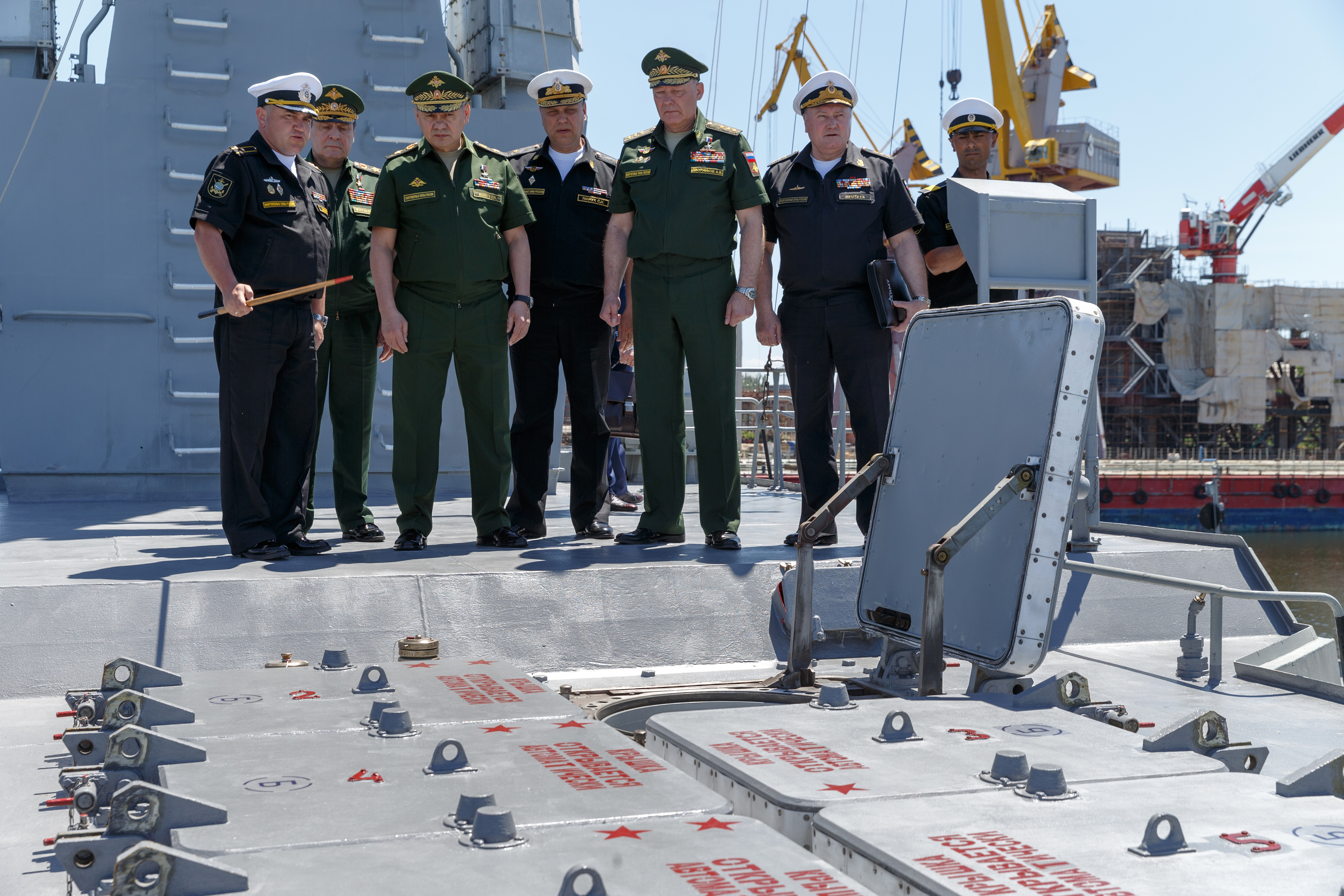
Sergey Shoigu inspecting the 3S-14 on Grad Sviyazhsk

Whereas the original Buyan-class ships are fitted with an A-215 Grad multiple rocket launcher, Buyan-M units carry an eight-cell 3S-14 vertical launching system. The 3S-14 used on the Buyan-M class is intended to carry up to eight Kalibr or Oniks cruise missiles. The 3M-14 variant of the Kalibr is used for land-attack, while the 3M-54 Kalibr and Oniks can be used for anti-ship missions, with the latter having supersonic capability. Until its termination in 2019, the Intermediate-Range Nuclear Forces Treaty prohibited its parties from possessing ground-launched ballistic and cruise missiles with ranges of 500–5,500 kilometers (310–3,420 mi), but did not restrict sea-launched missiles. The deployment of Kalibr land-attack cruise missiles aboard river-capable Buyan-M corvettes therefore provided Russia with a long-range strike capability not subject to these restrictions. Following a reported eight-missile Kalibr salvo by a Buyan-M-class corvette in 2022, Dmitry Litovkin of the Nezavisimoye Voyennoye Obozreniye argued that the launch demonstrated a Kalibr-carrying ship's capability to expend its entire missile load while remaining operational.

==== Air defense and artillery ====
Serpukhov (background), with A-190 and Gibka-R visible forward of the bridge

Buyan-M-class corvettes also carry two Gibka-R surface-to-air missile turrets. Janes and USNI's Proceedings describe the turrets used on the Buyan-M class as the Komar. According to RATEP—the Gibka-R's manufacturer—Komar was the name of the development program that led to production of the Gibka-R. The Gibka-R systems on ships of the class are armed with short-range missiles of the Igla family.

Published accounts of the Gibka-R/Komar system give several launcher configurations. Rosoboronexport describes the Komar as being able to carry four or eight "Igla-type" missiles. Missilery says that the Komar can be fitted with one to four universal launch modules each carrying two Igla-type missiles. KBM identifies the modules as "Strelets", and the company states that they are used on Gibka-R (Komar) turrets. Russianships.info specifies two six-round Gibka launchers for the Buyan-M class.

Ships of the class have several artillery installations. The main gun is the A-190-01 100 mm naval gun. Other smaller caliber weapons include the AK-630M2 "Duet" and a pair of MTPU machine gun mounts. The "Duet" consists of two AO-18 rotary cannons mounted one above the other and is used as a close-in weapon system against short range targets. In 2024, naval analyst Tomasz Grotnik identified the Buyan-M class' air defense as its primary weakness. Although it was rumored that the final ships of the class would receive Pantsir-M CIWS systems as seen on some Karakurt-class corvettes, they retained the existing armament.

KT-216 launcher (foreground) used for the PK-10 countermeasure system, displayed at Patriot Park

=== Sensors and countermeasures ===
Buyan-M-class corvettes carry a Pozitiv air- and surface-search radar, as well as a MR-231 navigational radar. They are also equipped with a MG-757 Anapa-M anti-saboteur sonar, a 3R-14N fire-control system for the Kalibr missiles, and a 5P-10-03 Laska fire-control system for the 100 mm gun. Countermeasures include the PK-10 Smely decoy system.

== Development and construction ==
The Buyan-M project was developed by the Zelenodolsk Design Bureau for the Russian Navy. Ships of the class were built by the JSC Zelenodolsk Shipyard in Tatarstan. The Buyan-M class is an updated missile-carrying variant of the earlier Buyan-class artillery ships. These corvettes are intended to protect Russia's exclusive economic zone.

Commissioning ceremony aboard Vyshniy Volochyok, the sixth ship of the class

Initial plans reported in 2010 called for 8–10 ships of the class to serve with the Caspian Flotilla and the Black Sea Fleet. By 2015, the planned total comprised nine ships, with three intended for the Caspian Flotilla and six for the Black Sea Fleet. On 7 September 2016, the Russian Ministry of Defense contracted for three additional ships, bringing the planned total to 12. Ultimately, all 12 ships of the class were built. The final three were assigned to the Baltic Fleet, which also received two ships—Serpukhov and Zeleny Dol—transferred from the Black Sea Fleet.

Grad Sviyazhsk, the lead ship, was laid down on 27 August 2010. Its acceptance act was signed in December 2013, and its flag was raised on 27 July 2014. The construction continued up until 2025, when the final ship, Stavropol, was commissioned on 28 August.

Russianships.info reports a ship of the Buyan-M-class planned to be built at the Almaz Shipbuilding Company, listing it as "not completed".

== Operations in Syria ==
Buyan-M-class corvettes, alongside other Russian Navy ships, fired Kalibr cruise missiles in several operations during Russian operations in Syria, marking the first known combat use of the Kalibr missile system. The operations demonstrated the long-range land-attack capability available to relatively small Russian warships. Buyan-M ships subsequently served on rotation in Russia's Mediterranean Sea Task Force, including deployments near the Syrian coast.

=== October 2015 ===
Russian Ministry of Defense footage of cruise-missile launches from the Caspian Sea, released in October 2015.

On 7 October 2015, the Caspian Flotilla's Buyan-M-class corvettes Grad Sviyazhsk, Uglich, and Velikiy Ustyug participated in a missile strike against Syria along with the Gepard-class frigate Dagestan (the strike group's reported flagship). The four ships launched a total of 26 Kalibr missiles (Note: 3M-14T land-attack variant) at 11 targets in the Raqqa, Aleppo, and Idlib governorates of Syria. The missiles reportedly travelled approximately 1,500 kilometers (930 miles) across Iranian and Iraqi airspace to reach Syria. According to the Russian Ministry of Defense, the missiles were launched overnight from the southwestern Caspian Sea. According to accounts reported by Reuters, the targets included command posts, weapons and ammunition depots, fuel depots, bomb-making facilities, and training camps. Russian Minister of Defense Sergei Shoigu said that all 11 targets had been destroyed, with no damage to civilian installations or civilian casualties. The missile strike occurred as Syrian government forces began a ground offensive that was supported by Russian airstrikes.

This operation marked the first combat usage of Kalibr. USNI described the operation as a demonstration of Russia's ability to conduct long-range naval land attacks while also noting the limitations of older Russian surface ships; ships of the Black Sea Fleet then operating much closer to Syria lacked equivalent land-attack capability. BBC defense correspondent Jonathan Marcus said that Russia's rationale behind its choice of a naval cruise missile strike instead of an airstrike was unclear. He suggested that the strike may have been intended to demonstrate Russia's ability to conduct long-range naval strikes similar to those commonly carried out by the U.S. during overseas interventions. Commander of NORTHCOM William E. Gortney also said that Russia was messaging the U.S. and demonstrating its capability.

On 8 October, reports—citing unnamed U.S. defense officials—said that four of the fired missiles had crashed in Iran before reaching Syria. Russia denied the allegations, claiming that all 26 missiles had hit their targets. According to Iran's Fars News Agency, the Iranian defense ministry also rejected the reports, describing them as "psychological warfare". The Guardian reported that Pentagon and State Department officials declined to comment. The Russian Ministry of Defense released videos that it said showed targets struck by the missiles, but the footage did not include time or location information.

Footage published by the Russian Ministry of Defense showing ships of the strike group launching Kalibr missiles from the Caspian Sea

=== November 2015 ===
On 20 November 2015, the same ships—Grad Sviyazhsk, Uglich, Velikiy Ustyug, and Dagestan—launched Kalibr cruise missiles from the Caspian Sea. The ships launched a total of 18 cruise missiles at seven targets in Syria, which, according to Sergei Shoigu, were in the same governorates as the previous strike (Raqqa, Aleppo, and Idlib). Caspian Flotilla deputy commander Captain 1st rank Sergei Yekimov stated that all 18 missiles had been successfully launched and that the results would be reported after assessment data was received. Shoigu stated that all seven targets were hit.

=== 2016 ===
On 13 February 2016, the Black Sea Fleet announced that the Buyan-M-class ship Zeleny Dol had departed for the Mediterranean, armed with Kalibr missiles. RIA Novosti quoted a security source which identified Syria as the ship's destination and suggested that it could participate in Russia's military campaign there. Zeleny Dol and Serpukhov then fired a combined total of three Kalibr missiles from the eastern Mediterranean at Syria on 19 August.

Russia's Ministry of Defense identified the targets as facilities belonging to Jabhat al-Nusra, which had renamed itself Jabhat Fatah Al-Sham. The ministry stated that the targets included a command facility and a camp near Dar Ta Izzah. The Associated Press reported the Russian MoD's claim that a mine-making facility and a weapons facility were also among the targets, while other sources reported the ministry's description of a mortar-ammunition manufacturing plant and a warehouse. The MoD said that the missiles' route was planned over unpopulated areas of Syria to avoid civilian casualties. The ministry announced that all targets had been destroyed, and also released footage of the launches and purported target destruction, together with UAV footage presented as battle-damage assessment.

After the missile launches, both corvettes returned to their homeport of Sevastopol. Russia announced in October that Zeleny Dol and Serpukhov would return to the Mediterranean. Interfax subsequently reported that they would join Admiral Kuznetsov's group. However, the corvettes' northbound movements gave rise to suspicions that Zeleny Dol and Serpukhov were instead heading for the Baltic Sea. By 26 October, both corvettes had entered the Baltic Sea, and the presence was confirmed by ship spotters, NATO, and the Swedish military. Russian media reported that they would join the Baltic Fleet, and both corvettes transferred to the Baltic Fleet in October 2016.

=== 2018 ===
In June 2018, Grad Sviyazhsk and Velikiy Ustyug sailed from the Caspian Sea to the Mediterranean through Russia's inland waterways and the Turkish Straits. According to the Eurasian Research Institute, the corvettes passed through the Bosphorus on the 16th and joined the Mediterranean task force on the 17th. During the deployment, Grad Sviyazhsk and Velikiy Ustyug operated with Russia's naval group near Tartus and participated in exercises near the Syrian Coast, including the joint Russian Navy and Aerospace Forces exercise in the Mediterranean in early September 2018. The exercise was announced for 1–8 September, a time of heightened Russian-Western tensions concerning Syria. According to the Southern Military District's account of the event, the ships practiced combat both independently and within a naval group, and conducted artillery firing against air and surface targets. The two corvettes returned to Astrakhan on 16 October 2018. The Southern Military District stated that the deployment was the two ships' first voyage from the Caspian to the Mediterranean, and that they had been away from their homeport for five months.

=== Later rotations ===
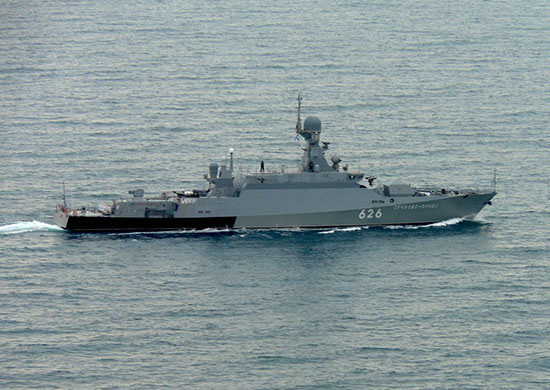
Orekhovo-Zuyevo at sea

Buyan-M-class corvettes continued to serve in the Mediterranean region, joining the permanent task force in rotations. According to Russian state reports, Orekhovo-Zuyevo served starting March 2019, and Uglich and Velikiy Ustyug were in the Mediterranean until mid-October. Orekhovo-Zuyevo was reportedly transiting the Turkish Straits to join the Mediterranean task force in April 2020. In 2021, it was reported that Ingushetia had served in the Mediterranean for nearly four months before returning to Crimea. Vyshny Volochyok reportedly began Mediterranean service in October 2021, and the Black Sea Fleet announced that Orekhovo-Zuyevo would replace it in January 2022. Orekhovo-Zuyevo was listed as serving with the task force in February 2024.

== Operations in Ukraine ==
Buyan-M-class corvettes participated in the Russo-Ukrainian war as Kalibr cruise-missile carriers. In March 2022, a Buyan-M was reported to have launched all eight of its Kalibr missiles in succession. Ukrainian forces also targeted Buyan-M corvettes during the war, including through sabotage and drone attacks. Several Buyan-M-class corvettes have reportedly been damaged during the war.

=== Pre-2022 ===
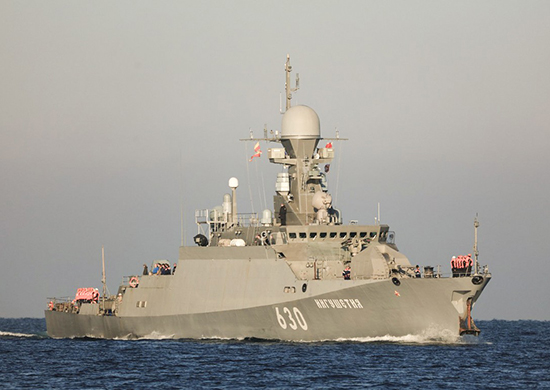
Ingushetia at sea in 2021

A Russian Ministry of Defense news outlet reported that Ingushetia was involved in exercises rehearsing the defense of Crimea in late October 2021. According to the reports, which were carried by the Jamestown Foundation, Ingushetia provided naval fire support alongside the cruiser Moskva, frigate Admiral Grigorovich and several missile boats. The exercise reportedly included suppression of simulated enemy coastal defenses and an amphibious assault supported by aircraft.

=== March 2022 strike ===
Footage published by the Russian Ministry of Defense showing a Buyan-M of the Black Sea Fleet launching four missiles, reportedly Kalibrs

On 22 March 2022, a Buyan-M class corvette of the Black Sea Fleet reportedly fired all eight of its 3M-14 Kalibr missiles at Ukraine. Several videos were released at the time, which The Washington Post suggested were of the Buyan-M strike. Civilian footage showed at least four missiles being fired from the water near Sevastopol, a Russian MoD video showed four explosions above a ship, and a civilian video of eight flares with long trails in the sky appeared to show the eight fired missiles. Although footage did not establish the missile type, Center for Strategic and International Studies deputy director Ian Williams said that he was "nearly positive" that the missiles shown in the videos were 3M-14 Kalibrs. According to the Russian MoD, the missiles hit their targets and destroyed a large Ukrainian weapons depot at Orzhev. U.S. officials could not confirm the use of the missiles, and Ukrainian officials did not corroborate the missile strike or the results.

=== Incidents ===
==== 2022–2024 ====
In mid-June 2022, a photo emerged on an online forum showing a Buyan-M-class corvette being towed on the Volga River in a damaged state. Militarnyi said that the ship was likely the Velikiy Ustyug, even though the ship's name and hull number were painted over. Militarnyi attributed the damage to a Ukrainian attack, but also said that it is unknown how and when the ship was damaged. It suggested that the corvette was likely being taken to the Zelenodolsk Shipyard for repairs.

The Security Service of Ukraine (SBU) and the Ukrainian Navy said that they attacked a Buyan-M-class corvette (Note: The vessel is variously identified as "Buyan" and "Buyan-M" in the reports; "missile carrier" is used to describe it.) near Sevastopol on 13 October 2023. The SBU said that the attack was carried out using a Sea Baby unmanned surface vehicle with "experimental weapons". The SBU stated that it had damaged the ship, but did not identify the specific ship or provide further details. Ukrainian officials also reported that a Sea Baby had damaged the Project 22160-class patrol ship Pavel Derzhavin.

Ukrainian military intelligence released a video on 8 April 2024 in which it said that it had started a fire onboard Serpukhov. The fire, however, reportedly occurred on 7 April. Serpukhov was in harbor at Baltiysk, Kaliningrad Oblast. Ukrainian military intelligence said that the fire destroyed "its communication and automation systems." On 3 July 2024, the Defense Intelligence of Ukraine (HUR) released details of Operation "Rybalka" ("Fisherman"), which involved a former Russian sailor (reported callsign "Goga") setting fire to Serpukhov on 7 April. According to the HUR account, he also stole data "about the Baltic Fleet and the Russian military industry." The former sailor joined the Freedom of Russia Legion after defecting. HUR estimated Serpukhov would be out of action for six months. Ukraine said that the ship was targeted for its ability to fire Kalibr and Onyx missiles. The Barents Observer reported that Serpukhov was active again in mid-2025.

==== 2025 ====
On 7 August 2025 the Vyshniy Volochyok collided with the Turkish owned—and Panama-flagged—tanker Nazan in Temryuk Bay. According to a reportedly leaked Russian naval report (published on the Russian Telegram channel VChK-OGPU), the corvette was ordered to return to port at 03:59 after reportedly detecting multiple Ukrainian drones. Vyshniy Volochyok struck the tanker at 04:05, as stated by the account. The report described damages to the corvette's hull and internal structures, and photographs released alongside it also showed structural deformations. The Russian Navy classified the incident as a "ship control accident" and considered the ship operational even after the collision.

The HUR said it had struck a Buyan-M-class corvette in the Sea of Azov near Crimea on 28 August 2025. According to reports, the corvette was in Temryuk Bay and within range of launching Kalibr missiles at Ukrainian territory. HUR released footage of a drone attack on a Buyan-M's radar and main hull, which it said showed the 28 August attack. HUR said that the corvette sustained significant damage from the attack. It said that the attack prevented a planned Kalibr strike and caused the corvette to withdraw from its "combat-duty area".

On 4 October 2025, the Ukrainian Special Forces (SSO) reported that it had struck Grad on Lake Onega. The SSO said that the attack occurred at 04:31 local time, while Grad was sailing from the Baltic Sea to the Caspian Sea (far from Ukraine). It reported a hit to the starboard side of the ship's power-plant compartment, but further assessments were unavailable at the time of the initial report. A Russian Ministry of Defense report, (carried by PortNews in a 14 a May 2026 release) said that the Grad was active and had completed artillery firings in the Baltic Sea, not mentioning the attack. Later, on 27 May, Ukraine released a video of the strike. The video shows a fire amidships on the corvette as well as Russian sailors jumping overboard. In a release publishing the video, Militarnyi reported that drones were used for the attack, and described Grad as destroyed.

==== 2026 ====
Ukrainian forces conducted a drone and missile strike on the Russian Port of Novorossiysk on 9 September 2026. Ukraine said it had struck a Buyan-M-class corvette, along with the Admiral Grigorovich-class frigates Admiral Essen and Admiral Makarov. The strike was reportedly the first instance of a Long Neptune (the missile used for the attack) missile being used to strike a ship. Satellite imagery provided by Exilenova+ showed damage to the Buyan-M as well as other ships.

The SBU said that it and other Ukrainian defense forces struck the Naro-Fominsk with drones. The attack occurred overnight into 11 November 2026, during a wider strike directed at Russia's Leningrad Oblast. The attack reportedly took place near Gogland in the Gulf of Finland. According to a Russian Telegram channel cited by The Insider, Naro-Fominsk subsequently headed toward Kronstadt under its own power; the extent of damage was unknown. An escort vessel reportedly arrived to assist the ship in returning to St. Petersburg after Naro-Fominsk stalled.

Finnish authorities confirmed that a Russian naval vessel had been struck in the Gulf of Finland. Estonian Defense Minister Martin Herem said that the EDF observed an explosion aboard a Russian Baltic Fleet vessel at approximately 05:30, followed by smoke and the ship's departure toward Saint Petersburg. Possible casualties were reported, but the exact number remains unclear. According to Defense Express, the attack was the first instance of Ukrainian strike on a Russian warship at sea in the Baltic region. Previous attacks had targeted ships in port.

== Ships ==
Hull numbers and yard numbers from Russianships.info.

Name	Builder	Yard number	Hull number	Laid down	Launched	Commissioned	Fleet	Status/notes
Unknown	Almaz Shipyard	801						Not completed
Grad Sviyazhsk	Zelenodolsk Shipyard	631	652	27 August 2010	9 March 2013	27 July 2014	Caspian	Active, acceptance act signed in Devember 2013, flag raised 27 July 2014
Uglich	Zelenodolsk Shipyard	632	653	22 July 2011	10 April 2013	27 July 2014	Caspian	Active, acceptance act signed in Devember 2013, flag raised 27 July 2014
Velikiy Ustyug	Zelenodolsk Shipyard	633	651	27 August 2011	21 May 2014	19 December 2014	Caspian	Active,
Zeleny Dol	Zelenodolsk Shipyard	634	562	29 August 2012	2 April 2015	12 December 2015	Baltic	Active, originally served in the Black Sea Fleet until 1 November 2016
Serpukhov	Zelenodolsk Shipyard	635	563	25 January 2013	3 April 2015	12 December 2015	Baltic	Active; originally served in the Black Sea Fleet until 1 November 2016; reportedly damaged by sabotage in 2024; participating in exercises in the Baltic as of 2025
Vyshniy Volochyok	Zelenodolsk Shipyard	636	609	29 August 2013	22 August 2016	1 June 2018	Black Sea	Damaged in collision with civilian tanker August 2025, reportedly unaffected and remained operational
Orekhovo-Zuyevo	Zelenodolsk Shipyard	637	626	29 May 2014	19 June 2018	10 December 2018	Black Sea	Active; reportedly operating in the Mediterranean region as of May 2024
Ingushetiya	Zelenodolsk Shipyard	638	630	29 August 2014	11 June 2019	28 December 2019	Black Sea	Active
Grayvoron	Zelenodolsk Shipyard	639	600	10 April 2015	April 2020	30 January 2021	Black Sea	Active
Grad	Zelenodolsk Shipyard	640	575	24 April 2017	17 September 2021	29 December 2022	Baltic	Active; reported struck by Ukrainian attack in October 2025; damage uncertain. As of May 2026, Ukraine claims destroyed, Russia claims active
Naro-Fominsk	Zelenodolsk Shipyard	641	595	23 February 2018	9 December 2022	25 December 2023	Baltic	Reportedly damaged near Gogland in November 2026.
Stavropol	Zelenodolsk Shipyard	642	555	12 July 2018	11 June 2024	28 August 2025	Baltic	Active

== See also ==
- List of active Russian Navy ships
- List of corvette classes in service

=== Ships of comparable role, configuration, and era ===
- Bora-class corvette – (Soviet Union)
- Karakurt-class corvette – (Russia)
- Tuo Chiang-class corvette – (Taiwan)
- Type 056 corvette – (China)
- Visby-class corvette – (Sweden)
