= Russian corvette Uglich =

Russian Buyan-M-class corvette

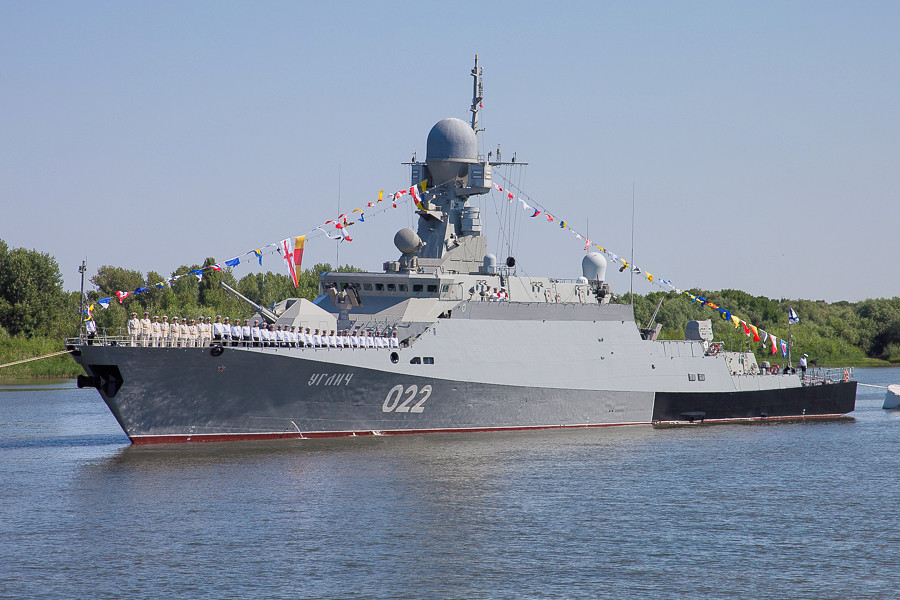
- Uglich in 2015

History

Russia
- Name: Uglich
- Namesake: Uglich
- Builder: Zelenodolsk Shipbuilding Plant, Tatarstan
- Laid down: 22 July 2011
- Launched: 10 April 2013
- Commissioned: 27 July 2014
- Home port: Mahachkala/Kaspiysk
- Identification: MRK 653 (previously 022)
- Status: In active service

General characteristics
- Type: Guided-missile corvette
- Displacement: 850 tonnes (840 LT) (standard); 949 tonnes (934 LT) (full)
- Length: 74.1–75 m (243–246 ft)
- Beam: 11 m (36 ft)
- Height: 6.57 m (21.6 ft)
- Draft: 2.5–2.6 m (8.2–8.5 ft)
- Installed power: 4 2,800 kW (3,700 hp) MTU 16V4000M90 diesel engines
- Propulsion: 2 Pumpjets
- Speed: 26 knots (48 km/h; 30 mph)
- Range: 2,500 nmi (4,600 km; 2,900 mi) at 12 knots (22 km/h; 14 mph)
- Endurance: unclear, sources state 10 days and 15 days
- Complement: 52
- Sensors & processing systems: 5P-26 Pozitiv air/surface-search radar; MR-231 navigation radar; MG-757 Anapa anti-saboteur sonar system; 3R14N fire control system; 5P-10-03 Laska fire control system
- Electronic warfare & decoys: PK-10 Smely decoy
- Armament: 1 × 100 mm A-190-01 naval gun; 1 30 mm AK-630-M2 CIWS; 1 × 8 3S-14 VLS cells for Kalibr or Oniks cruise missiles; 2 Gibka/Komar (Note: A 2015 Jane's report stated that Project 21631 corvettes were to be equipped with the Komar SAM turret. In a 2018 TV ForPost report aboard the corvette Vyshny Volochyok, a Russian Navy sailor referred to the ship's system as the Gibka. A 2021 Jane's report on the Rubin-class patrol boat Rasul Gamzatov described a similar naval launcher as possibly a derivative of the 3M-47 Gibka, a Komar, or a crossbreed of the two systems. The exact relationship between the Komar designation and the 3M-47 Gibka system is not consistently described in open sources.) systems, each equipped with 4-8 Igla MANPADS; 2 × 14.5 mm MTPU machine gun

MRK-022 Uglich (Russian: Углич) is a Buyan-M-class corvette of the Russian Navy's Caspian Flotilla, the second ship of her class. She was laid down on 22 July 2011, launched on 10 April 2013, and commissioned on 27 July 2014.

== History ==
=== Construction ===
Uglich was laid down 22 July 2011.

She was launched on 10 April 2013.

On 5 May 2014, Uglich and her sister ship Grad Sviyazhsk, along with other Caspian Flotilla ships, performed tactical exercises in the Caspian Sea.

Uglich was commissioned on 27 July 2014.

=== Deployment ===
In 2014, Grad Sviyazhsk and Uglich participated in an exercise involving the coastal Podsolnukh over-the-horizon surface wave (OTH-SW) radar.

On 7 October 2015, Uglich its sister ships Grad Sviyazhsk and Velikiy Ustyug, and Gepard-class frigate Dagestan, deployed in the Caspian Sea, launched 26 Kalibr cruise missiles at 11 targets in Syria. The missiles flew nearly 1,500 kilometres (930 mi)over Iran and Iraq and struck targets in Raqqa and Aleppo provinces (controlled by the Islamic State) as well as in Idlib province (controlled by the al-Qaeda-linked Nusra Front). According to United States Department of Defense officials, several of these cruise missiles fired from Russian ships crashed in Iran and did not make it to their intended targets in Syria.

On 20 November 2015, the same warships launched 18 Kalibr cruise missiles from the Caspian Sea at seven targets in Rakka, Idlib and Aleppo provinces.

From 13 to 17 July 2017, she conducted in a missile and artillery firing exercise along with sister ships Velikiy Ustug and Grad Sviyazhsk.

In late March– early April 2016, during exercises in bad weather conditions, Uglich reportedly carried out artillery firing on sea and air targets, repelled an attack by a simulated enemy, and evaded an air attack by means of electronic short-range countermeasures.

In late April 2016 Uglich, along with many other Caspian Flotilla ships, participated in an exercise. Among the weapons tested were the Kalibr system, A-190, and Duet CIWS.

From 4 July to 8 July, she took part in a Caspian flotilla training involving over 20 warships. The group conducted simulated Kalibr-NK operations without actual missile firings.

On 3 August 2016 Uglich participated in an international contest (Russian: Кубок Моря-2016, romanized: Kubok Morya-2016, lit. 'Sea Cup 2016'), involving artillery firings against sea and air targets. Uglich was the winner of the contest.

During the Caucasus-2016 (Russian: Кавказ-2016) exercise, Uglich struck a target imitating an enemy ship using its Kalibr-NK complex.

On 15 September 2016 the ship and many others from the Caspian Flotilla participated in an air defense exercise.

Uglich and a Caspian Flotilla group partook in an exercise involving the Podsolnukh radar, which assisted in tracking targets to be struck by missile and artillery armament.

Uglich and its sister ships Grad Sviyazhsk and Velikiy Ustug welcomed ships of the Iranian Navy on an unofficial visit to Makhachkala in March 2017.

On 25 April 2017, a squadron of ships including the Uglich set sail as part of a combat readiness test.

In May 2017, operating as part of a group of vessels, she participated in a naval deployment focused on security operations in the central and southern Caspian Sea. The group spent 30 days at sea, covering approximately 3,000 nautical miles (5,000 km).

From 13 to 17 July, Uglich conducted in a missile and artillery firing exercise along with sister ships Velikiy Ustug and Grad Sviyazhsk.

On 16 August 2017 she participated in air defense exercises of the Caspian Flotilla.

On 9 October 2017 she participated in a group artillery and missile firing exercise, ending the 2017 summer Caspian Flotilla combat readiness exercises.

== Commanders ==
- Captain 2nd rank Mikhail Stepanov

== Gallery ==
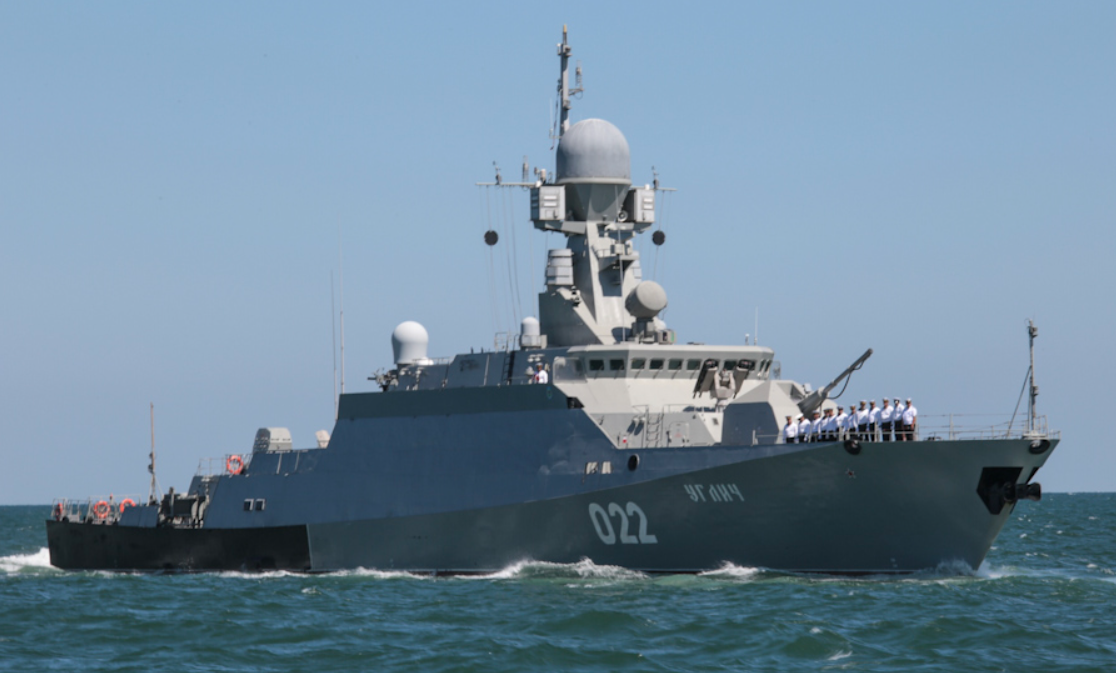
At sea in 2015

In Astrakhan
