= Naro-Fominsk =

Town in Moscow Oblast, Russia

Naro-Fominsk Наро-Фоминск
- Town
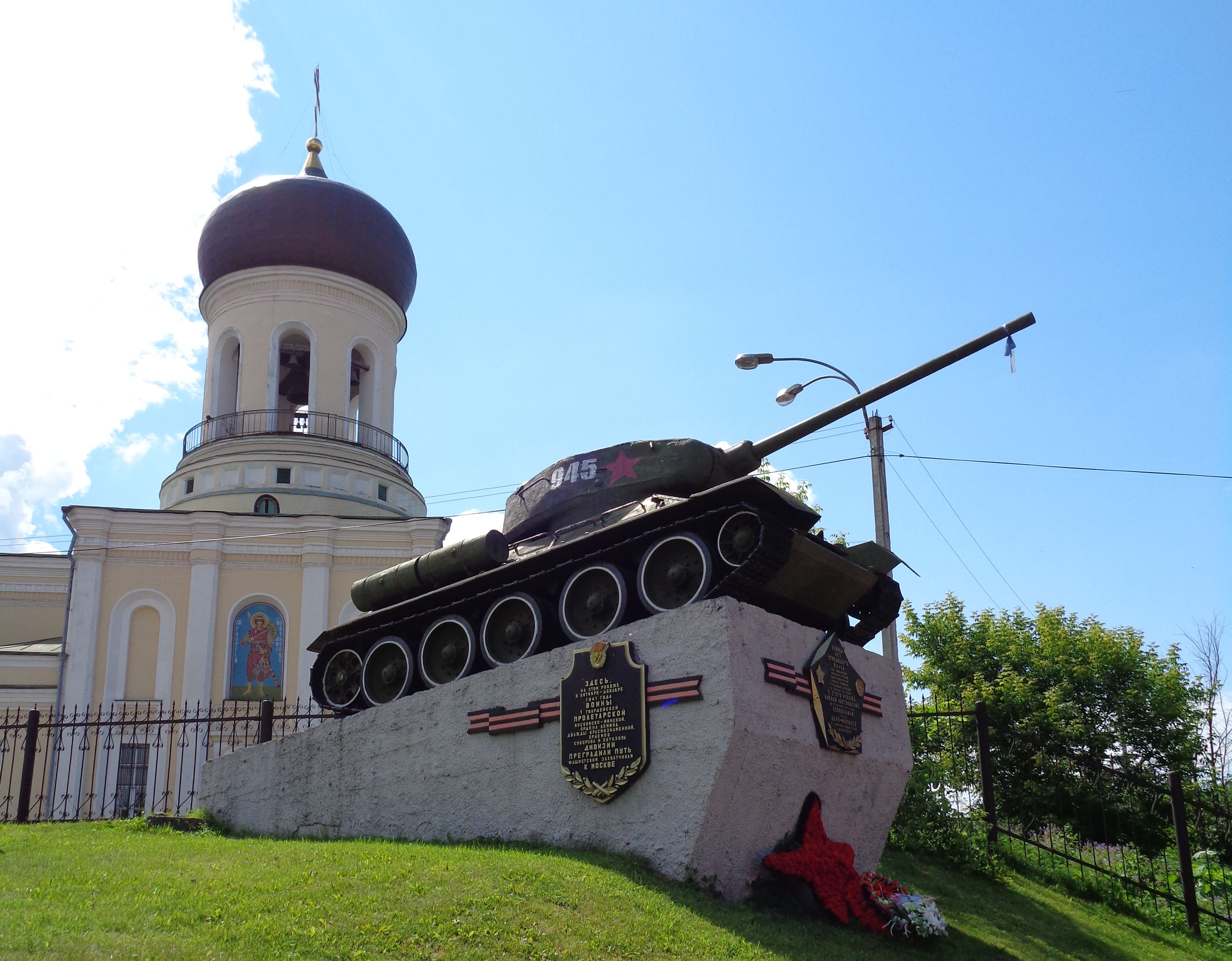
- Naro-Fominsk St. Nicholas Cathedral with T-34 gate guardian

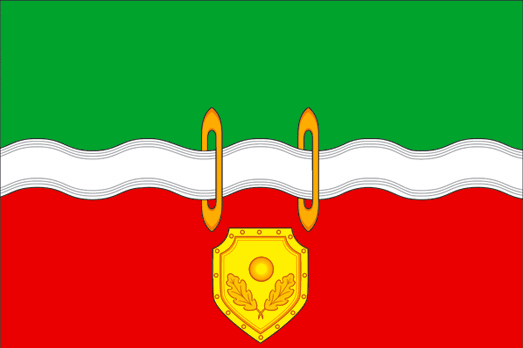
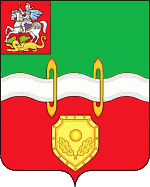
- Flag Coat of arms
- Interactive map of Naro-Fominsk
- Location of Naro-Fominsk Naro-Fominsk (Moscow Oblast)
- Coordinates: 55°23′N 36°46′E
- Country: Russia
- Federal subject: Moscow Oblast
- Administrative district: Naro-Fominsky District
- TownSelsoviet: Naro-Fominsk
- Founded: 1925
- Town status since: 1926

Government
  - Body: Council of Deputies
  - Head: Anatoly Shkurkov
- Elevation: 180 m (590 ft)

Population (2010 Census)
  - Total: 64,665
  - Estimate (2025): 76,191 (+17.8%)
  - Rank: 242nd in 2010

Administrative status
  - Capital of: Naro-Fominsky District, Town of Naro-Fominsk

Municipal status
  - Municipal district: Naro-Fominsky Municipal District
  - Urban settlement: Naro-Fominsk Urban Settlement
  - Capital of: Naro-Fominsky Municipal District, Naro-Fominsk Urban Settlement
- Time zone: UTC+3 (MSK)
- Postal codes: 143300, 143301, 143302, 143304, 143306, 143308, 143310, 143398
- Dialing code: +7 49634
- OKTMO ID: 46750000001
- Website: www.nfcity.ru

Naro-Fominsk (Russian: На́ро-Фоми́нск) is a town and the administrative center of Naro-Fominsky District in Moscow Oblast, Russia, located on the Nara River, 70 kilometers (43 mi) southwest from Moscow.

== History ==
The Fominskoye village was first mentioned in Russian chronicles under the year 1339, while it was under the rule of Ivan I of Moscow. Napoleon's Grande Armée passed through Fominskoye on its retreat from Moscow in 1812. The modern Naro-Fominsk was established as an urban-type settlement as a result of the merger of the villages of Fominskoye, Malaya Nara and Malkovo in 1925. Town status was granted to it in 1926. The town was severely damaged during World War II after Nazi Germany forces destroyed 687 buildings and a textile factory during the Battle of Moscow in 1941. Western part of Naro-Fominsk was occupied from October 21 to December 26, 1941. Naro-Fominsk was liberated by the 33rd Army under the command of Mikhail Grigoryevich Yefremov.

Naro-Fominsk silk factory was the first in the USSR to produce fabric "Bologna" in the early 1960s.

== Administrative and municipal status ==
Within the framework of administrative divisions, Naro-Fominsk serves as the administrative center of Naro-Fominsky District. As an administrative division, it is, together with twelve rural localities, incorporated within Naro-Fominsky District as the Town of Naro-Fominsk. As a municipal division, the Town of Naro-Fominsk is incorporated within Naro-Fominsky Municipal District as Naro-Fominsk Urban Settlement.

== Transportation ==
The Moscow–Kyiv railway passes through the town.

== Military ==
The town is home to the 4th Guards Kantemirovskaya Tank Division, part of the Western Military District.

== Twin towns – sister cities ==
Naro-Fominsk is twinned with:

- Babruysk, Belarus
- Daugavpils, Latvia
- Elin Pelin, Bulgaria

== Namesakes ==
Naro-Fominsk (595), a Buyan-M Sviyazhsk-class corvette (Project 21631), commissioned into the Russian Navy in 2023.
