= Russian corvette Serpukhov =

Russian Navy warship

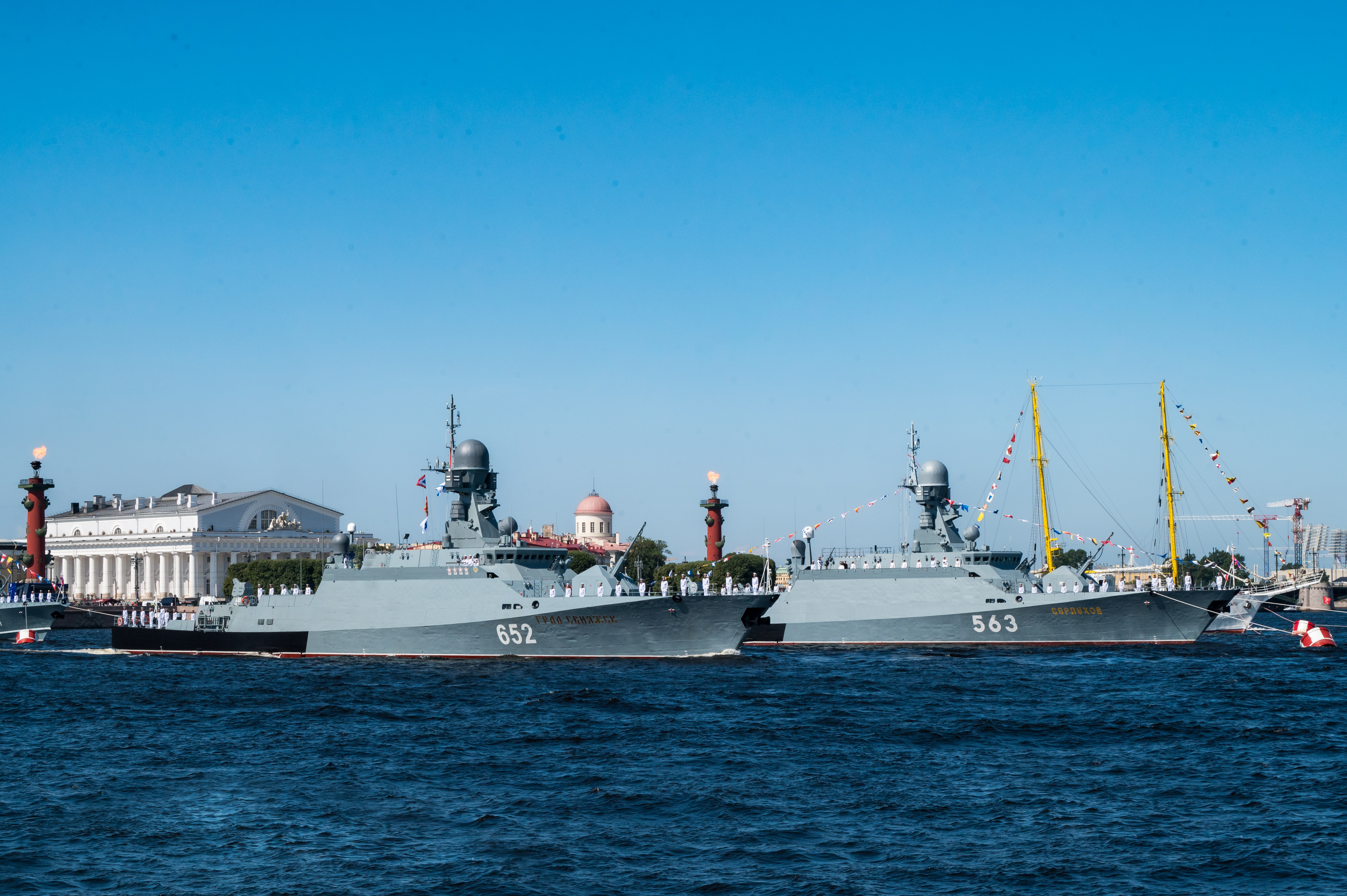
- Serpukhov and Grad Sviyazhsk in July 2024.

History

Russia
- Name: Serpukhov
- Namesake: Serpukhov
- Commissioned: 2015

General characteristics
- Type: Guided-missile corvette
- Displacement: 850 tonnes (840 LT) (standard); 949 tonnes (934 LT) (full)
- Length: 74.1–75 m (243–246 ft)
- Beam: 11 m (36 ft)
- Height: 6.57 m (21.6 ft)
- Draft: 2.5–2.6 m (8.2–8.5 ft)
- Installed power: 4 2,800 kW (3,700 hp) MTU 16V4000M90 diesel engines
- Propulsion: 2 Pumpjets
- Speed: 26 knots (48 km/h; 30 mph)
- Range: 2,500 nmi (4,600 km; 2,900 mi) at 12 knots (22 km/h; 14 mph)
- Endurance: unclear, sources state 10 days and 15 days
- Complement: 52
- Sensors & processing systems: 5P-26 Pozitiv air/surface-search radar; MR-231 navigation radar; MG-757 Anapa anti-saboteur sonar system; 3R14N fire control system; 5P-10-03 Laska fire control system
- Electronic warfare & decoys: PK-10 Smely decoy
- Armament: 1 × 100 mm A-190-01 naval gun; 1 30 mm AK-630-M2 CIWS; 1 × 8 3S-14 VLS cells for Kalibr or Oniks cruise missiles; 2 Gibka/Komar (Note: A 2015 Jane's report stated that Project 21631 corvettes were to be equipped with the Komar SAM turret. In a 2018 TV ForPost report aboard the corvette Vyshny Volochyok, a Russian Navy sailor referred to the ship's system as the Gibka. A 2021 Jane's report on the Rubin-class patrol boat Rasul Gamzatov described a similar naval launcher as possibly a derivative of the 3M-47 Gibka, a Komar, or a crossbreed of the two systems. The exact relationship between the Komar designation and the 3M-47 Gibka system is not consistently described in open sources.) systems, each equipped with 4-8 Igla MANPADS; 2 × 14.5 mm MTPU machine gun

Serpukhov is a Buyan-M-class corvette of the Russian Navy. It was commissioned in 2015.

== History ==
=== Construction ===
Serpukhov was laid down on 25 January 2013.

It is named after the Russian city Serpukhov.

Serpukhov was launched in 2015

It arrived at the Black Sea Fleet base in Sevastopol on 18 November 2015.

Serpukhov was commissioned on 12 December 2015.

=== Deployment ===
In 2016, Serpukhov's sister ship Zelenyy Dol was deployed to the Mediterranean Sea, later followed by Serpukhov. On 19 August Zelenyy Dol and Serpukhov, deployed in the Mediterranean Sea, launched Kalibr cruise missiles at positions of the Al-Nusra group in Syria. As a result of the strikes, number of terrorist facilities were destroyed, including command post and base near the village of Dar Ta Izzah and weapon production plants and warehouses in Aleppo province.

On 25 October 2016, Zelenyy Dol and Serpukhov were deployed to the Baltic Sea to join a newly formed Baltic Fleet division at Kaliningrad.

According to Russian state media, Serpukhov performed a successful launch of the Kalibr in the White Sea at a coastal target in the Chizha test range. Before conducting the launch, the ship, using Russia's inland waterway system, traveled throughout the Baltic Sea to the Gulf of Finland, through the Neva River, Lake Ladoga, and the White Sea–Baltic Canal. It reached the White Sea after having reportedly traversed 3,300 nmi (6,100 km).

On 8 April 2024, Ukrainian military intelligence released a video in which they claimed to have started a fire onboard Serpukhov. The fire reportedly occurred on 7 April. Serpukhov was in harbour at Baltiysk, Kaliningrad Oblast. Ukrainian military intelligence claimed that the fire destroyed "its communication and automation systems." On 3 July 2024, HUR revealed details of Operation "Rybalka" ("Fisherman"), which involved a former Russian sailor setting fire to the Buyan-class corvette Serpukhov on 8 April 2024. He also stole data "about the Baltic Fleet and the Russian military industry." The former sailor joined the Freedom of Russia Legion after defecting. HUR estimated Serpukhov would be out of action for six months. The ship was targeted for its ability to fire Kalibr and Onyx missiles. The corvette was reported active again in mid-2025.
