= Russian corvette Grad Sviyazhsk =

Russian Buyan-M-class corvette

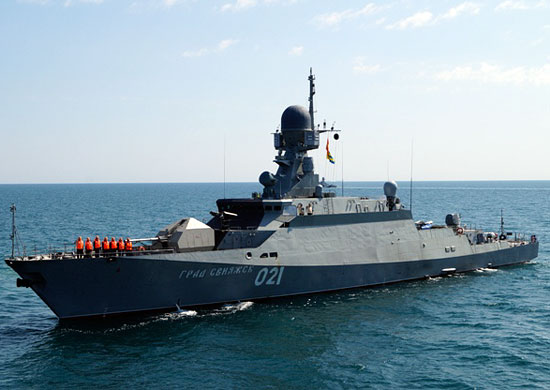
- The Grad Sviyazhsk at sea

History

Russia
- Name: Grad Sviyazhsk
- Namesake: Sviyazhsk
- Awarded: 17 May 2010
- Builder: Zelenodolsk Shipyard, Tatarstan
- Yard number: 631
- Laid down: 27 August 2010
- Launched: 9 March 2014
- Commissioned: 27 July 2014
- Home port: Mahachkala/Kaspiysk
- Identification: MRK 652 (previously 021)
- Status: In active service

General characteristics
- Type: Guided-missile corvette
- Displacement: 850 tonnes (840 LT) (standard); 949 tonnes (934 LT) (full)
- Length: 74.1–75 m (243–246 ft)
- Beam: 11 m (36 ft)
- Height: 6.57 m (21.6 ft)
- Draft: 2.5–2.6 m (8.2–8.5 ft)
- Installed power: 4 2,800 kW (3,700 hp) MTU 16V4000M90 diesel engines
- Propulsion: 2 Pumpjets
- Speed: 26 knots (48 km/h; 30 mph)
- Range: 2,500 nmi (4,600 km; 2,900 mi) at 12 knots (22 km/h; 14 mph)
- Endurance: unclear, sources state 10 days and 15 days
- Complement: 52
- Sensors & processing systems: 5P-26 Pozitiv air/surface-search radar; MR-231 navigation radar; MG-757 Anapa anti-saboteur sonar system; 3R14N fire control system; 5P-10-03 Laska fire control system
- Electronic warfare & decoys: PK-10 Smely decoy
- Armament: 1 × 100 mm A-190-01 naval gun; 1 30 mm AK-630-M2 CIWS; 1 × 8 3S-14 VLS cells for Kalibr or Oniks cruise missiles; 2 Gibka/Komar (Note: A 2015 Jane's report stated that Project 21631 corvettes were to be equipped with the Komar SAM turret. In a 2018 TV ForPost report aboard the corvette Vyshny Volochyok, a Russian Navy sailor referred to the ship's system as the Gibka. A 2021 Jane's report on the Rubin-class patrol boat Rasul Gamzatov described a similar naval launcher as possibly a derivative of the 3M-47 Gibka, a Komar, or a crossbreed of the two systems. The exact relationship between the Komar designation and the 3M-47 Gibka system is not consistently described in open sources.) systems, each equipped with 4-8 Igla MANPADS; 2 × 14.5 mm MTPU machine gun

(MRK 652) Grad Sviyazhsk (Russian: Град Свияжск, lit. 'Town of Sviyazhsk') is the lead ship of Buyan-M-class of corvettes, (Note: Small missile ships (Russian: Малые Ракетные Корабли) by Russian classification) in service with the Russian Navy's Caspian Flotilla. It is named after the town of Sviyazhsk. Built by the Zelenodolsk Shipbuilding Plant, Grad Sviyazhsk was laid down on 27 August 2010, launched on 9 March 2013, and commissioned on 27 July 2014. It is best known for launching Kalibr cruise missiles at targets in Syria.

== History ==
=== Construction ===
Grad Sviyazhsk was laid down at the Zelenodolsk Shipbuilding Plant on 27 August 2010. The Prime Minister of Tatarstan Ildar Khalikov among others, were present at the ceremony.

The ship is named after Sviyazhsk, a fortress built in 1551 by Ivan the Terrible for use as an outpost during the conquest for the Kazan Khanate. Sviyazhsk is now a rurality in the Zelenodolsky District of Tatarstan.

Grad Sviyazhsk was launched on 9 March 2013.

On 17 June of the same year, the ship sailed via Russia's inland waterway system from Zelenodolsk to the Caspian Sea. On 24 June she arrived at the Caspian flotilla headquarters at Astrakhan.

Grad Sviyazhsk begun factory sea trials on 10 July 2013. In August, she entered the Caspian Sea for the first time while still performing factory sea trials.

The ship successfully performed its first firing of the onboard Kalibr missile system during its sea trials on 27 September.

On 15 April 2014, Grad Sviyazhsk entered the Caspian Sea to perform tests in stormy seas.

On 5 May 2014, Grad Sviyazhsk and Uglich, along with other Caspian Flotilla ships, performed tactical exercises in the Caspian Sea.

The ship was commissioned on 27 July, 2014.

=== Deployment ===
In 2014, Grad Sviyazhsk and Uglich participated in an exercise involving the Podsolnukh over-the-horizon surface wave radar.

On 7 October 2015, Grad Sviyazhsk, its sister ships Uglich, Velikiy Ustug and Gepard-class frigate Dagestan, deployed in the Caspian Sea, launched 26 Kalibr cruise missiles at 11 targets in Syria. The missiles flew nearly 1,500 kilometres (930 mi)over Iran and Iraq and struck targets in Raqqa and Aleppo provinces (controlled by the Islamic State) as well as in Idlib province (controlled by the al-Qaeda-linked Nusra Front). According to anonymous United States Department of Defense officials, several of these cruise missiles fired from Russian ships crashed in Iran and did not make it to their intended targets in Syria. Russian and Iranian governments denied the claim of missile crashes. Pentagon and State Department officials refused to comment on the reports. Russia posted video footage of 26 Kalibr missile launches as well as several videos of missile impacts without time or location information.

On 20 November 2015, the same warships launched 18 Kalibr cruise missiles from the Caspian Sea at seven targets in Rakka, Idlib and Aleppo provinces.

In late April 2016 Grad Sviyazhsk, along with many other Caspian Flotilla ships, participated in an exercise. Among the weapons tested were the Kalibr system, A-190, and Duet CIWS.

From 15 to 22 August 2016, The ship once again participated in firing exercises, against sea, air, and land targets.

In September, Grad Sviyyazhsk's Kalibr missiles successfully hit a land target imitating an enemy command center from a distance of 180 kilometres (110 mi), as part of the "Caucasus-2016" (Russian: Кавказ-2016) exercise.

On 15 September 2016 the ship and many others from the Caspian Flotilla participated in an air defense exercise.

In October 2016, Grad Sviyazhsk and the Caspian Flotilla flagship Tatarstan visited the Iranian port of Bender-Enzeli, and the port of Aktau in Kazakhstan.

On 16 December 2016 Grad Sviyazhsk participated in test of over-the-horizon radar systems.

Grad Sviyazhsk and its sister ships Uglich and Velikiy Ustug welcomed ships of the Iranian Navy on an unofficial visit to Makhachkala.

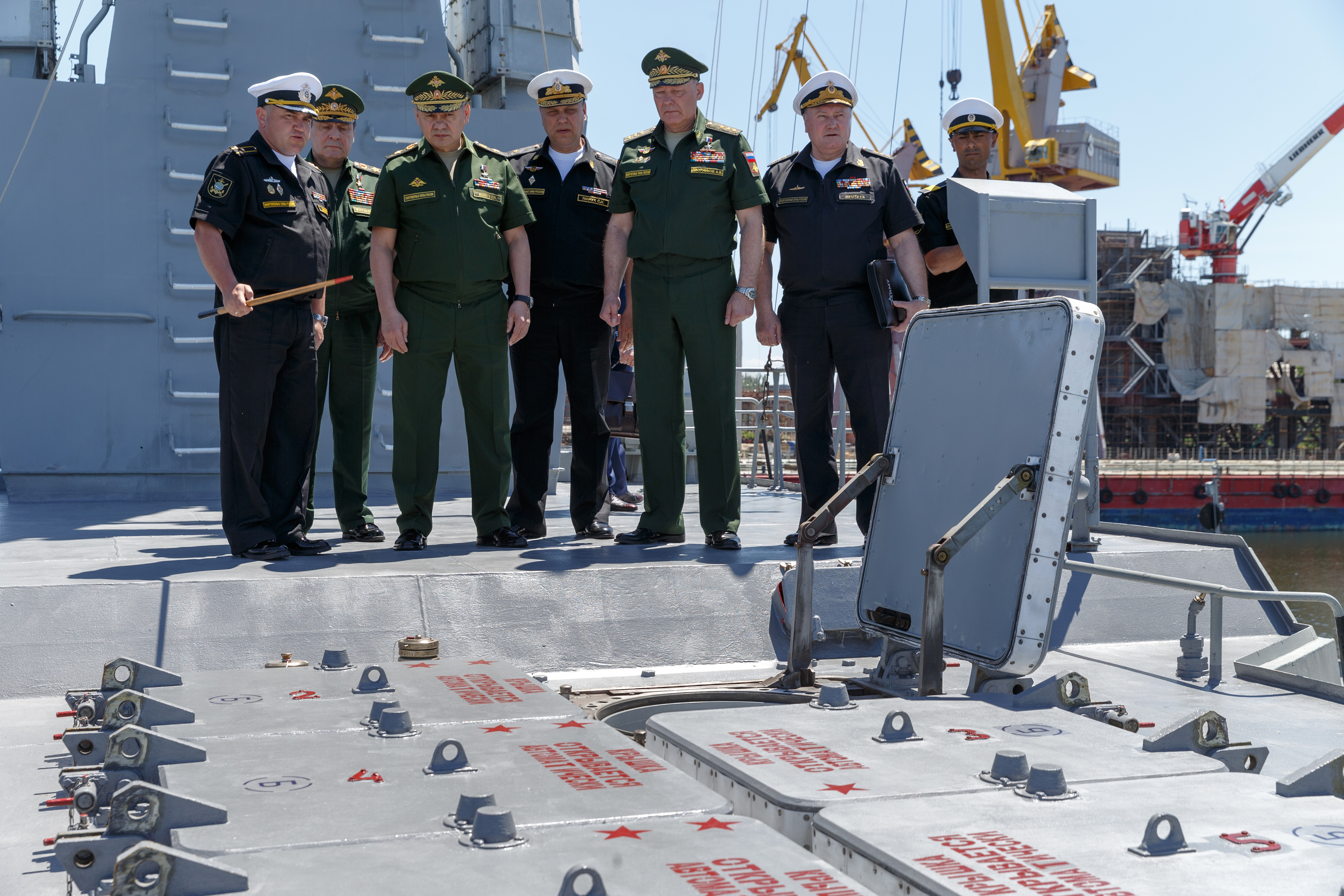
Sergey Shoigu inspecting the 3S-14 VLS on Grad Sviyazhsk

On 25 April 2017, a squadron of ships including the Grad Sviyazhsk set sail as part of a combat readiness test.

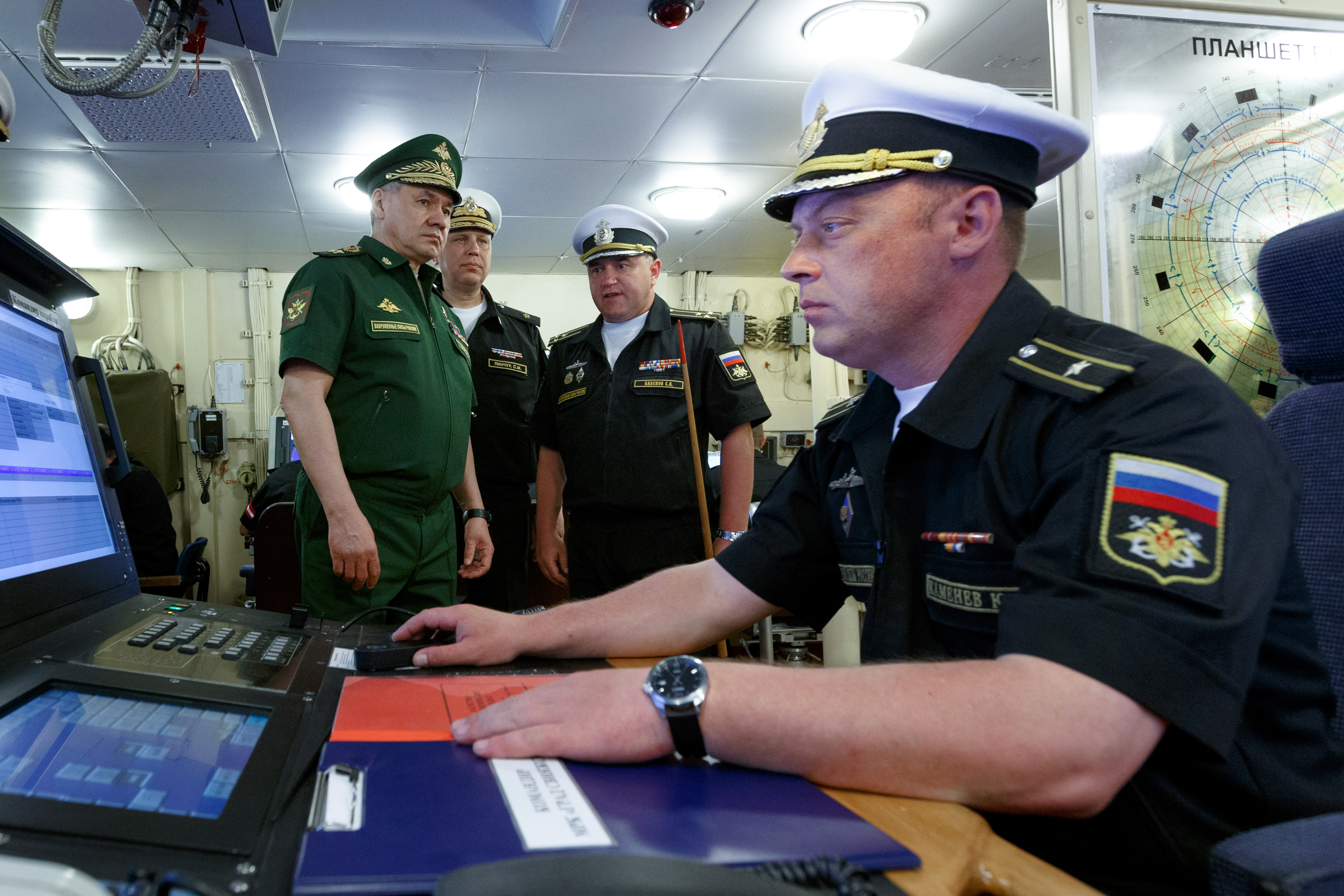
Sergey Shoigu on the bridge of the Grad Sviyazhsk

On 5 July 2017, while on a routine trip to Astrakhan, the ship was visited by Russian Minister of Defense Sergey Shoigu, who participated in a combat exercise involving the onboard Kalibr system.

From 13 to 17 July, she conducted in a missile and artillery firing exercise along with sister ships Velikiy Ustug and Uglich.

On 23 July 2017, Grad Sviyazhsk arrived in the port of Baku, Azerbaijan to participate in an international contest (Russian: Кубок Моря-2017, romanized: Kubok Morya-2017, lit. 'Sea Cup 2017'), which went on from 1 to 11 August. She returned to her homeport having shared the first place prize with the Azerbaijani guard ship G-124.

On 9 October 2017 she participated in a group artillery and missile firing exercise, ending the 2017 summer Caspian Flotilla combat readiness exercises.

On 12 October 2017 Grad Sviyazhsk successfully hit sea and land targets using its Kalibr system, as part of an exercise.

In July of 2018, she, along with Velikiy Ustug transferred to the Black Sea Fleet, and on 17 June the two ships transferred to Russia's permanent Mediterranean task force.

== Known commanding officers ==
- Captain 3rd Rank, Alexey Gordeev
