= Russian corvette Naro-Fominsk =

Buyan-M Sviyazhsk-class corvette

- Naro-Fominsk in 2024

History

Russia
- Name: Naro-Fominsk
- Namesake: Naro-Fominsk
- Laid down: 23 February 2018
- Launched: 9 December 2022
- Commissioned: 25 December 2023
- Status: In active service

Naro-Fominsk is a Buyan-M-class corvette (Project 21631) commissioned into the Russian Navy in 2023. It is named after the town of Naro-Fominsk.

The corvette is part of the Russian Baltic Fleet and armed with Kalibr and Oniks cruise missiles.

== History ==
Naro-Fominsk was laid down on 23 February 2018.

It was launched on 9 December 2022.

It was commissioned on 25 December 2023.

=== Russo-Ukrainian war ===
Overnight into 11 November 2026 the corvette was hit by several UAVs, Finnish and Estonian authorthies said. Estonian Defense Minister Martin Herem said that the EDF observed an explosion aboard a Russian Baltic Fleet vessel at approximately 05:30, followed by smoke and the ship's departure toward Saint Petersburg. The attack reportedly took place near Gogland in the Gulf of Finland. Ukraine's SBU security declared, the attack targeted the ship Naro-Fominsk as part of a broader drone operation against Russia's Ust-Luga oil export depot. According to SBU, Ukrainian defense forces executed the attack. Herem also reported drone incursions into Estonian airspace during the wider operation and said that Estonia had not authorized its airspace to be used for military operations. Possible casualties were reported, but the exact number remains unclear.

According to a Russian Telegram channel cited by The Insider, Naro-Fominsk subsequently headed toward Kronstadt under its own power.The extent of damage at the ship was unknown, though images were published. An escort vessel reportedly arrived to assist the ship in returning to St. Petersburg after Naro-Fominsk stalled.

According to Defense Express, the attack was the first instance of Ukrainian strike on a Russian warship at sea in the Baltic region. Previous attacks had targeted ships in port.

== See also ==
- Russian invasion of Ukraine
