= Russian corvette Velikiy Ustyug =

Russian Buyan-M-class corvette

(MRK 651) Veliky Ustyug (Russian: Великий Устюг, lit. 'The Great Ustug') is a Buyan-M-class corvette of the Russian Navy's Caspian Flotilla. It is named after the Russian town Veliky Ustyug. It was laid down on 27 August 2011, launched on 21 May 2014, and commissioned on 19 December 2014.

== History ==
=== Construction ===
Veliky Ustyug was laid down on 27 August 2011.

It was launched on 21 May 2014.

Veliky Ustyug was commissioned on 19 December 2014.

=== Operational ===
In mid-June 2022, a photo emerged on an online forum showing a Buyan-M-class corvette being towed on the Volga River in a damaged state. Militarnyi said that the ship was likely the Velikiy Ustyug, even though the ship's name and hull number were painted over. The Militarnyi release claimed that the damage was caused by a Ukrainian attack, but also said that it is unknown how and when the ship was damaged. It suggested that the corvette was likely being taken to the Zelenodolsk Shipyard for repairs.
