= Karakurt-class corvette =

Russian naval corvette

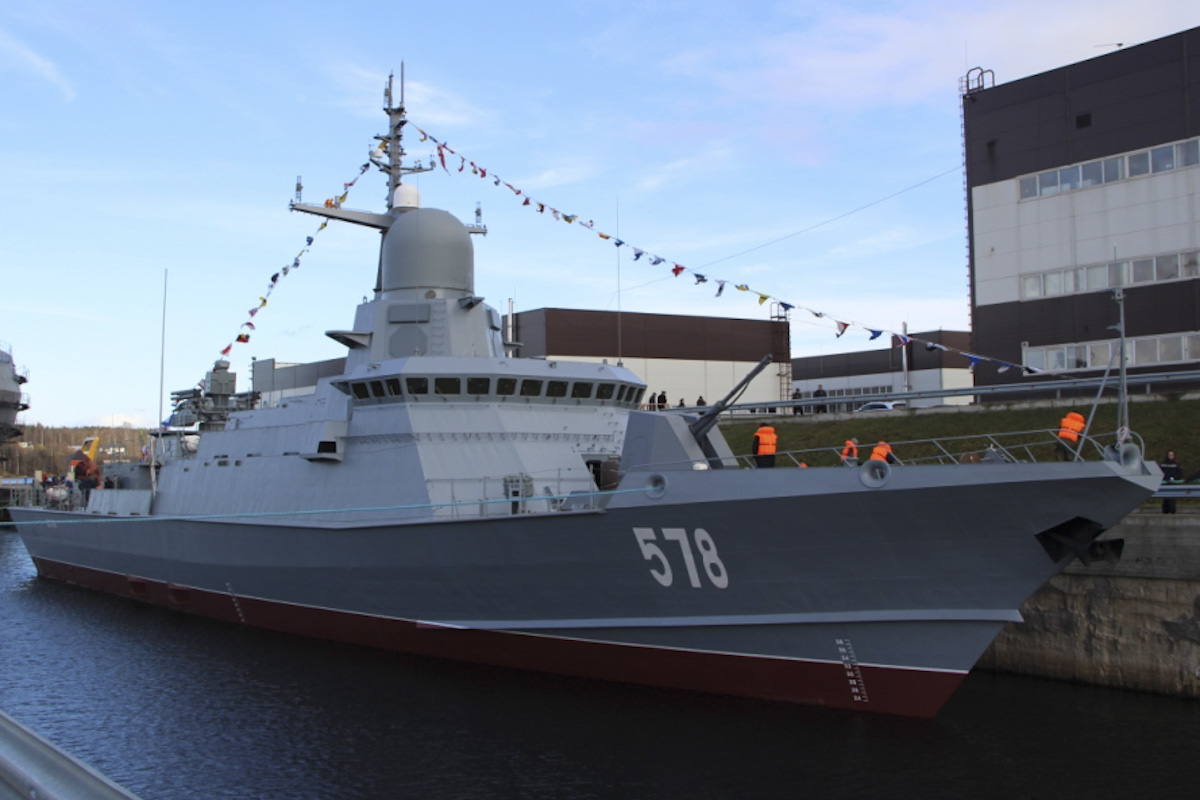
- Burya

Class overview
- Name: Karakurt class
- Builders: Pella Shipyard, Saint Petersburg; More Shipyard, Feodosia; Zaliv Shipbuilding yard, Kerch; Zelenodolsk Shipyard, Zelenodolsk; Amur Shipyard, Komsomolsk-on-Amur; Vostochnaya Verf, Vladivostok
- Operators: Russian Navy
- Preceded by: Buyan class; Buyan-M class
- Cost: approx. RUB2 billion (2017) (US$34.3 million)
- Built: 2015–present
- In service: 2018–present
- Planned: 16
- Building: 2
- Completed: 13
- Active: 7 (+3 likely on trials, one - Askold - heavily damaged, undergoing repairs)
- Lost: 1 (Tsiklon)

General characteristics
- Type: Guided-missile corvette
- Displacement: 800 tons (860 tons after first two vessels)
- Length: 67 m (219 ft 10 in)
- Beam: 11 m (36 ft 1 in)
- Draft: 3.3 m (10 ft 10 in)
- Propulsion: CODAD: 3 Zvezda M-507D1 112 c or 16D49 16D500 12V ZE1600KZ turbodiesel engine with 3 diesel generators DGAS-315
- Speed: 30 knots (56 km/h; 35 mph)
- Range: 2,500 nmi (4,600 km; 2,900 mi)
- Endurance: 15 days
- Complement: 50–70
- Sensors & processing systems: Mineral-M radar; Pozitiv-M 1.2 3D radar; AESA type radar; Pal-N-4; 5P-10-03 Laska Fire-control radar (for naval gun and AK-630 CIWS); SP-520; Lanzor KT-216; PK-10; MP-405-1; Satellite communication station Tsentavr-NM
- Armament: 1 × 76.2 mm 59-caliber AK-176MA or 100 mm A-190 automatic dual-purpose guns; 1 × Pantsir-M CIWS with Hermes-K missiles or 1 × 3M89 Palash/ Palma CIWS with Sosna-R missiles (4+4 SAM in total 8 plus under reload units) or 2 × AK-630M-2 CIWS and Tor missile system (on first 2 vessels); 2 × 4 UKSK VLS cells for Kalibr or Oniks anti-ship cruise missiles; 2 × 12.7x108 mm Kord machine gun
- Aircraft carried: Launcher for Orlan-10 UAV

The Karakurt class, Russian designation Project 22800 Karakurt (Russian: Каракурт, lit. 'Mediterranean black widow spider (Latrodectus tredecimguttatus)'), is a class of Russian Navy corvettes (small missile ships) first commissioned in 2018.

The class is intended as a more seaworthy, blue-water complement to the Buyan-M-class corvettes, designed for the littoral zone and which as of 2015 serve in Russia's Caspian Flotilla, Baltic Fleet and Black Sea Fleet. The ships are designed to be armed with Kalibr or Oniks anti-ship cruise missiles and have an endurance of 15 days. They are also to be a cheap alternative for larger Admiral Grigorovich-class frigates, for which construction was delayed due to the suspended military cooperation with Ukraine, and because of Russia's intention to continue the modernization of its navy until all necessary tasks for construction of larger vessels domestically are solved. Delays in the supply of domestically-produced engines for the Karakurt class have held up the completion of several ships.

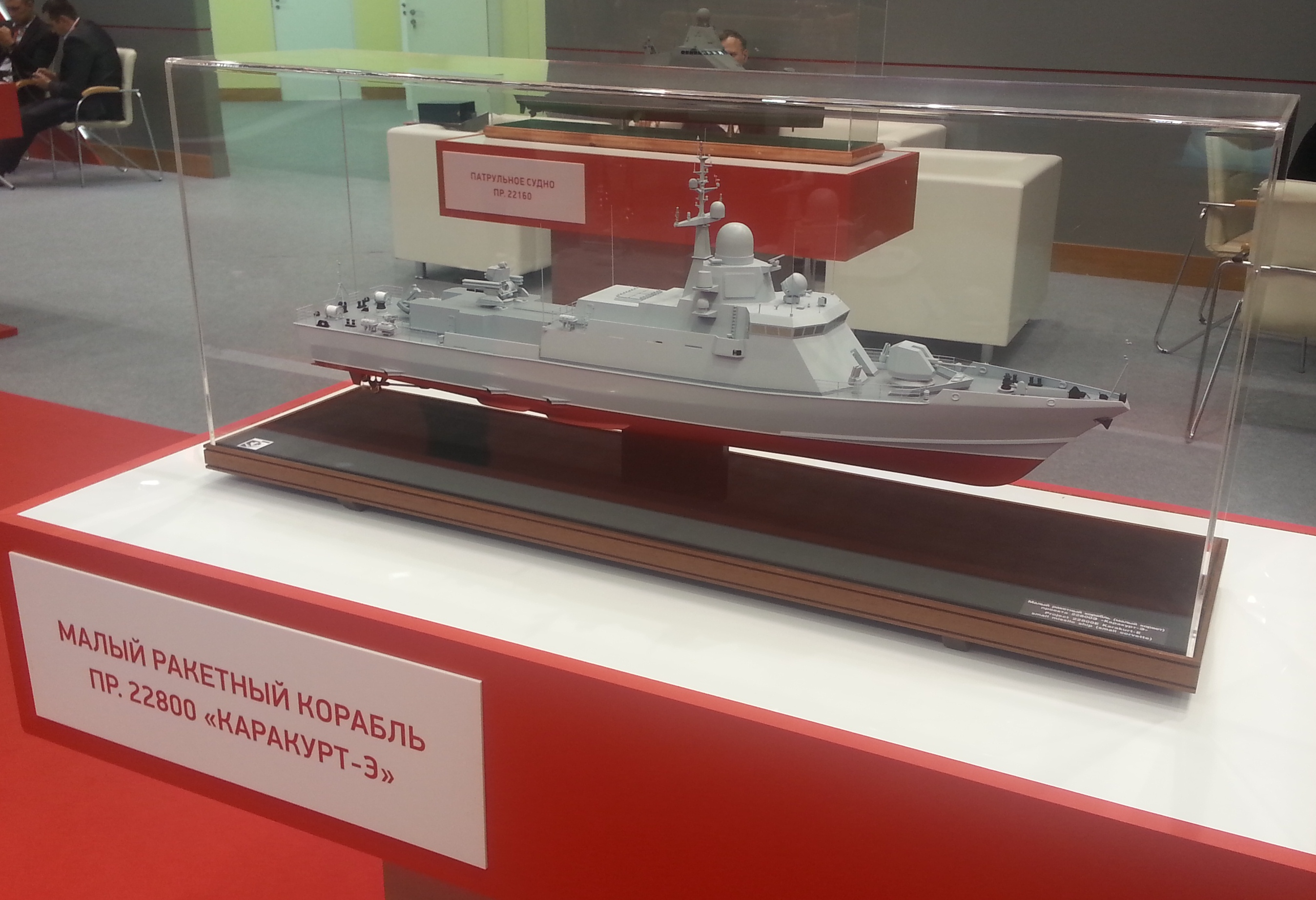
The mock-up of a Karakurt-class corvette ad Army-2016

== History ==
Project 22800 was first publicly presented by Almaz during the International Military-Technical Forum «ARMY-2015», held in Kubinka. At the time, the class was presented yet as "Project 12300". During the exhibition, it was also announced 18 ships are planned for construction.

The first two ships, Uragan ("hurricane", now Mytishchi) and Taifun ("typhoon", now Sovetsk), were laid down at the Pella Shipyard in Saint Petersburg on 24 December 2015.

In August 2016, it was reported that a total of seven ships have been ordered from the Pella Shipyard (one of which would be built at More Shipyard, Feodosia), and that five more ships have been ordered from the Zelenodolsk Shipyard. Three of the five ordered ships, Tsiklon ("cyclone"), Askold and Amur, previously planned to be built by the Zelenodolsk Shipyard, were later laid down at the Zaliv Shipbuilding yard in Kerch, Crimea.

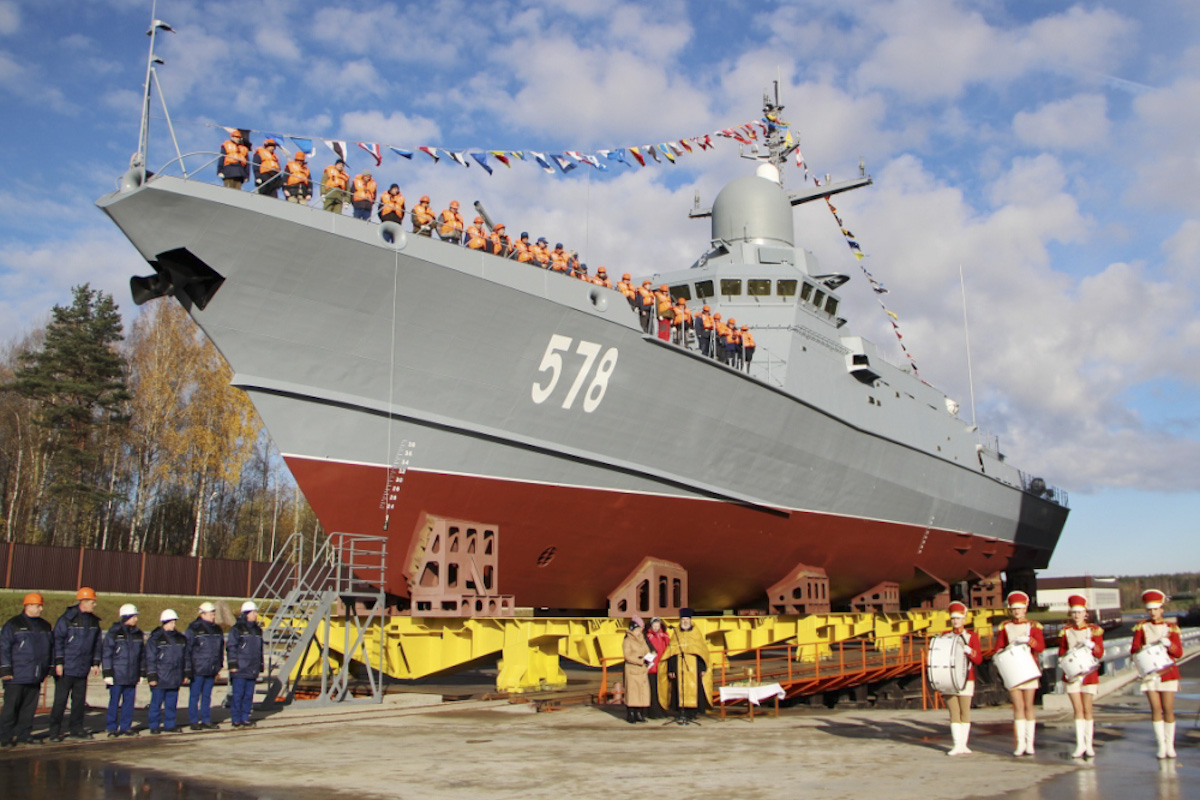
Launching of Burya at the Pella Shipyard

On 29 July 2017, the lead ship of the class was launched.

The Russian Defence Ministry signed a contract for several more vessels during the International ARMY-2017 Military-Technical Forum.

In May 2018, it was reported Mytishchi was undergoing sea trials in Lake Ladoga and the Baltic Sea.

During the International Military-Technical Forum «ARMY-2018», the Russian Defence Ministry signed two contracts for construction of another six vessels. Two ships of the order would be built by the Vostochnaya Verf, Vladivostok and four ships by the Amur Shipyard, Komsomolsk-on-Amur.

On 16 October 2018, Mytishchi began state tests in the White Sea, and was officially accepted into service on 17 December 2018.

Ukrainian forces targeted the Zaliv shipyard with cruise missiles on 4 November 2023. Russian forces stated that a ship was hit. Subsequent imagery appeared to show Askold had been badly damaged. Politico speculated that the ship was hit by a SCALP-EG air-launched cruise missile.

On May 7, 2026, Ukraine carried out strikes on a number of key Russian military assets, including a Russian Karakurt-class corvette at its Caspian Sea base.

== Design ==
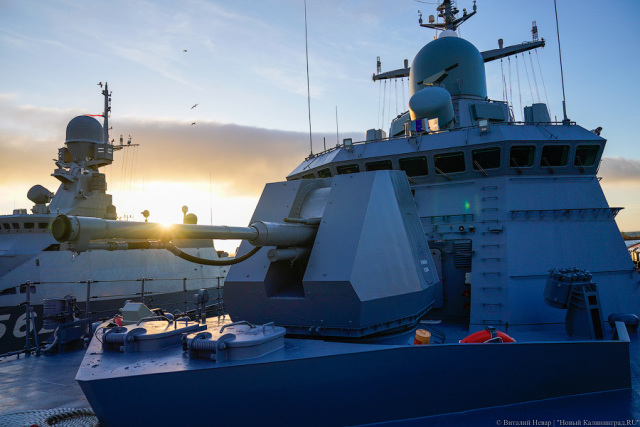
AK-176MA on Tsiklon

Project 22800 derives from Project 12300 Skorpion, a proposed 1990s Almaz design for a 500-ton displacement missile boat, and was also heavily influenced by Project 21631, the Buyan-M corvettes. Ships of the class have a stealth shaped superstructure with an integrated mast carrying four phased array radar panels. The primary armament consists of Kalibr cruise missiles or P-800 Oniks supersonic anti-ship missiles carried in eight UKSK VLS cells in the rear part of the superstructure, behind the bridge. The corvettes built for the Russian Navy will be equipped with a 76.2 mm AK-176MA automatic dual-purpose gun, a modernized version of the AK-176. However, at least on the first ship, the 100 mm A-190 was installed. A proposed export version may carry the Italian OTO Melara 76 mm gun. For anti-missile defense, the first two ships carry a pair of AK-630M gun-based CIWS and were upgraded with the Tor-M2KM which is a modular variant of the Tor missile system.

Starting from the third ship, they will be equipped with Pantsir-M, a navalized version of the Pantsir surface-to-air missile system. The third vessel of the class, Odintsovo, entered service in the Baltic Fleet with the Pantsir-M system in November 2020. The project 22800 is not designed for anti-submarine warfare.

== Ships ==
Italics indicate estimates

Name	Yard No.	Builders	Laid down	Launched	Commissioned	Fleet	Status
Mytishchi (ex-Uragan)	251	Pella Shipyard	24 December 2015	29 July 2017	17 December 2018	Baltic	Active
Sovetsk (ex-Taifun)	252	Pella Shipyard	24 December 2015	24 November 2017	12 October 2019	Baltic	Active
Kozelsk (ex-Shtorm)	254	More Shipyard	10 May 2016	9 October 2019	2026?	Baltic	Reported on "tests" as of 2024
Tsiklon	801	Zaliv Shipbuilding yard	26 July 2016	24 July 2020	12 July 2023	Black Sea	Likely destroyed in May 2024; Russian sources confirmed the ship's destruction.
Odintsovo (ex-Shkval)	253	Pella Shipyard	29 July 2016	5 May 2018	21 November 2020	Baltic	Active
Askold (ex-Musson)	802	Zaliv Shipbuilding yard	18 November 2016	21 September 2021	?	Black Sea	Damaged by missile strike on 4 November 2023; reports suggest that repairs were being attempted as of late 2023
Burya	257	Pella Shipyard	24 December 2016	23 October 2018	8 May 2026	Baltic	Active
Okhotsk	255	More Shipyard	17 March 2017	29 October 2019	2028	Black Sea	Launched
Amur (ex-Passat)	803	Zaliv Shipbuilding yard	30 July 2017	26 December 2022	26 August 2024	Baltic	Active
Vikhr	256	More Shipyard	19 December 2017	13 November 2019	2030	Black Sea	Launched
Tucha	804	Zelenodolsk Shipyard	26 February 2019	30 June 2023	21 December 2024	Black Sea	Reported deployed from the Black Sea Fleet and operating in the Caspian as of April 2025
Rzhev	201	Amur Shipyard	1 July 2019	27 September 2023	2026	Pacific	On sea trials as of 2025
Udomlya	202	Amur Shipyard	1 July 2019	27 September 2023	2026	Pacific	Launched
Taifun	805	Zelenodolsk Shipyard	11 September 2019	7 May 2024	28 August 2025	Black Sea	Reported deployed from the Black Sea Fleet and operating in the Caspian as of April 2025
Shtorm	204	Amur Shipyard	26 December 2019	1 July 2026		Pacific	Both under construction; names Ussuriysk & Pavlovsk have also been reported for these vessels
Uragan	203	Amur Shipyard	29 July 2020			Pacific	Both under construction; names Ussuriysk & Pavlovsk have also been reported for these vessels
?		Vostochnaya Verf				Pacific	Cancelled
?		Vostochnaya Verf				Pacific	Cancelled

== Controversy ==
In November 2022, an arbitration court in Moscow held the first preliminary hearing for a lawsuit against Pella Shipyard of St Petersburg, in which the Russian Defence Ministry is seeking 1.4 billion Rubles (US$23.1 million) over allegations the company was "failing to fulfill supply contracts."
