= VChK-OGPU =

Russian Telegram channel

VChK-OGPU is an anonymous Russian milblogger Telegram channel, known for publishing alleged data breaches from Russian intelligence and security agencies (ВЧК-ОГПУ: VChK = Всероссийская чрезвычайная комиссия - All-Russian Extraordinary Commission or "Cheka"; OGPU = Объединенное государственное политическое управление - Joint State Political Directorate).

== History ==
Rising to prominence in 2019, it claims a high degree of insider knowledge; a number of its claims are unverifiable, but others have been corroborated by other sources.

It is officially designated a "foreign agent" in Russia and faced calls from Russia's media regulator, Roskomnadzor, to take down material deemed to be "false information" or "extremist".

=== Blocking ===
On 7 April 2025, its Telegram channel was removed. At the time of its disappearance, the channel had over one million subscribers. According to statements made by the channel's administrators on their backup account, the channel was deleted without prior notice by Telegram staff, and the associated admin account was blocked at the request of Russian authorities. Telegram's press service told Mediazona that the channel may have been deleted by its owner as a result of allegedly unauthorised access. However, the channel's administrators rejected this, stating that they had sent dozens of emails and messages to Telegram, including to its press service, but had received no response. According to Mash, the Telegram channel may have been compromised by hackers—specifically, accessed and deleted—rather than blocked by Telegram's administration. Mash further said that the channel may have been taken over and erased, based on information provided by four individuals with ties to the cybersecurity field. Preliminary reports suggest that a group of professionals identified the phone number linked to the account, obtained a duplicate SIM card, gained access to the channel, and deleted it on 7 April 2025. The theory of a hack and deletion is indirectly supported by the channel's co-founder, Alexander Shvarev, who told the BBC that the SIM card associated with the channel was blocked around 1 a.m. between April 6 and 7. He noted that if Telegram itself had removed the channel, the SIM card would have remained active; SIM card blocking, he explained, typically occurs after a duplicate is issued.

The account was apparently active in August 2026 when it published an alleged official Russian report regarding the Buyan-M-class corvette Vyshniy Volochyok's collision with a civillian tanker.

== Investigations ==
The project is positioned as investigative and insider journalism, with its main topics being corruption, criminal case materials, abuse of power, personal connections of influential people in government and the special services, and extraordinary events. It is known for publishing documents which, according to the authors, are the full version of the investigator's draft decision to refuse to open a criminal case into the death of opposition figure Alexei Navalny in a Russian prison colony. Before the document was handed over to the politician's relatives and widow, Yulia Navalny, the symptoms were removed from the decision on his death. He is also known for his analysis of the activities of Yevgeny Prigozhin and his entourage. In particular, he published a video in which Prigozhin recruits prisoners to the Wagner Group to participate in the war in Ukraine.
