= Henan Diesel Engine Industry Company =

Chinese diesel engines manufacturer

Henan Diesel Engine Industry Co., Ltd is a member of China Shipbuilding Industry Corporation (CSIC) and the research and manufacturing base of high and medium-speed, high power diesel engines in China, specialized in manufacturing, sale and service of diesel engines, gas engines, diesel generating sets, gas generating sets and emergency/fire pump sets.

== Products ==
HND, built in 1958, specialized in manufacturing L12-180 and 42-160 diesel engines at the beginning.

=== Licensed from Deutz ===
It introduced the licensed technology from DEUTZ-MWM Company, Germany in 1985 and has produced series MWM234 diesel engines in V6, V8 and V12 and series MWM604BL6 diesel engines and TBD620V8, V12 and V16 diesel engines. It has researched and developed series TBD236 and TBD620L6 diesel engines and gas engines with its own intellectual property.

=== Licensed from MAN B&W ===
In 2007, the company obtained the license of manufacturing L16/24 and L21/31 engines from MAN B&W Co., and began batch production in 2008. At present, the output of diesel engines covers 110 kW~2336 kW and that of diesel generating sets covers 80 kW~1700 kW.

== Certification ==
The quality system of design, development, production and servicing of diesel engines, gas engines, diesel generating sets and gas generating sets has been certified by China Xinshidai Quality System Certification Body in accordance with GB/T19001-2000(idtISO9001:2000), at the same time, the quality system of design, development, production and servicing of diesel engines, diesel generation sets has also been certified by this Body in accordance with GJB/Z9001-2001, It means HND got two certificates both for military and civil products. It is also able to provide IMO 2000 NOx emission certificates and classification certificates of CCS, ZY, ABS, GL, BV, DNV and LR.

== Applications ==
The products are not only widely used in the ship field such as military equipment, commercial cargo ship, passenger ship, tourist ship, working ship, fishing ship and high-speed vessel but also in other fields such as petroleum industry, coal industry, mining, nuclear power station, hydropower station, emergency/fire pump and special vehicles.

== Exports ==
The company's products have been exported to more than 50 countries and regions in Asia, Europe, Africa, the Americas and Oceania.
