= 3S-14 =

Russian missile launcher

3S-14 Universal Shipborne Launching Complex
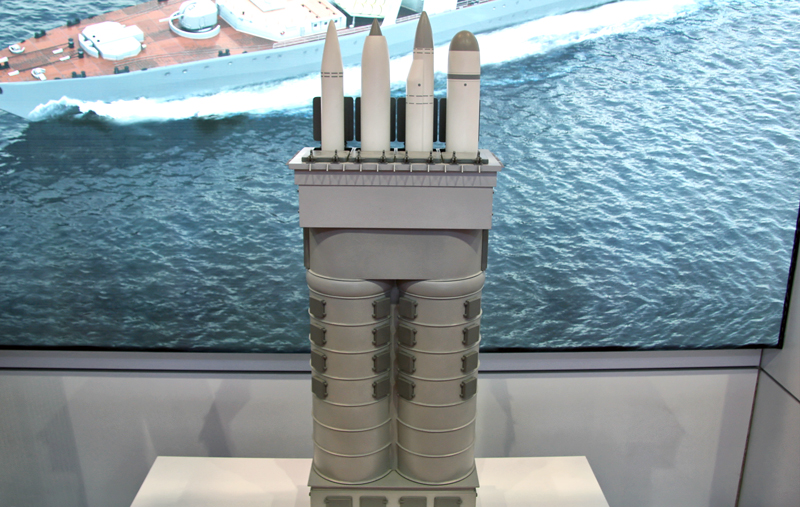
- Mock-up on IMDS-2011
- Place of origin: Russia

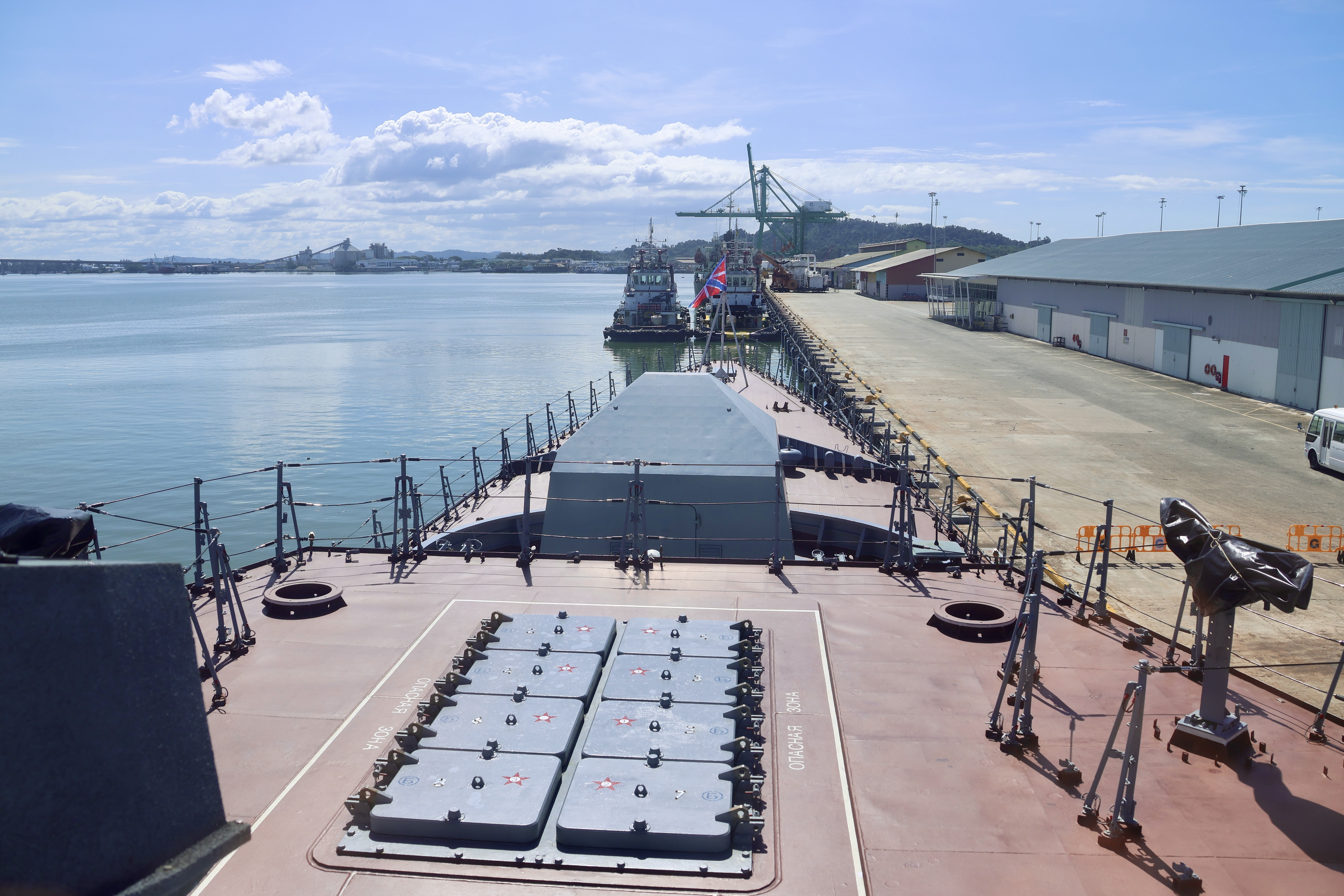
The 3S14 module on the Russian corvette Gremyashchiy

The 3S-14 missile launcher (Russian: 3С14), also known as UKSK (Russian: Универсальный Корабельный Стрельбовый Комплекс, romanized: Universal'nyy Korabel'nyy Strel'bovyy Kompleks, lit. 'Universal Shipborne Launching Complex'), is a vertical launching system in service with Russian Navy.

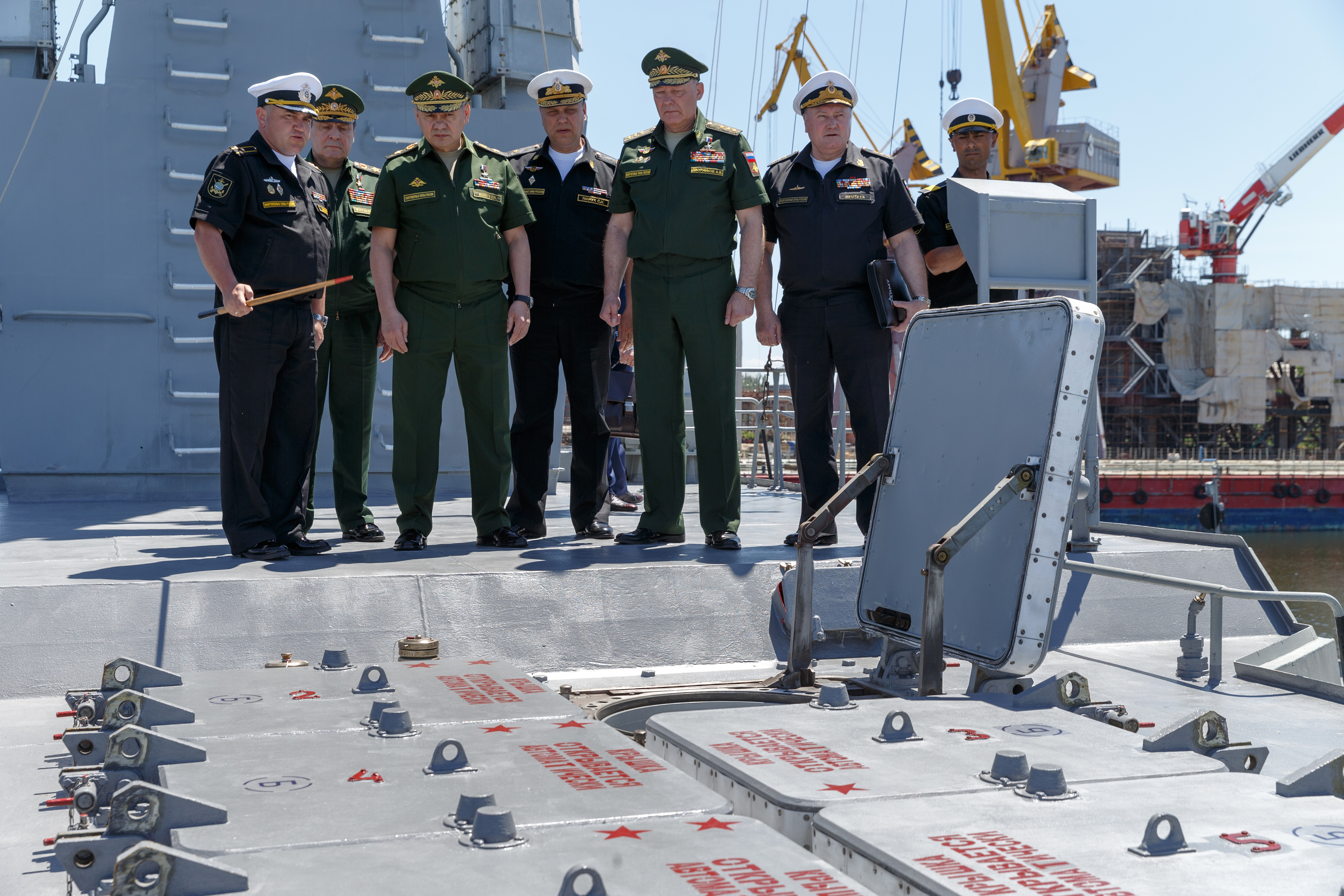
Minister of Defense Sergey Shoigu inspecting the 3S-14 on the corvette Grad Sviyazhsk.

The system exists in container and container-less variants that differ in requirements to the ship its installed to. Deck-mounted angled 3S-14PE version is proposed on export.

It may launch following types of missiles:

- Kalibr missiles - SS-N-30 cruise missile, SS-N-27 anti-ship missile
- Tsirkon cruise missiles
- P-800 Oniks anti-ship missiles
- Otvet anti-submarine missile

Some sources report potential use of surface-to-air missiles (SAMs) in UKSK-M.

The system is installed on:

- project 11661K Gepard-class frigate Dagestan,
- project 22350 class Admiral Gorshkov-class frigate,
- project 11356 Admiral Grigorovich-class frigate
- modernized Udaloy-class destroyer Marshal Shaposhnikov
- modernized Kirov-class battlecruiser Admiral Nakhimov
- project 21631 Buyan-M-class corvette
- project 22800 Karakurt-class corvette
- project 20385 Gremyashchiy-class corvette

== See also ==
- Mk 41 VLS
- Sylver
- K-VLS
- GJB 5860-2006
