= Temryuk Bay =

Bay in the Sea of Azov

Coordinates: 45°28′38″N 37°19′13″E

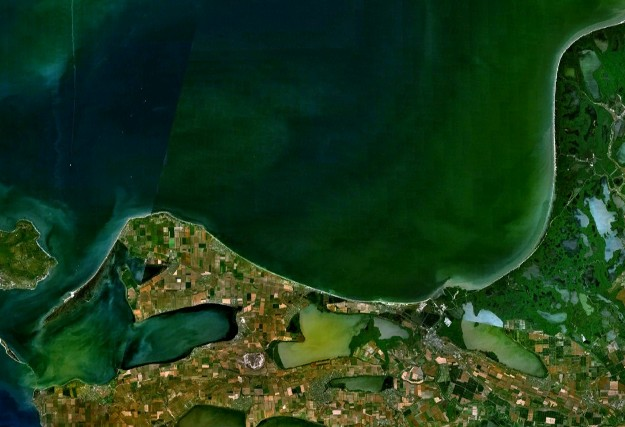
The Temryuk Bay is shown at the centre; the Taman Bay is at the bottom left.

The Temryuk Bay (Russian: Темрюкский залив, Temryuksky zaliv) is a gulf or bay of the Sea of Azov located on the northern coast of the Taman Peninsula, Krasnodar Krai, Russia. It extends roughly 27 km inland and is 60 km at its widest.

The southern portion of the bay is the estuary of the Kuban River. It is the site of the town of Temryuk, which gives its name to the bay.

The freezing period normally extends from mid-January to March. The deepest spot is about 11 meters. The Temryuk Bay is an important fishing ground.
