= AK-100 (naval gun) =

Naval anti-aircraft gun

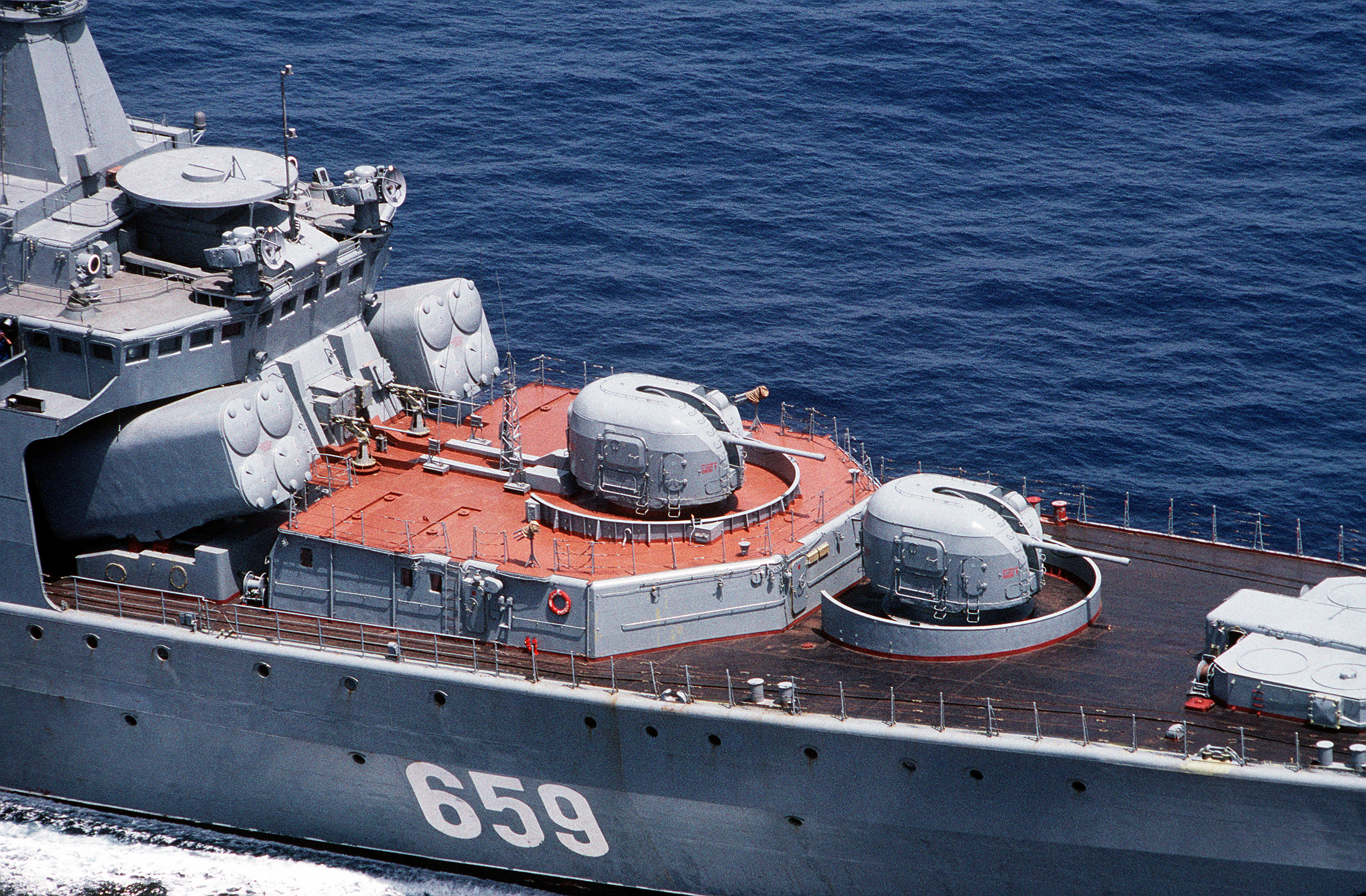
- Two 100mm (3.9-inch) dual purpose guns mounted on the Russian destroyer Vice-Admiral Kulakov
- Type: Naval gun/Anti-Aircraft Gun
- Place of origin: Soviet Union

Production history
- Designed: 1970s
- Produced: 1970s

Specifications
- Shell weight: 26.8 kilograms (59 lb)
- Caliber: 100 millimetres (3.9 in)
- Elevation: -10 / +85 degrees
- Rate of fire: 60 rounds per minute

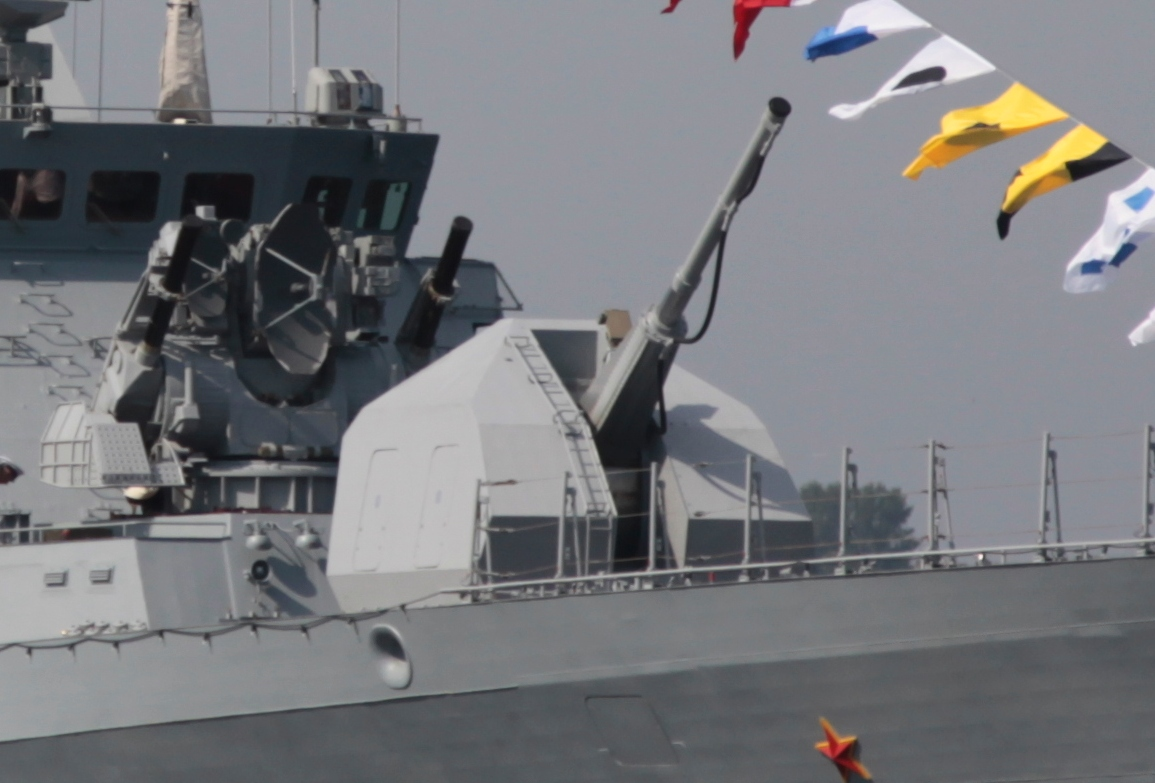
The modernized A-190E-01 naval gun, featured with a stealthy turret design.

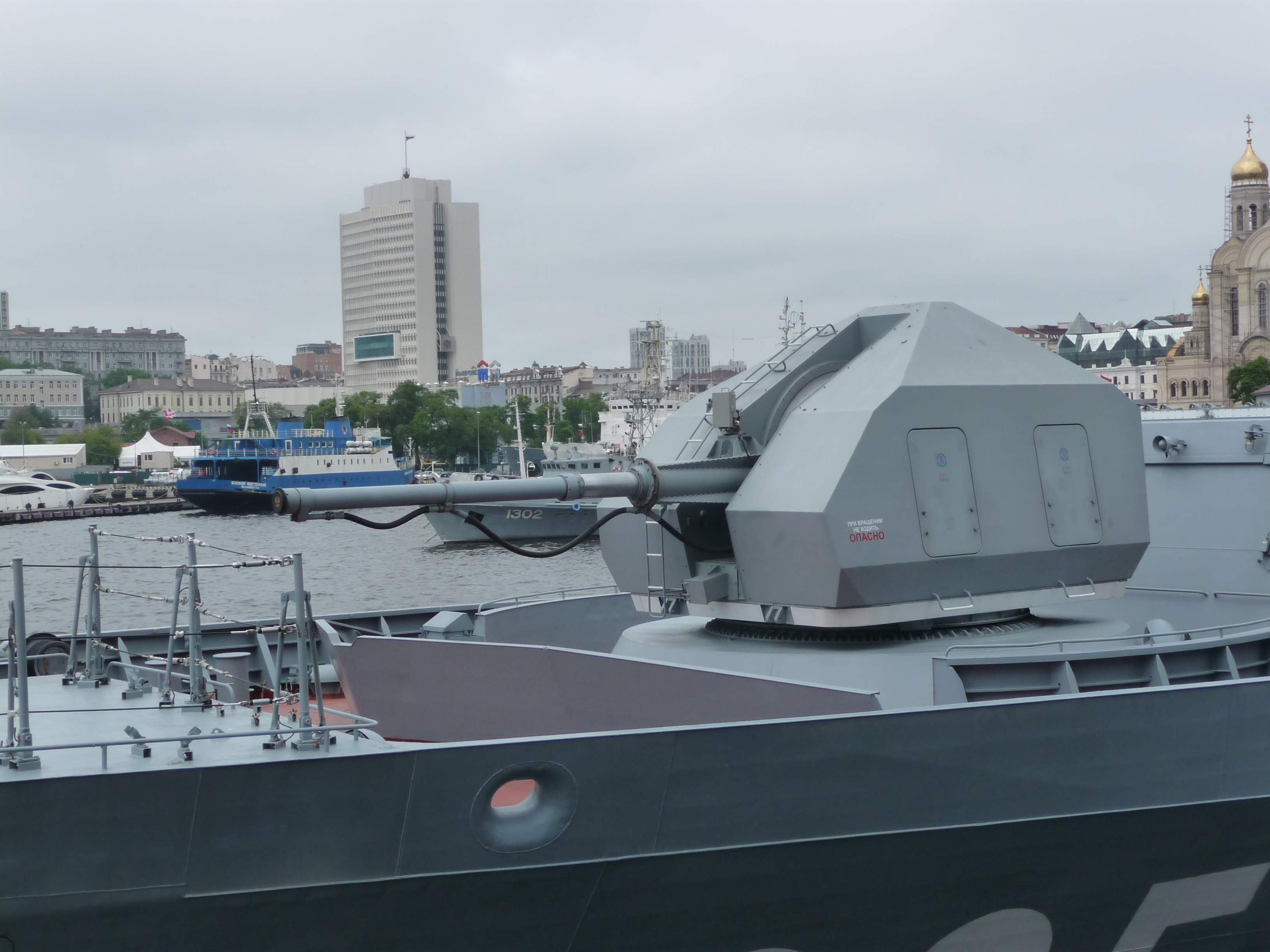

The AK-100 is a Soviet 100mm naval cannon, with a maximum rate of fire of 60 rounds per minute, firing a 26.8-kilogram (59 lb) munition in HE anti-air or HE fragmentation varieties.

== Specification ==
- Weight: 35.5 tons
- Elevation: −10 / +85 degrees
- Rate of Elevation: 30 degrees per second
- Traverse: 360 degrees
- Traverse rate: 35 degrees per second
- Recoil: 20 in (55 cm)
- Rate of fire: 50 to 60 rounds per minute
- Typical ammo storage: 350 rounds for a 4,000 ton class frigate

== A190 ==
The A190, also known as AK-190 and A-190, is a modernized lightweight version of AK-100 developed by Burevestnik Central Scientific Research Institute that first entered service in 1997. Deliveries started to the RF Navy to replace the AK-176 gun mount in 2012 and more than 30 systems with a firing range of more than 20 km were delivered as of 2020. Specifications:

- Weight: 15 tons
- Elevation: -15 / +85 degrees
- Traverse: ± 170 degrees
- Rate of fire: 80 rounds per minute
- Ammo storage: 80 rounds per gun internal

== See also ==
- AK-176
- AK-726
