= Viktor Sokolov (naval officer) =

Russian naval officer (born 1962)

- Виктор Николаевич Соколов
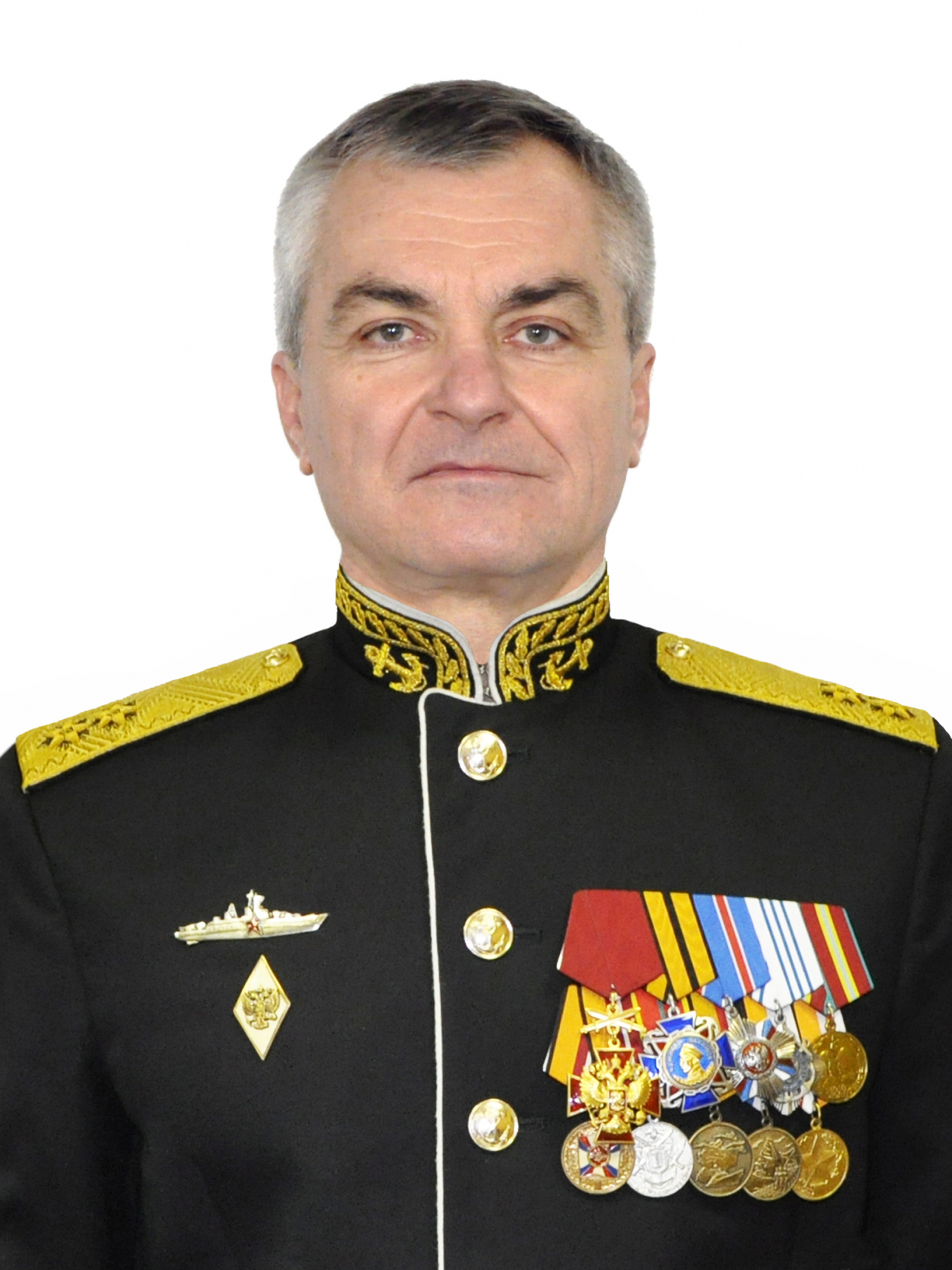
- Born: 4 April 1962 (age 64); Bender, Moldavian SSR, Soviet Union
- Military career
- Allegiance: Soviet Union; Russia
- Branch: Soviet Navy; Russian Navy
- Service years: 1980–present
- Rank: Admiral
- Commands: Primorsky Flotilla; Kola Flotilla; N. G. Kuznetsov Naval Academy
- Awards: Order "For Merit to the Fatherland" Fourth Class; Order of Nakhimov; Order of Military Merit; Order of Naval Merit

Viktor Nikolayevich Sokolov (Russian: Виктор Николаевич Соколов; born 4 April 1962) is an officer of the Russian Navy and former commander of the Black Sea Fleet. He holds the rank of admiral.

In 2016, as deputy commander, Sokolov was in charge of a detachment of the Northern Fleet engaged in operations off the coast of Syria during the Russian intervention there. After several months of operations, Sokolov was thanked for his services by the Chief of the General Staff Army General Valery Gerasimov, and returned with the taskforce to the fleet's homebases in Northern Russia. In January 2020 he left his post as deputy commander of the Northern Fleet to take up his new role as head of the N. G. Kuznetsov Naval Academy. In August 2022 during the Russo-Ukrainian war, he was appointed to command the Black Sea Fleet. In 2024, Vice Admiral Sergey Pinchuk replaced him as commander of the Black Sea Fleet.

Sokolov has not been seen since Ukraine claimed his death on 22 September 2023 when the Black Sea Fleet headquarters in Sevastopol, Crimea, was hit by Storm Shadow cruise missiles fired by Ukraine in Operation Crab Trap. The Russian government denied that he had been killed and published a video purporting to show him still alive. In 2024, the International Criminal Court issued an arrest warrant for Sokolov, citing his alleged war crimes during the Russian invasion of Ukraine.

== Early life and service ==
Sokolov was born on 4 April 1962 in Bender (Tighina), in the Moldavian SSR of the Soviet Union (now Moldova, under Transnistrian control). He entered the M.V. Frunze Higher Naval School in Leningrad on 1 August 1980, and graduated on 30 June 1985. His first assignment was with the Pacific Fleet as commander of the mine-torpedo warfare department of the Riga-class frigate SKR-61 from August 1985 to August 1987, followed by a posting as commander of the same department on the Natya-class minesweeper Yakor from August 1987 to October 1989. In that month he moved to command the mine-torpedo warfare department on the Sonya-class minesweeper BT-51, where he remained until December 1990. Sokolov's next posts were as assistant commander of his former vessel Yakor from December 1990 to December 1991, and then as commander of the Yakor's sistership Zaryad from September 1992 until September 1993. In between these postings he took and completed the Higher Special Officer Classes of the Navy from 1991 to 1992.

Sokolov began his naval service after graduating from the M.V. Frunze Higher Naval School in 1985 and was sent to serve in the Pacific Fleet. He rose from the position of commander of the mine-torpedo warfare department aboard a ship, to eventually command a minesweeper. After further studies in the Higher Special Officer Classes, he returned to the Pacific Fleet as chief of staff of a minesweeper division, and within a short time was appointed to command the division.

== Staff appointments with the Pacific and Northern Fleets (1998–2013) ==
Sokolov was then appointed chief of staff of the 187th Division of minesweepers from September 1993 until September 1994, and then as commander of the 81st Division of minesweepers of the Pacific Fleet, from September 1994 until August 1995. He entered the N. G. Kuznetsov Naval Academy on 1 September that year, and graduated on 30 July 1998.

After completing the courses at the N. G. Kuznetsov Naval Academy in 1998 Sokolov became head of the operational management department at the Pacific Fleet's headquarters, followed by chief of staff and then commander of a brigade of surface ships. He took the advanced courses at the Military Academy of the General Staff of the Armed Forces, and on graduating in 2006, became deputy commander, and then commander, of the Primorsky Flotilla. In 2012 he moved to the Northern Fleet and took command of the Kola Flotilla.

Sokolov returned to the Pacific Fleet as head of the operational management department of the fleet's headquarters until June 2000, after which he became chief of staff of the Primorsky Flotilla's 165th brigade of surface ships, and then the brigade's commander from September 2002 until September 2004. He was then once more on secondment for training purposes, studying at the Military Academy of the General Staff of the Armed Forces from September 2004 until July 2006, before again returning to the Pacific Fleet, this time in the post of deputy commander of the Primorsky Flotilla from August that year. In August 2010 he was advanced to commander of the flotilla, holding the post until September 2012, when he was moved to the Northern Fleet to take command of the Kola Flotilla. In August 2013 he was appointed deputy commander of the Northern Fleet.

== Northern Fleet and commander of Syrian operations (2013–2020) ==
Naval air operations from the Admiral Kuznetsov during her time off the Syrian coast in 2016

In August 2013 he was appointed deputy commander of the Northern Fleet.

In mid-2016 Sokolov was assigned to command a detachment of the Northern Fleet, based around the aircraft carrier Admiral Kuznetsov and the battlecruiser Pyotr Velikiy, for operations off the coast of Syria during the Russian intervention there. The battlegroup left Severomorsk on 15 October 2016. On 15 November 2016 the Russian military leadership announced that the Admiral Kuznetsov's air wing had seen its first-ever combat use, during the military operations in Syria. In his assessment of combat operations, the commander of the Russian military operations in Syria, General-Colonel Andrey Kartapolov, announced that Russian naval aviation had made 420 sorties, 117 of them at night, against 1,252 targets. In addition there had been over 750 sorties carrying out search and rescue, aviation transport support, air reconnaissance and maintaining air superiority. The frigate Admiral Grigorovich was reported to have launched Kalibr cruise missiles against ISIS targets on 15 November 2016. On 6 January 2017 Chief of the General Staff Army General Valery Gerasimov thanked Sokolov for his service in command of the naval task force, and instructed him to prepare for the withdrawal from the area of operations and to return to the fleet base at Severomorsk.

In September 2018 Sokolov took a leading role in the Ocean Shield exercises, which for the first time in Russia's modern history were held in the Mediterranean Sea. All four Russian fleets, as well as the Caspian Flotilla, were represented by a total of 25 ships and vessels, including two submarines, with more than three dozen aircraft and helicopters.

== Head of Naval Academy (2020–2022) ==
After his stint as deputy commander of the Northern Fleet, he was appointed head of the N. G. Kuznetsov Naval Academy on 17 January 2020.

== Commander of the Black Sea Fleet (2022–2024) ==
It was announced on 17 August 2022 by RIA Novosti that Sokolov replaced Igor Osipov as commander of the Black Sea Fleet (BSF). This came after the latter's loss to the Ukrainian Armed Forces during the 2022 Russian invasion of Ukraine of the fleet's flagship, the cruiser Moskva, and the bombardment of the Crimean airfield of Saky (about 70 kilometers north of Sevastopol).

Sokolov was promoted to the rank of admiral on 6 June 2023.

=== Operation Crab Trap and claimed death ===
On 22 September 2023, Ukraine claimed that Sokolov, and many other officers, were killed at a meeting when the Black Sea Fleet HQ at Sevastopol, Crimea was hit by Storm Shadows cruise missiles fired by Ukraine in what was referred to as Operation Crab Trap.

Following these claims, Sokolov was shown on Russian state television attending a defence leaders' meeting remotely the day after the attack. The Russian government stated that they had received no information on Sokolov's death. The BBC reported on 27 September that it was unable to verify whether the meeting was held on the date of the attack, or whether the image of Sokolov on television was later than the attack. Following the Russian denial, Ukraine modified their claim, saying that it came from "open sources". On 27 September two other videos featuring Sokolov were published by Russian media. One of which was reported as him presenting awards to FC Sevastopol players "at this moment"; although the club itself had earlier stated that this ceremony would take place on 20 September. In the other video Sokolov is mentioning the awarding of the 810th Guards Naval Infantry Brigade with the Medal of Ushakov, on 29 August 2023 Mikhail Razvozhayev, the Russian installed governor of Sevastopol, had announced that the 810th Brigade had been presented with this medal. According to Radio Free Europe journalist Mark Krutov a second award ceremony for the football team was held on 27 September, this time attended by Sokolov.

=== Replacement ===
On 15 February 2024, prominent Russian telegram channels including Rybar reported that Sokolov had been replaced as commander of the Black Sea Fleet. Under Sokolov, a significant portion of the Black Sea Fleet had been destroyed by Ukraine, including the large landing ship Tsezar Kunikov on 14 February. The Russian milbloggers speculated that the replacement was due to these losses. Vice Admiral Sergey Pinchuk was expected to take over command of the Black Sea Fleet. On 2 April 2024, Sergei Pinchuk was appointed as commander of the Russian Black Sea Fleet.

=== ICC arrest warrant ===
On 5 March 2024, the International Criminal Court issued an arrest warrant for Sokolov as part of its Ukraine investigation, citing his alleged war crimes of directing attacks at civilian objects, causing excessive incidental harm to civilians or damage to civilian objects and the crime against humanity of inhumane acts during the Russian invasion of Ukraine, all under the Rome Statute. A similar warrant was issued against Sergey Kobylash.

== Awards and family ==
Sokolov was awarded the Order "For Merit to the Fatherland" Fourth Class with Swords, the Order of Nakhimov, the Order of Military Merit and the Order of Naval Merit. He is married, with three sons.

== See also ==
- List of Russian generals killed during the Russian invasion of Ukraine
