= Igor Osipov =

Russian naval officer (born 1973)

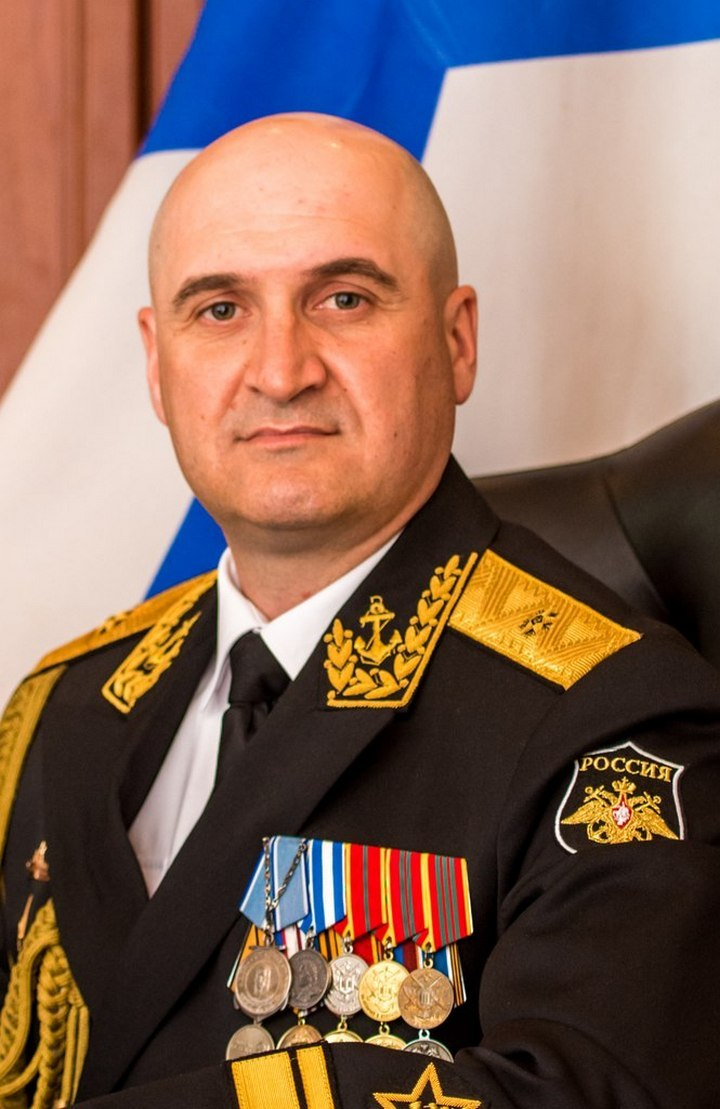
- Osipov as counter-admiral in 2016
- Born: 6 March 1973 (age 53); Novoshumnoye, Fyodorov District, Kostanay Region, Kazakh SSR, USSR
- Allegiance: Soviet Union; Russia
- Branch: Soviet Navy; Russian Navy
- Service years: 1990–present
- Rank: Admiral
- Commands: Caspian Flotilla; Black Sea Fleet
- Awards: Order of Naval Merit

Igor Vladimirovich Osipov (Russian: Игорь Владимирович Осипов; born 6 March 1973) is an officer of the Russian Navy. He has held the rank of admiral since 2021.

Born 1973 in the Kazakh SSR, part of the Soviet Union, Osipov studied at the Higher Naval School of Submarine Navigation, and joined the Pacific Fleet after graduation. His early service was spent aboard the small anti-submarine Grisha-class corvettes, gradually rising through the ranks to command his own vessel. Staff appointments in the fleet followed, as well as further study in the navy's higher education establishments, before he took command of the Baltic Fleet's base at Baltiysk. He was appointed commander of the Caspian Flotilla in 2015, returned to the Pacific Fleet as its chief of staff and deputy commander the following year, and in 2018 became Deputy Chief of the General Staff of the Armed Forces of the Russian Federation. He commanded the Black Sea Fleet from May 2019 to August 2022.

== Career ==
Osipov was born on 6 March 1973 in the village of Novoshumnoye, in the Fyodorov District of Kostanay Region, then part of the Kazakh SSR, in the USSR. He graduated from the Higher Naval School of Submarine Navigation in Saint Petersburg in 1995, with a speciality in navigation. His initial service as an officer began with the Pacific Fleet in August 1995, as weapons commander of the Grisha-class corvette MPK-221. The MPK-221 was part of the 11th division of anti-submarine ships of the Primorsky Flotilla's 47th brigade, tasked with a patrol area covering Russky Island and Paris Bay. Osipov's next assignment, from August 1996 to July 1998, was as assistant commander of the MPK-17, another Grisha-class corvette of the same division.

From July 1998 to July 2000 Osipov commanded MPK-61, part of the 11th division of the 165th brigade of surface ships covering the sea area around Vladivostok and Maly Ulyss Bay. Between July 2000 and December 2001 he served as chief of staff of the 11th division, and commanded the division from December 2001 until September 2002. He undertook studies at the Naval Academy, graduating in 2004, and from June 2004 until January 2007 he was chief of staff of the 165th brigade, and its commander from January 2007 to August 2011.

Osipov graduated from the Military Academy of the General Staff of the Armed Forces of Russia in 2012 and in June that year was appointed chief of staff and first deputy commander of the Baltic Naval Base, Baltiysk, of the Baltic Fleet, and from October 2012 to May 2015 was the base commander. In May 2015 he was appointed commander of the Caspian Flotilla. From September 2016 to August 2018 he was chief of staff and first deputy commander of the Pacific Fleet, and from August 2018 to May 2019 Osipov served as Deputy Chief of the General Staff of the Armed Forces of the Russian Federation. He was promoted to vice-admiral in 2018. On 8 May 2019 he was appointed commander of the Black Sea Fleet, an appointment backdated to 3 May 2019. On 11 June 2021 he was promoted to admiral.

It was announced by RIA Novosti that Osipov was replaced as commander of the Black Sea Fleet by Viktor Sokolov on 17 August 2022. According to the British Defence Intelligence agency, Igor Osipov was likely dismissed as the chief of Russia’s Black Sea Fleet after the sinking of its flagship, the Moskva, on 14 April 2022. The October 2024 edition of the naval journal Morskoy sbornik contained an article by Osipov entitled "The highest special officer classes of the Navy. To teach what is necessary in war". Osipov was credited as head of the Military Institute (additional professional education) of the Military Scientific Center of the Navy "Naval Academy".

Over his career Osipov has been awarded the Order of Naval Merit, and various departmental medals. He is married, with a daughter.

=== Sanctions ===
In February 2022, Osipov was added to the European Union sanctions list for being "responsible for actively supporting and implementing actions and policies that undermine and threaten the territorial integrity, sovereignty and independence of Ukraine as well as the stability or security in Ukraine". He was also sanctioned by the UK government in 2022 in relation to the Russo-Ukrainian War.

Military offices
Preceded by Ildar Akhmerov	Commander of the Caspian Flotilla; 2015–2016	Succeeded by Sergei Pinchuk
