= Grigory Kireyev =

Soviet Navy commander

- Native name: Григорий Петрович Киреев
- Born: 2 February 1890; Lyudinovo, Zhizdrinsky Uyezd, Kaluga Governorate, Russian Empire
- Died: 29 July 1938 (aged 48) Kommunarka shooting ground, Moscow Oblast, Soviet Union
- Allegiance: Russian Empire; Soviet Union
- Branch: Imperial Russian Navy; Soviet Navy
- Service years: 1911–17; 1918–38
- Rank: Fleet Flag Officer 1st rank
- Commands: Caspian Flotilla Pacific Fleet
- Conflicts: World War I Russian Civil War
- Awards: Order of Lenin; Order of the Red Banner

Grigory Petrovich Kireyev (Russian: Григо́рий Петро́вич Кире́ев; 2 February [O.S. 21 January] 1890 – 29 July 1938) was a high-ranking commander in the Soviet Navy. He rose to command the Soviet Pacific Fleet in 1937. Kireyev was executed in 1938 during the Great Purge.

Kireyev was drafted into the Imperial Russian Navy in 1911 and served in the Baltic Fleet during World War I as a ship's mechanic. He became a Bolshevik and after the February Revolution led a detachment that helped organize the Ice Cruise of the Baltic Fleet. After falling ill in 1918, Kireyev spent the Russian Civil War on land in various party roles and in the 1920s successively served on the revolutionary military councils of the Black Sea Fleet and the Baltic Fleet. After graduating from the Naval Academy of the Red Army he became commander of the Caspian Flotilla and then assistant Pacific Fleet commander. Kireyev moved up to command the fleet itself after the beginning of the Great Purge in July 1937. He was arrested in January 1938 and executed in late July. Kireyev was posthumously rehabilitated (acquitted) in 1956.

== Early life ==
Kireyev was born on 2 February 1890 in Lyudinovo in the Zhizdrinsky Uyezd of Kaluga Governorate to a working-class family. After graduating from the Bezhitsa Vocational School, he worked at the Lyudinovo Locomotive Factory. In 1911, Kireyev was drafted into the Imperial Russian Navy. He was initially assigned to the 1st Baltic Naval Crew.

== World War I and Russian Civil War ==
During World War I he served as a ship's mechanic in the Baltic Fleet, becoming a non-commissioned officer. After the February Revolution Kireyev was elected chairman of the Helsingfors Sailors' Club and a member of the Helsingfors Soviet of Deputies, in which he led the Sailors' section. Simultaneously, Kireyev was commissar of a detachment of sailors guarding Baltic Fleet property in Finland. From February to August, he led the Special Detachment of the Baltic Fleet Council of Commissars, among whose tasks was to organize the Ice Cruise of the Baltic Fleet, its evacuation from Helsingfors to Kronstadt ahead of German invasion forces.

During the summer of 1918, Kireyev fell ill and returned to Lyudinovo. Upon his recovery, Kireyev was elected chairman of the Bryansk City Council. He subsequently edited the provincial newspaper and worked in party and government organizations. In Bryansk, he married Anna Ivanovna Ivanyuta. In January 1921, he was elected chairman of the Sevsky Uyezd Executive Committee. In August he became the second secretary of the Bryansk Governorate Party Committee. As a member of Forces of Special Purpose (CHON), responsible for assisting the local Soviet government in maintaining Soviet power, Kireyev participated in the suppression of anti-Soviet uprisings in Bryansk, Sevsk, and Dmitrovsk Uyezds. At the end of 1921, Kireyev was transferred to Siberia to become a member of the Krasnoyarsk Governorate Party Committee.

== Interwar ==
In 1923 he was transferred to political work in the Soviet Navy. In January 1923, Kireyev became a member of the Black Sea Fleet's Revolutionary Military Council. He became a member of the Baltic Fleet's Revolutionary Military Council in January 1926. In 1927 he graduated from the Courses of Improvement for Higher Commanding Personnel (KUVNAS) at the Naval Academy. Kireyev became part-time head of the Baltic Fleet's Political Directorate in July 1928, and in this position participated in the Soviet Navy's cruise around Europe between November 1929 and 1930, which transferred the battleship Parizhskaya Kommuna and cruiser Profintern from the Baltic Fleet to the Black Sea Fleet. Between 1931 and 1933, Kireyev was a student in the special courses at the Naval Academy. After graduating, he took command of the Caspian Flotilla. In 1933, he was awarded the Order of the Red Banner.

In October 1933, Kireyev became assistant commander of the Naval Forces in the Far East, which in 1935 became the Soviet Pacific Fleet. In 1935, Kireyev was awarded the Order of Lenin and in the same year he was made a Fleet Flag Officer 1st Rank when the Soviet Armed Forces introduced ranks. In July 1937, he became commander of the Pacific Fleet after Mikhail Viktorov became commander in chief of the Navy.

== The Great Purge and Death ==
As a result of the call to extend the then-ongoing Great Purge to the armed forces, during the fall of 1937, Army Commissar 1st Rank Pyotr Smirnov led a working group to purge the Pacific Fleet of ""saboteurs" and "enemies of the people." Smirnov used forced confessions from those previously arrested to implicate more officers and create the appearance of a conspiracy in the fleet. After being summoned to Moscow, Kireyev was arrested on 10 January 1938. He was sentenced to death and executed at the Kommunarka shooting ground on 29 July 1938 on charges of participation in a "military conspiracy", sabotaging the Pacific Fleet, and spying for Japanese intelligence, along with Viktorov and the rest of the fleet's high-ranking officers. His wife was sentenced to eight years in the gulag as the wife of an "enemy of the people." Kireyev was rehabilitated (acquitted) on 13 June 1956.
