= Sergei Pinchuk =

Russian naval officer (born 1971)

Sergei Mikhailovich Pinchuk
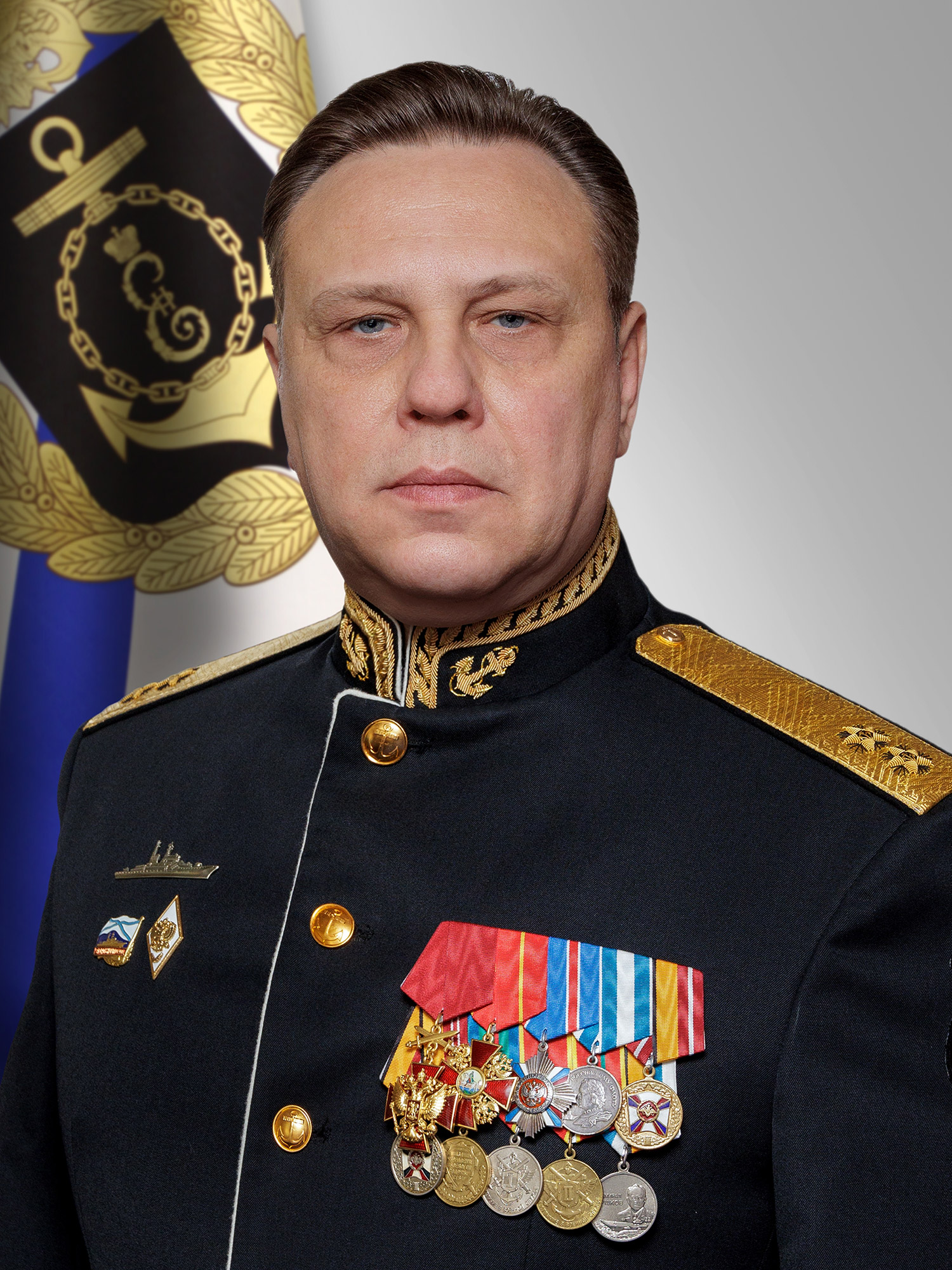
- Born: 26 July 1971 (age 55); Sevastopol, Crimean Oblast, Ukrainian SSR, Soviet Union
- Military career
- Allegiance: USSR; Russia
- Branch: Soviet Navy; Russian Navy
- Service years: 1988–present
- Rank: Admiral
- Commands: Novorossiysk Naval Base; Caspian Flotilla
- Awards: Order of Military Merit

Sergei Mikhailovich Pinchuk (Russian: Сергей Михайлович Пинчук; born 26 July 1971) is an officer of the Russian Navy. He currently holds the rank of admiral, and is commander in chief of the Black Sea Fleet.

== Career ==
Pinchuk was born on 26 July 1971 in Sevastopol, then part of the Ukrainian SSR, in the Soviet Union. His father, Mikhail Fedorovich Pinchuk, was also a naval officer, who commanded the Kynda-class cruiser Groznyy, and served as the deputy commander of the Baltic Fleet for rear services, reaching the rank of kontr-admiral during his career. Sergei attended the Nakhimov Naval School in Saint Petersburg, graduating in 1988 and entering the Nakhimov Black Sea Higher Naval School in Sevastopol.

Pinchuk's initial service as an officer was spent with the Baltic Fleet, where from 1993 he commanded the anti-aircraft missile battery aboard the fleet's flagship, the Sovremenny-class destroyer Nastoychivy. Over a period of several years he rose through the ranks, serving as commander of the ship's missile and artillery division, then as senior assistant and finally commanding the ship between 2004 and 2007. During this period he took the navy's higher officer classes, graduating in 1999, and further education at the N. G. Kuznetsov Naval Academy, graduating in 2004. He was chief of staff of the Baltic Fleet's surface forces, based at Baltiysk, and from 2007 he was commander of the 105th brigade of ships, and chief of the Kronstadt garrison.

From December 2010 Pinchuk served as chief of staff and first deputy commander of the Leningrad Naval Base. On 22 December 2011 he joined the Black Sea Fleet with an appointment to command the Novorossiysk Naval Base. In February 2014 Pinchuk was promoted to kontr-admiral, and in September 2014 he began studying at the Military Academy of the General Staff of the Armed Forces of Russia.

Pinchuk graduated from the academy in 2016, and was appointed acting commander of the Caspian Flotilla in July that year, being confirmed in his position on 20 September. On 18 February 2021 he was promoted to the rank of vice-admiral. On 9 May 2021 he was appointed deputy commander in chief of the Black Sea Fleet.

=== Black Sea Fleet commander ===
On 15 February 2024, prominent Russian telegram channels including Rybar reported that the commander of the Black Sea Fleet, Viktor Sokolov, had been replaced. Under Solokov, a significant portion of the Black Sea Fleet had been destroyed by Ukraine, including the large landing ship Tsezar Kunikov on 14 February. The Russian milbloggers speculated that the replacement was due to these losses. It is reported that Sergey Pinchuk will take over command of the Black Sea Fleet. He was appointed acting commander of the Black Sea Fleet on 15 February 2024, and then confirmed as commander on 2 April. He was promoted to the rank of admiral on 21 February 2025.

== Personal life ==
Over his career Sergei Pinchuk has been awarded various departmental orders and medals, including the Order of Military Merit in 2009. He is married, with a son and daughter.

=== Sanctions ===
He was sanctioned by the UK government in 2022 in relation to the Russo-Ukrainian War.

In February 2022, Pinchuk was added to the European Union sanctions list for being "responsible for actively supporting and implementing actions and policies that undermine and threaten the territorial integrity, sovereignty and independence of Ukraine as well as the stability or security in Ukraine."

Military offices
Preceded by Igor Osipov	Commander of the Caspian Flotilla; 2016–2021	Succeeded by Aleksandr Peshkov
