= Zverev =

Zverev (Russian: Зве́рев) feminine: Zvereva, from зверь meaning beast, is a Russian-language surname. Belarusian: Zverau / Zveraw, Zverava (Belarusian: Звераў, Зверава). It may refer to

- Alexander Zverev Sr. (born 1960), Soviet tennis player
- Alexander "Sascha" Zverev (born 1997), German tennis player
- Alexander Zverev (sprinter) (born 1989), Russian sprinter
- Anatoly Zverev (1931–1986), Soviet artist
- Arseny Zverev (1900–1969), Soviet finance minister
- Ellina Zvereva (born 1960), Belarusian discus thrower
- Ilya Zverev, Russian writer
- Lydia Zvereva
- Mischa Zverev (born 1987), Russian-born German tennis player
- Natalia Zvereva (economist)
- Natasha Zvereva (born 1971), Belarusian tennis player
- Nina Zvereva
- Nicolas Zverev (1887–1965), Russian-French ballet dancer
- Nikolai Zverev (1832–1893), pianist and teacher of major Russian classical music figures
- Oleg Zverev (born 1967), Russian naval officer
- Yana Zvereva (born 1989), Russian épée fencer

== See also ==
- Zverev Bridge, a bridge in Moscow
- 2323 Zverev, minor planet
- Zver
