= Caspian Flotilla =

- Russian: Каспийская флотилия Kaspiyskaya flotiliya
- Great emblem of the Caspian Flotilla
- Active: November 1722 – present
- Allegiance: Russian Empire (1722–1917); Soviet Russia (1917–1922); Soviet Union (1922–1991); Commonwealth of Independent States (1991–1992); Russian Federation (1992–present)
- Branch: Russian Navy
- Role: Naval warfare; Amphibious warfare
- Size: c. 12-16 surface combatants; 8 landing craft; c. 6 minesweepers; 3 anti-saboteur boats
- Part of: Russian Armed Forces
- Garrison/HQ: Astrakhan (HQ); Makhachkala; Kaspiysk; Baku (historical)
- Engagements: Russo-Persian War (1722–23); Persian Expedition of 1796; Russo-Persian War (1804–1813); Russian Civil War; World War II; Anglo-Soviet invasion of Iran; Battle of Stalingrad; Russian military intervention in Syria; Russian invasion of Ukraine
- Decorations: Order of the Red Banner

Commanders
- Current commander: Rear Admiral Oleg Zverev
- Notable commanders: Fyodor Apraksin

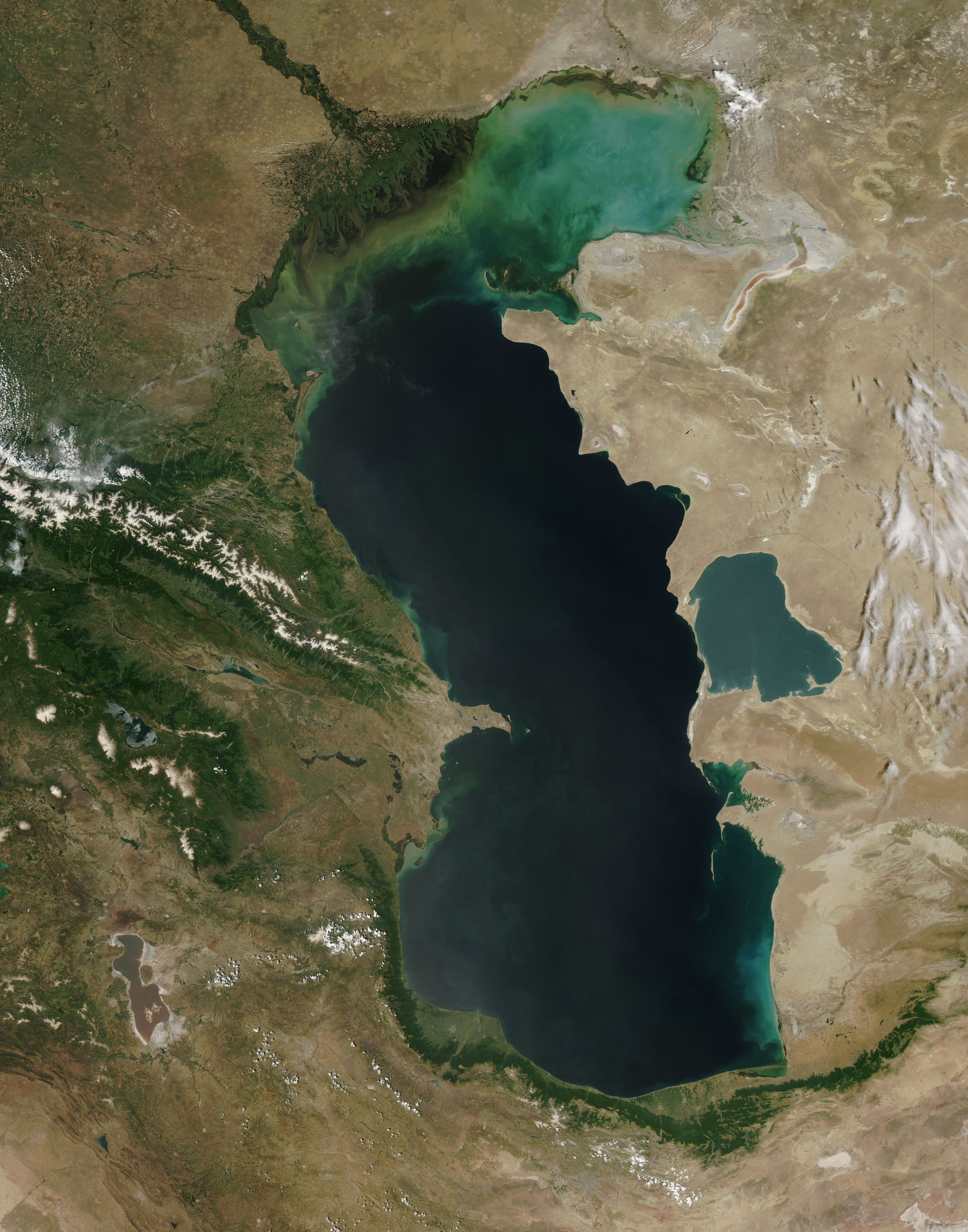
The Caspian Sea

The Caspian Flotilla (Russian: Каспийская флотилия, romanized: Kaspiyskaya flotiliya) is the flotilla of the Russian Navy in the Caspian Sea.

Established in November 1722 by the order of Tsar Peter the Great as part of the Imperial Russian Navy, the Caspian Flotilla is the oldest flotilla in the Russian Navy not operating in a body of water connected to the open ocean. In 1918, the fleet was inherited by the Russian SFSR then the Soviet Union in 1922, where it formed part of the Soviet Navy and was awarded the Order of the Red Banner in 1945. Following the collapse of the Soviet Union in 1991, the Caspian Flotilla and most of its vessels were inherited by the Russian Federation.

The Caspian Flotilla's headquarters are in Astrakhan, but were historically in Baku (now in Azerbaijan) from 1867 until 1991, with additional facilities in Makhachkala (HQ being moved there) and Kaspiysk. The current commander is Rear Admiral Oleg Zverev.

== History ==
Russia's presence on the Caspian Sea can be traced to the reign of Alexei Mikhailovich (1645–1676) who sought to expand trade relations between Russia and Persia (now Iran) in the 17th century and protect trade routes along the Volga Route. However, the Caspian Flotilla (CF) itself was formally created in November 1722 in Astrakhan by order of Peter the Great. Led by the admiral Fyodor Apraksin, it participated in Peter's Persian campaign of 1722–1723 though most of the gains made during that conflict were subsequently lost.

During the reign of Catherine the Great a Russian naval presence was reestablished, assisting the Russian army in capturing Derbent and Baku during the Persian Expedition of 1796. As a result of the Treaty of Gulistan of 1813 which ended the Russo-Persian War (1804–1813), the CF remained the only naval flotilla in the Caspian Sea. Baku, an ice free port, became the Flotilla's main base in 1867.

=== Russian Revolution and Civil War ===
As the situation on the Caspian Sea stabilized the number of ships in the CF began to decrease. By the beginning of the 20th century, it had two gunboats and a few armed steamers. The sailors of the CF were actively engaged in the revolutionary movement in Baku in 1903–1905 and establishment of the Soviet authority in 1917 in that region.

In order to provide assistance to the Red Army, they formed the Military Fleet of the Astrakhan Region (Военный флот Астраханского края, or Voyenniy flot Astrakhanskogo kraya) in April – June 1918, reinforced with torpedo boats and submarines from the Baltic Sea in the fall of 1918. On October 13, the Soviets renamed it to the Astrakhan-Caspian Military Flotilla (Астрахано-Каспийская военная флотилия, or Astrakhano-Kaspiyskaya voennaya flotiliya). The ships of the flotilla were captured by the counterrevolutionary Centrocaspian Dictatorship in August 1918 and later regained by the Soviets after the overthrow of the Musavat government.

The British Royal Navy was active in the Caspian Sea in support of White forces. The British established a flotilla composed of local vessels and vessels that could be transported overland through Persia. By May 1919, with a victory at the Battle of Alexandrovsky Fort, the Royal Navy had succeeded in driving the Bolsheviks from the Sea and up the Volga River. However, once the Civil War ended with victory for the Bolsheviks, Red forces re-established full control in the region.

=== Soviet era ===
In July 1919, the Astrakhan-Caspian Military Flotilla was combined with the Volga Military Flotilla (Волжская военная флотилия, or Volzhskaya voyennaya flotiliya) and renamed to the Volga-Caspian Military Flotilla (Волжско-Каспийская военная флотилия). On May 1, 1920, the Soviets established the Caspian Fleet, which comprised three auxiliary cruisers, ten torpedo boats, four submarines and other ships.

Together with the Caspian Fleet, there was the Red Fleet of the Soviet Azerbaijan, stationed in Baku, as well. Both fleets completed the conquest of the Caspian Sea from the White Army. In July 1920, Caspian and Azerbaijani fleets were combined into the Naval Forces of the Caspian Sea (Морские Силы Каспийского моря, or Morskiye Sily Kaspiyskogo morya) and would later be renamed to the Caspian Flotilla on June 27, 1931.

Like all elements in Soviet society, the navy was decimated by the Stalin purges of the 1930s. At least 30 percent of the Soviet Army and Navy officer corps, including three of the four fleet commanders, were arrested and shot or sent to the gulags. These encompaassed officers in the Caspian Flotilla, including at least one former commander, Grigory Kireyev.

During the Great Patriotic War of 1941–1945, the Caspian Flotilla secured vital sea shipping of army units, military equipment and different cargo, especially during the Battle of Stalingrad and the battle for the Caucasus. (During the war, some of the military resources provided through Lend Lease were shipped to the USSR via the Persian Corridor and the Caspian Sea).

During the Cold War the Caspian Flotilla was used to test missile armed ekranoplanes.

== Under the Russian Federation ==
Following the dissolution of the Soviet Union, the flotilla shrank. With Russia, Azerbaijan, Turkmenistan and Kazakhstan joining to found the Commonwealth of Independent States (CIS), the CIS navy officials proposed to keep the flotilla under joint CIS command. However, the idea did not materialize, and on 16 April 1992, the countries agreed in Baku to divide the flotilla with its 50 small and medium-size vessels, bases, a navy school and buildings, which was in sharp contrast to protracted dispute between Russia and Ukraine over splitting the Black Sea Fleet. Azerbaijan initially claimed 75 percent of the flotilla but later settled for less, while Turkmenistan expressed a desire to keep the flotilla united. The Kazakh contingent was removed to serve as a basis for Kazakhstan's naval service. For several years, Russia continued to lead a joint Turkmen-Russian force based at Astrakhan.

=== Naval Infantry ===
Among the Flotilla's units, from 2000, has been a new Naval Infantry brigade, the 77th, based at Kaspiysk. The headquarters and two battalions of the brigade were scheduled to be established by August 1, 2000. It was reported in June 2000 that the new brigade, which had inherited the lineage of the disbanded 77th Guards Motor Rifle Division, formerly with the Northern Fleet, was to have its troops housed in Kaspiysk and Astrakhan and have as many as 195 combat vehicles and one Gepard-class frigate sent to it from Chukotka and the Northern Fleet, respectively.

The brigade was to have helicopters added to it, according to the June 2000 report. The Brigade's full name was the 77th Detached Guards Moscow-Chernigov Order of Lenin, the Red Banner, Order of Suvorov Marine Brigade. It was disbanded in 2009.

The brigade had comprised its headquarters at Kaspiysk; the 414th Detached Naval Infantry Battalion (Kaspiysk); the 725th Detached Naval Infantry Battalion (Kaspiysk); the 727th Detached Naval Infantry Battalion (Astrakhan); the 1200th Detached Reconnaissance Battalion (Kaspiysk); the 1408th Independent Howitzer Artillery Battalion; the 1409th Independent Howitzer Artillery Battalion; the 975th Detached Naval Infantry Battalion (Kaspiysk); the 1387th Detached Air Defence Missile and Artillery Battalion; and the 530th Detached Electronic Countermeasures Company.

In Dagestan, a regiment of the marine infantry (the 177th) was formed on December 1, 2018, as part of the Caspian Flotilla of the Southern Military District (YuVO). It was reported that the new formation was fully staffed with modern weapons and military equipment, including BTR-82A armored personnel carriers, 120 mm self-propelled mortars 2S9 Nona, 122 mm howitzers D-30, unmanned aerial vehicles (UAV) "Eleron" and "Orlan".

The regiment has been heavily engaged in the War in Ukraine. In September 2025, elements of the regiment were reported operating in eastern Ukraine and at that time concentrating with other units, from the 40th, likely the 61st, the 155th and the 336th naval infantry brigades, in the area southwest of Kostyantynivka.

=== Modernization of the Flotilla & operations in Syria, Ukraine and support of Iran ===
The flotilla has received 3 new Project 21630 Buyan-class stealth type river gunboats built by the St. Petersburg Almaz shipyard.

On November 13 and 23, 2009, there were two separate sets of explosions at the 31st Arsenal of the Caspian Sea Flotilla, an ammunition depot, in Ulyanovsk. Ten servicemen died. The depot was to be closed.

The first Russian warship equipped with the Caliber missile system entered service with Caspian Flotilla in 2012. On October 7, 2015, Russia's Defense Minister Sergey Shoigu announced that four Russian Navy warships in the Caspian Sea had fired a total of 26 Kalibr-class cruise missiles at the positions of the terrorist group ISIL in Syria.

Up to 2020, further enhancements in the capabilities of the Caspian Flotilla were announced. In 2019, it was announced that an aviation component would be added to its capabilities involving the deployment of Be-200 aircraft and Mi-14PB helicopters with the Flotilla. Further air support is drawn from 4th Air and Air Defence Forces Army (HQ: Rostov-on-Don) in the Southern Military District. In 2020, the deployment of the Bal coastal defence missile system with the Flotilla was also announced.

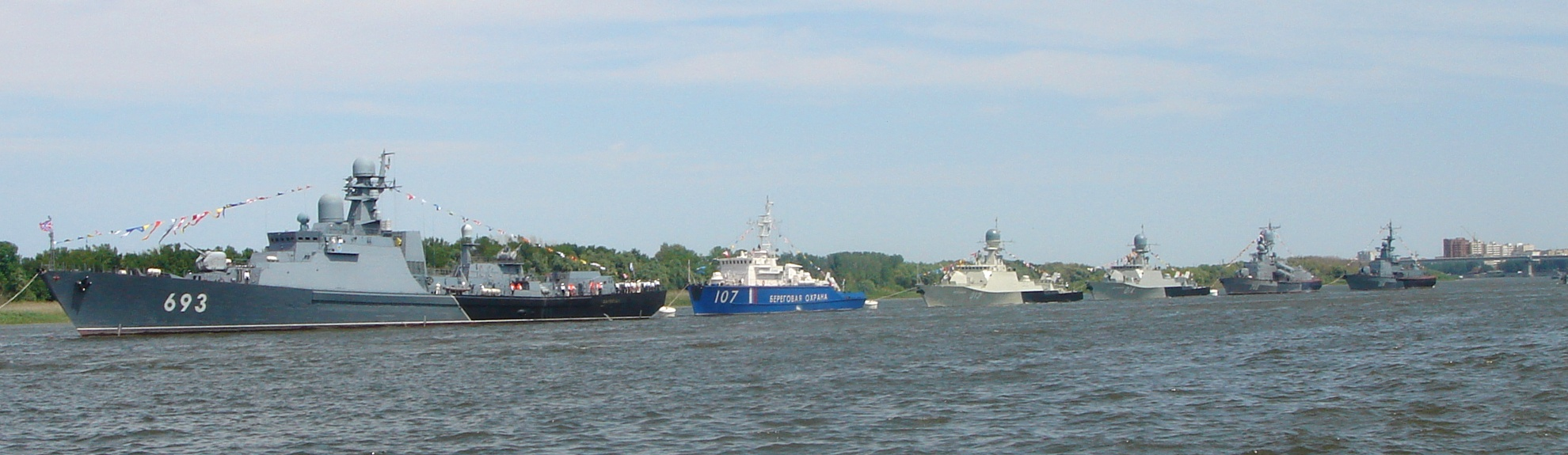
The ships of the Caspian flotilla parade in Astrakhan in 2012

As of 2016, 85 percent of the Caspian Flotilla consists of modern ships and vessels. In 2014–2015, Flotilla received 3 Project 21631 Buyan-M missile corvettes, one modernized frigate and auxiliary vessels. On September 20, 2016, Rear Admiral Igor Osipov was replaced by Rear Admiral Sergey Pinchuk.

On March 20, 2022, the Russian Defense Ministry claimed that ships of the CFL had fired Kalibr-class cruise missiles at a Ukrainian fuel and lubricant depot in Kostiantynivka, Mykolaiv Oblast, supported by air-launched Kh-47M2 Kinzhal hypersonic missiles.

On 17 June 2022, a photo emerged of the ship Veliky Ustyug being towed on the Volga River in a damaged state. The Buyan-M-class corvette had participated in the 2022 Russian invasion of Ukraine.

On November 6, 2024, Ukraine launched a drone attack on the Caspian Flotilla with an A-22 reportedly damaging the Gepard-class frigates Tatarstan and Dagestan and one Buyan-class corvette in the Kaspiysk naval base.

On May 7, 2026, Ukraine carried out strikes on a number of key Russian military assets, including a Russian Karakurt-class corvette at its Caspian Sea base.

During the 2026 Iran war, Russia's links with Iran through the Caspian assumed strategic importance with Moscow using the route to both resupply Iran and develop alternative routes for Iran to circumvent the American blockade of Iran's Persian Gulf/Indian Ocean coastline. Israel's destruction of Iranian naval assets on the Caspian in March 2026 indirectly enhanced the position of the Russian Flotilla as the major naval force on the Sea. In July 2026, and based on Iran's support for Russia, Ukraine began attacking Iranian merchant vessels on the Sea with drone strikes.

== Ships in service ==
- Frigates
  - 2 Gepard-class light frigates, Tatarstan, Dagestan (both reported "damaged" by Ukrainian long-range drone strikes in November 2024; both reported active again as of April 2025)
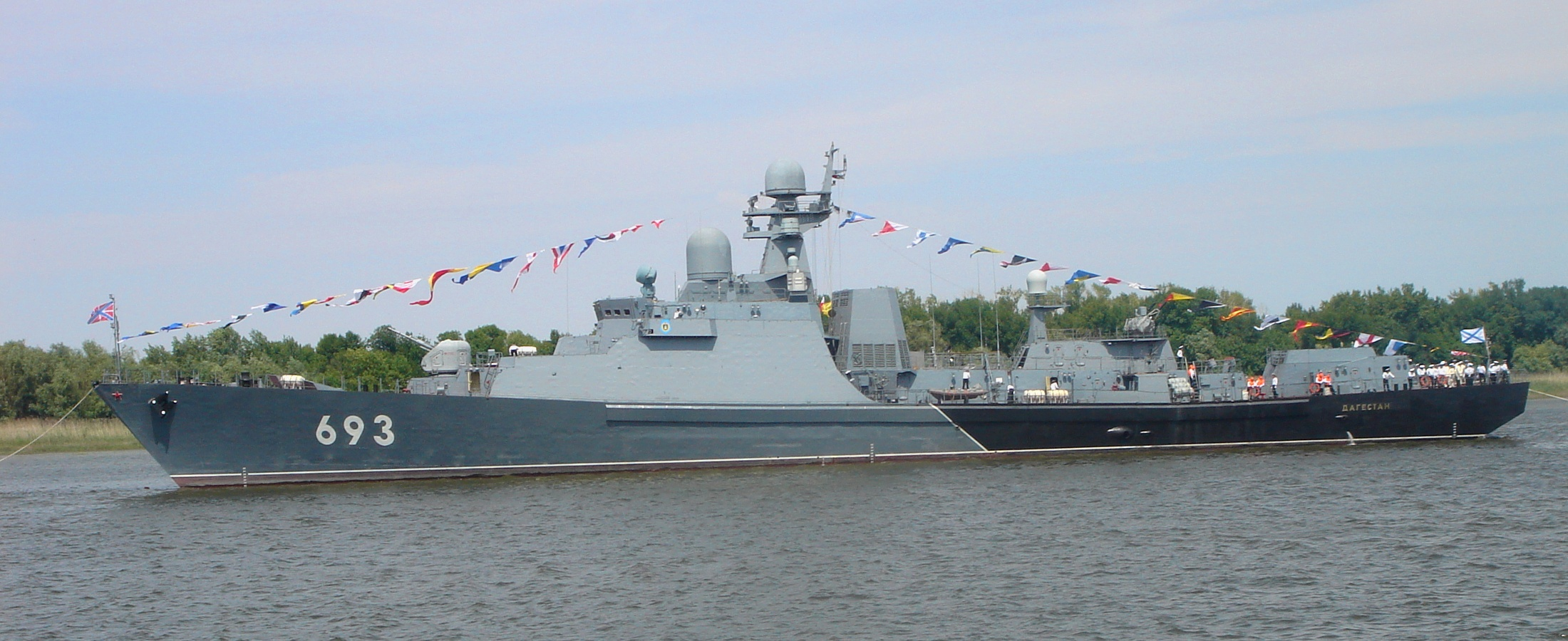
    Dagestan
- Corvettes
  - 3 Buyan-class corvettes, Astrakhan, Volgodonsk, Mahachkala (Astrakhan & Volgodonsk reported active as of 2024)
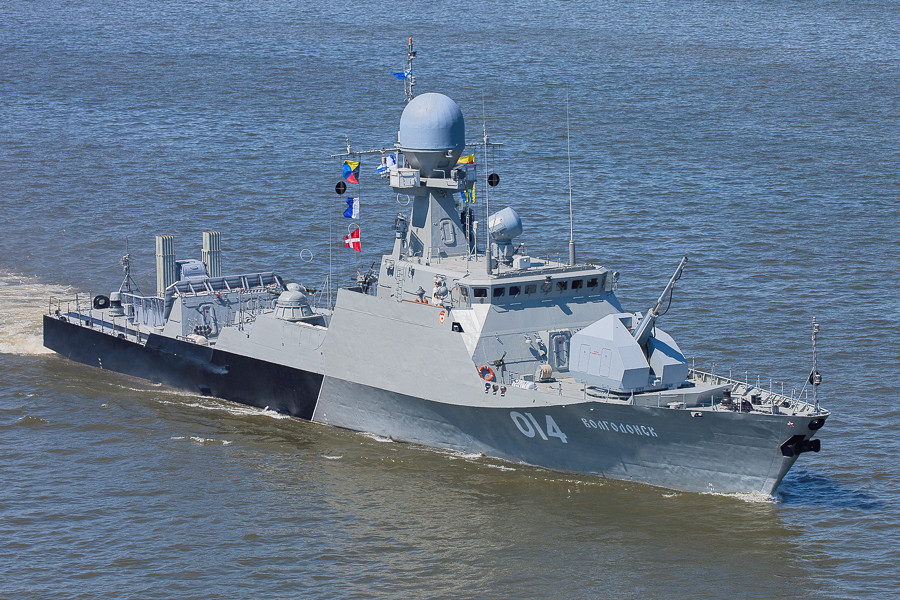
    Volgodonsk
  - 3 Buyan M-class missile corvettes: Grad Sviyazhsk, Uglich, & Veliky Ustyug (Veliky Ustyug reported active as of 2024; Grad Sviyazhsk active as of 2026; Uglich reported active as of 2025); Veliky Ustyug reportedly damaged in 2022 during the early stages of the Russo-Ukraine War, now repaired)
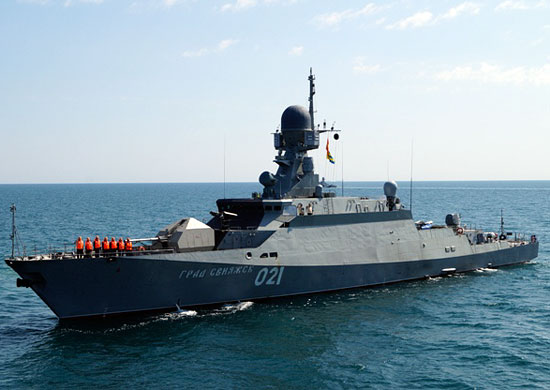
    Grad Sviyazhsk
  - 2 Karakurt-class missile corvettes: two vessels of the class (Tucha & Typhoon) reported deployed from the Black Sea Fleet and operating in the Caspian as of April 2025
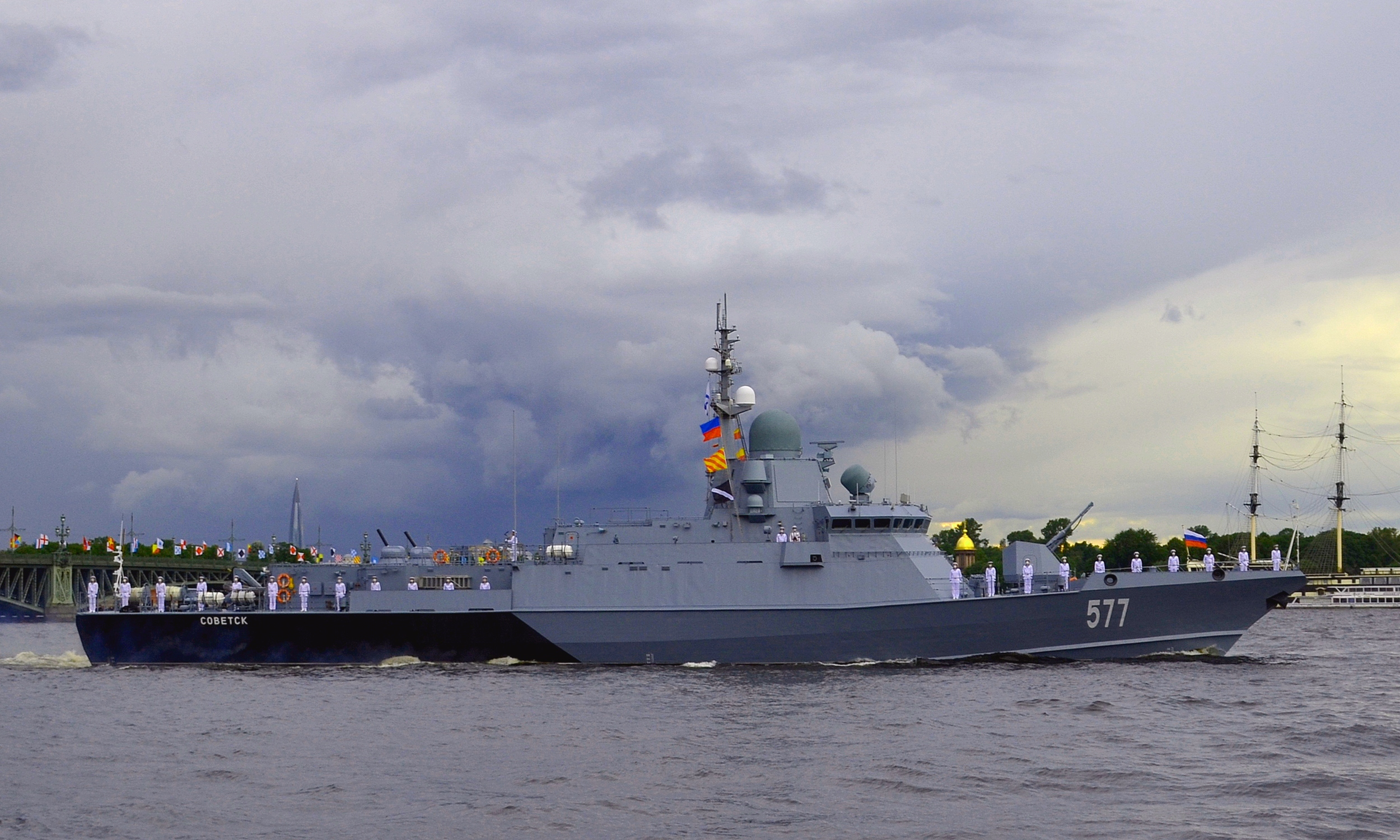
    Karakurt-class vessel, Sovetsk
  - 2 updated Tarantul IV-class missile corvettes (Stupinets & Strelok) expected to enter service with the Flotilla in 2025/26 (Ukrainian sources report one Tarantul IV struck by drones in July 2026; specific vessel and extent of damage unclear)
- Gunboats
  - 4 Shmel-class gunboats Ak-209, Ak-223, Ak-201, Ak-248
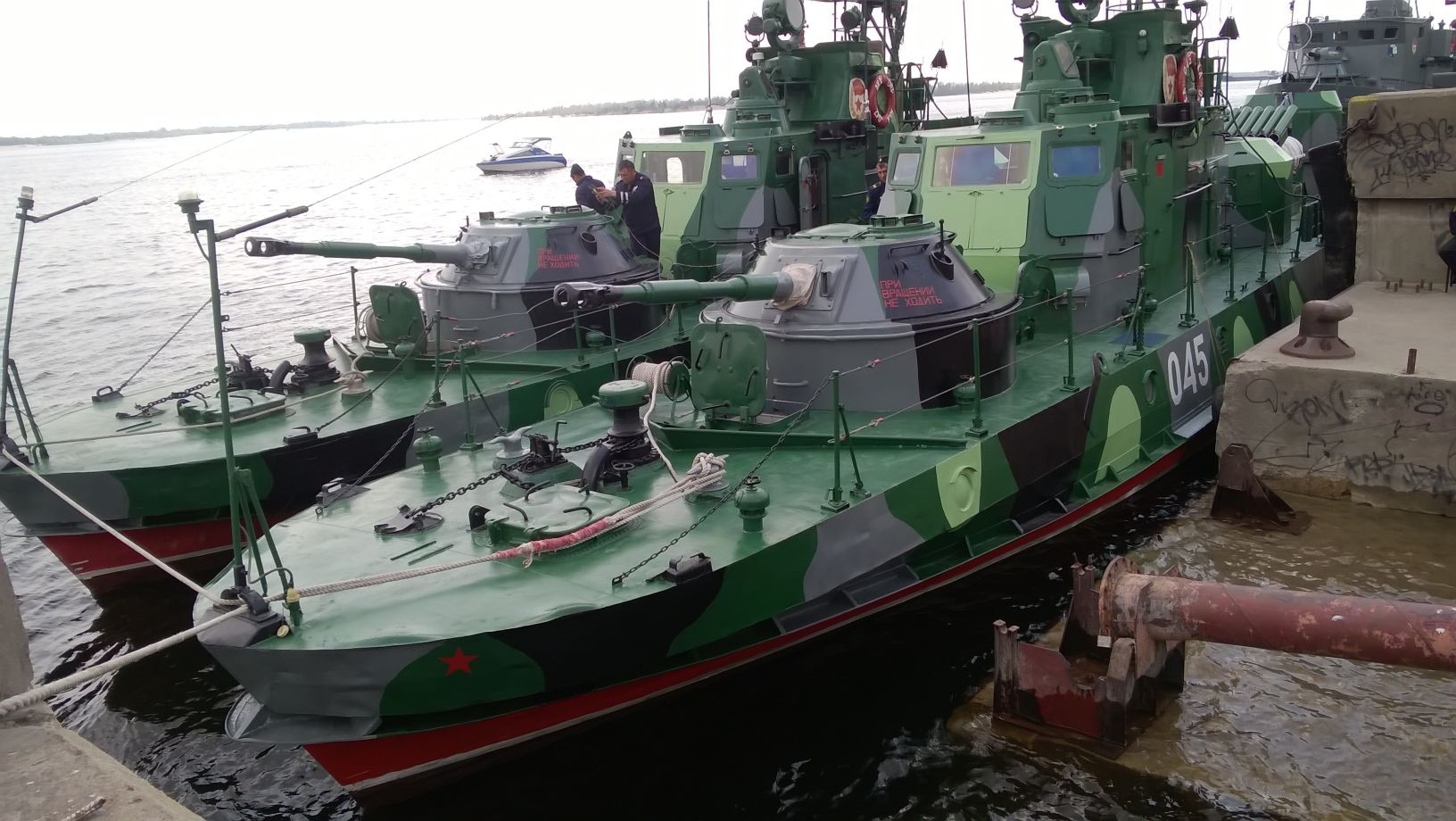
    Shmel-class gunboats
- Minesweepers
  - 2 Sonya-class minesweepers: German Ugryumov (former BT-244; active as of 2024) & Magomed Gadzhiev (former BT-116; active as of 2024);
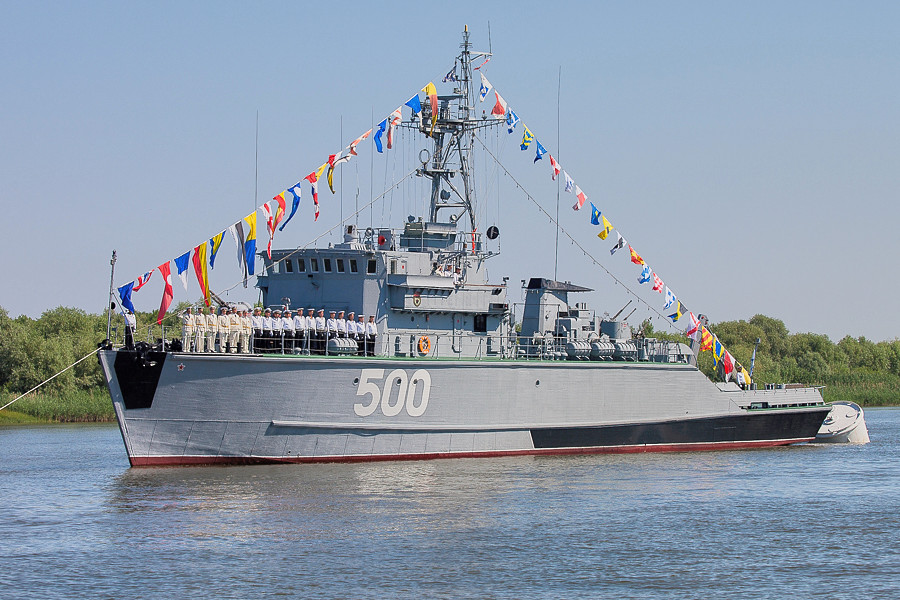
    German Ugryumov
  - 1 Lida-class minesweeper RT-234 (reported active as of 2021)
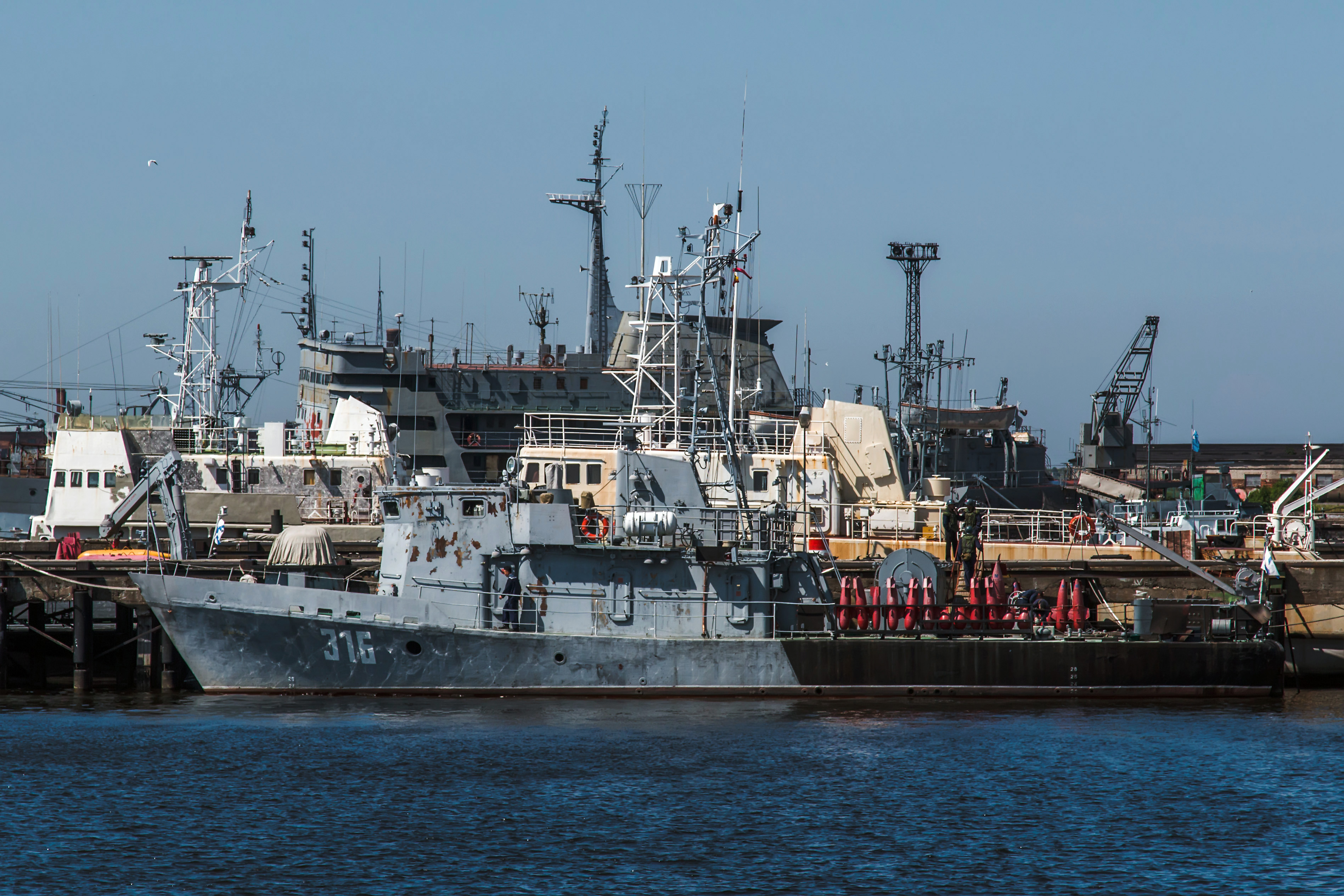
    RT-57
  - 1+? Yevgenya-class small minesweeper: RT-71 (active as of 2024) + others?
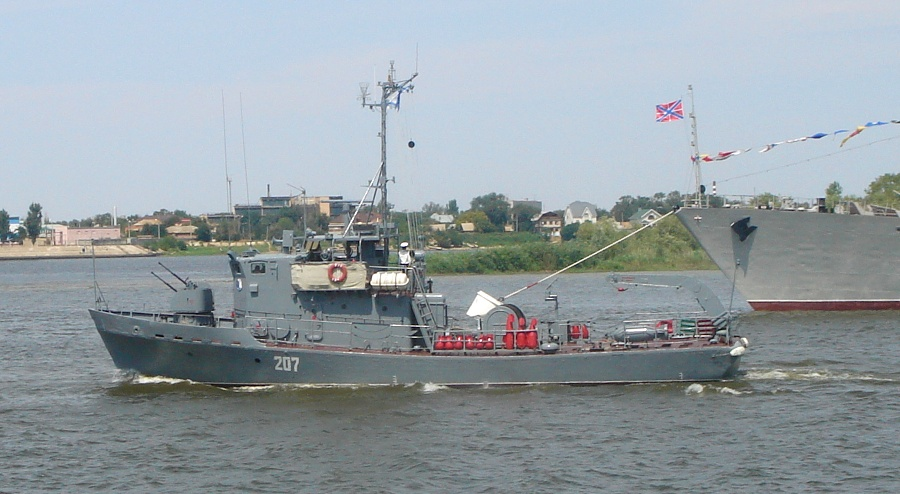
    RT-71
  - 2 Project 697TB minesweepers: RT-59 & RT-181
- Patrol boats
  - 3 Grachonok-class anti-saboteur ships: P-351 Yunarmeets Kaspiya, Yunarmeets Tatarstana & P-449 Yunarmeets Dagestana
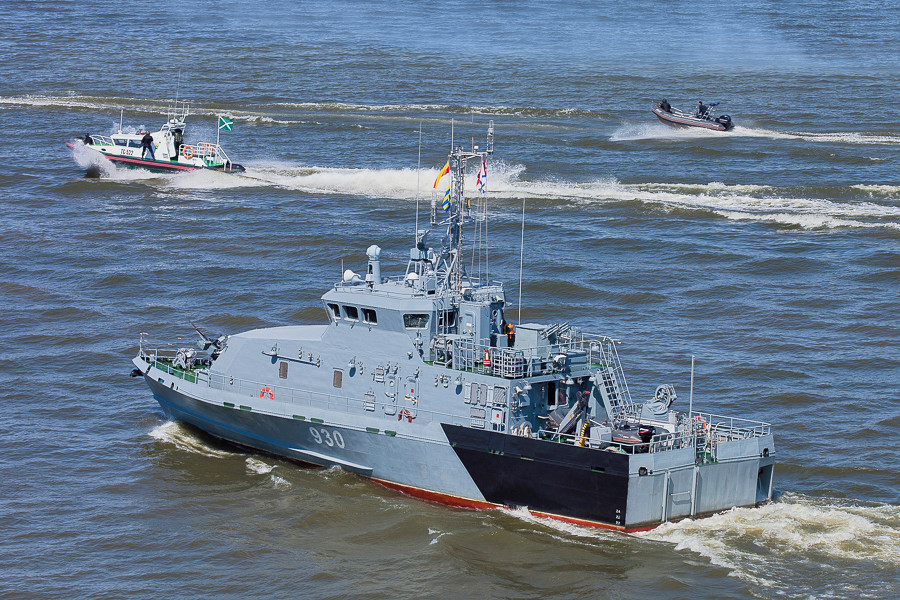
    P-351 Yunarmeets Kaspiya
  - 1 Raptor-class patrol boat (P-436)
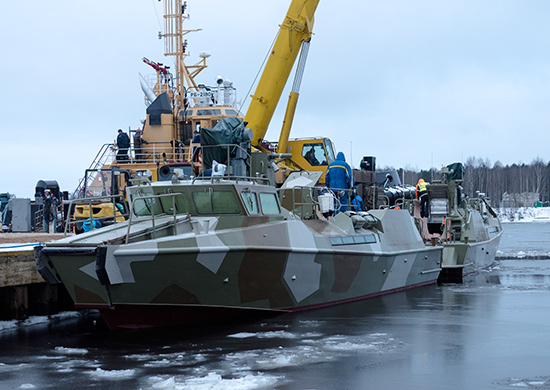
    Raptor-class vessel, P-434

Additional smaller Russian Coast Guard patrol boats, including up to 11 vessels of the Mangust class, are tasked to the Caspian Sea region, though some may have been transferred to the Black Sea. In total, as of 2025, the Russian Coast Guard was reported to deploy about 27 patrol vessels of various types in the Caspian Sea.

For a broader list of Russian navy patrol vessels see: List of active Russian Navy ships#Patrol boats. For a list of Russian coast guard patrol vessels see: Russian Coast Guard#Vessels in service

- Landing craft
  - 1 Dyugon-class landing craft (Ataman Platov)

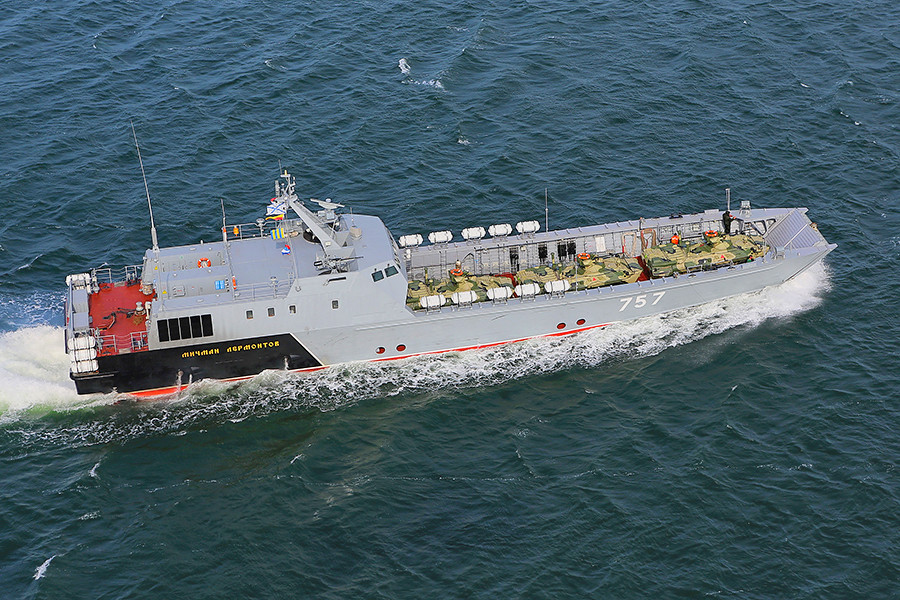
Dyugon-class landing craft

  - 1 Akula-class landing boat (D-185)
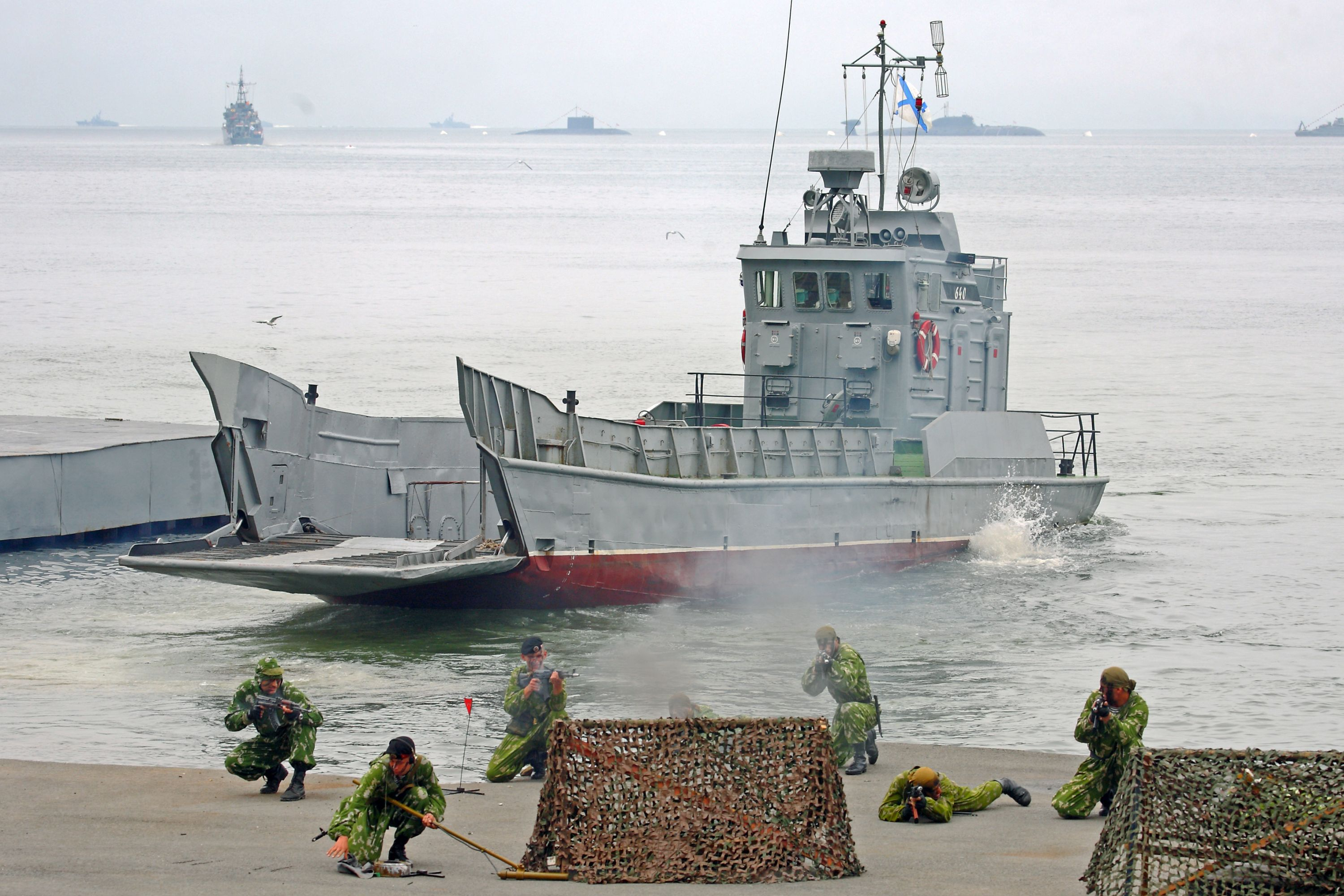
    Akula-class landing craft
  - 6 Serna-class landing craft (Alexey Sukhanov, D-131, D-156, D-172, D-178 Yury Kukushkin?, Zaur Omarov?)
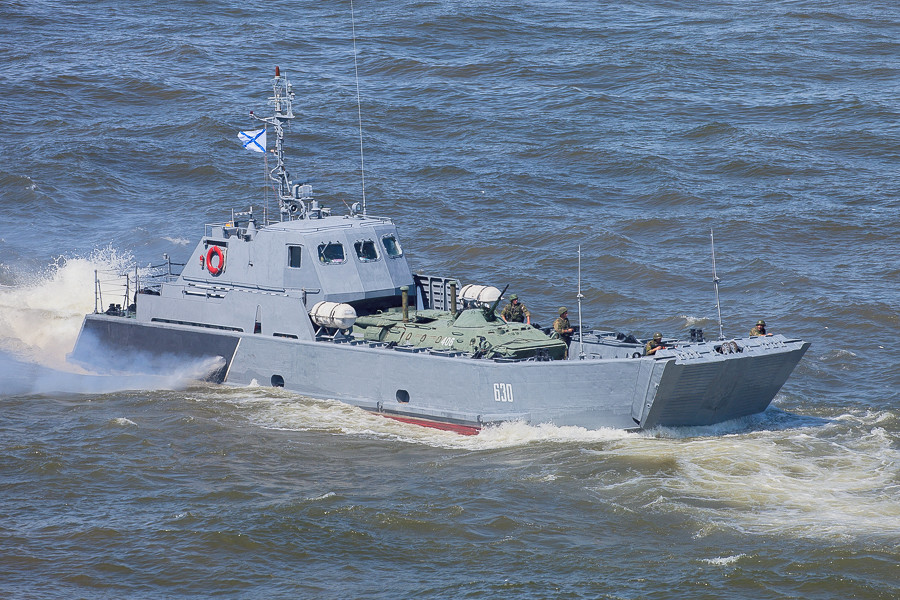
    Serna-class landing craft
- Auxiliaries

For a list of Russian navy auxiliaries, including those of the Caspian Flotilla, see: List of active Russian Navy ships#Auxiliaries

== Commanders ==
=== Soviet Union ===
Rank	Name	Year
	Fyodor Averichkin	1931-1932
	Gordey Levchenko	1932-1933
	Grigory Kireyev	1933-1934
Flagman 2nd Rank	Dmitry Isakov	1934-1938
Captain 2nd Rank	Vladmir Sumin	1938
	Arseny Golovko	1938-1939
Rear-Admiral	Fyodor Sedelnikov	1940-1944
Vice-Admiral	Fyodor Zozulya	1944-1946
Rear-Admiral	Nikolai Abramov	1946
Admiral	Stepan Kucherov	1946-1948
Rear-Admiral	Grigory Oleynik	1948-1951
Vice-Admiral	Georgy Kholostyakov	1951
Vice-Admiral	Aleksandr Kuzmin	1951-1954
Rear-Admiral	Serafim Chursin	1954-1955
Vice-Admiral	Grigory Oleynik	1955-1956
Vice-Admiral	Aleksandr Kuzmin	1956-1960
Vice-Admiral	Grigory Oleynik	1960-1967
Rear-Admiral	Georgy Chernobay	1967-1971
Rear-Admiral	Yaroslav Kudelkin	1971-1973
Rear-Admiral	Leonid Ryabtsev	1973-1977
Vice-Admiral	Hamid Gasimbayov	1977-1984
Rear-Admiral	Vasily Tolkachev	1984-1987
Vice-Admiral	Vladimir Lyashenko	1987-1991

=== Russia ===
Rank	Name	Year
Vice-Admiral	Boris Zinin	1991-1996
Vice-Admiral	Vladimir Masorin	1996-2002
Vice-Admiral	Yuri Startsev	2002-2005
Vice-Admiral	Viktor Kravchuk	2005-2009
Vice-Admiral	Sergei Alyokminsky	2010-2014
Captain 1st Rank	Ildar Akhmerov	2014-2015
Rear-Admiral	Igor Osipov	2015-2016
Vice-Admiral	Sergei Pinchuk	2016-2021
Vice-Admiral	Aleksandr Peshkov	2021-2024
Rear-Admiral	Oleg Zverev	2024-present
