= 2025 Kryvyi Rih playground strike =

2025 Russian missile strike on a playground in Kryvyi Rih, Ukraine

- Part of the Russo-Ukrainian war
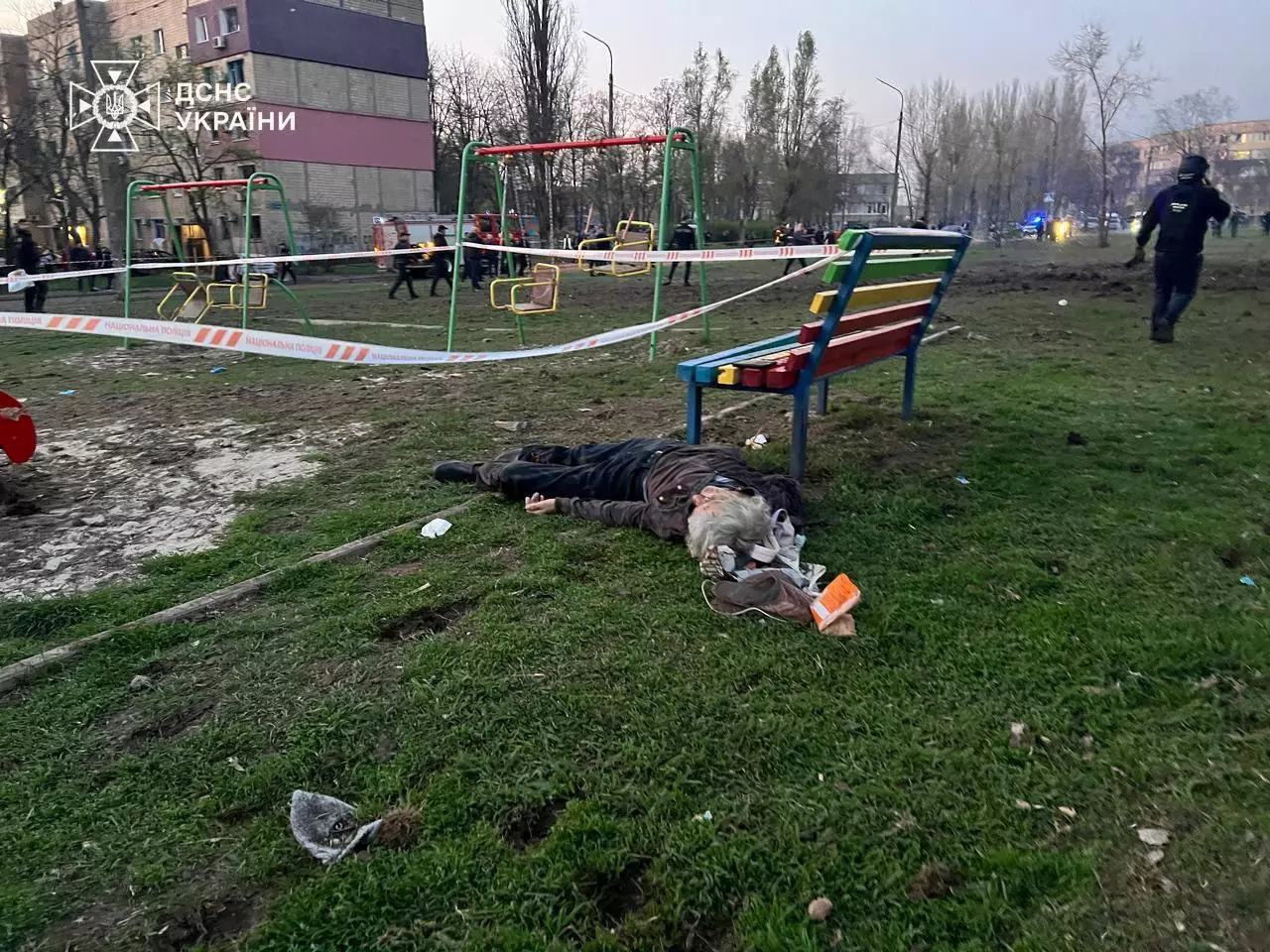
- Damage in Kryvyi Rih after the strike, 4 April 2025
- Location: Residential district near a children's playground, Kryvyi Rih, Dnipropetrovsk Oblast, Ukraine
- Date: 4 April 2025; 6:50 PM –
- Attack type: Ballistic missile strike
- Weapon: Iskander-M ballistic missile
- Deaths: 20
- Injuries: 72
- Perpetrator: Armed Forces of the Russian Federation
- Accused: Aleksey Kim, Aleksandr Peshkov, Aleksey Petrushyn, Aleksandr Kisedobrev
- Charges: War crimes (Art. 28(2) & 438(2), Criminal Code of Ukraine)
- Litigation: Named in a December 2025 US lawsuit against Intel, AMD, and Texas Instruments

On 4 April 2025, a Russian Iskander-M ballistic missile struck a residential area, including a children's playground in Kryvyi Rih, Ukraine. 20 people were killed, including 9 children. It was the deadliest single strike harming children since the start of the full-scale invasion.

== Attack ==
The ballistic missile exploded at 6:50PM over a residential area with a playground, a restaurant and multi-story buildings. Initial reports showed 19 dead, including 9 children. A 57 year old man died in the hospital on 6 April, bringing the total number killed to 20.

== Reactions ==
The UN The UN Security Council met on 8 April 2025 and condemned the attack. The Russian delegation denied the uses of cluster munitions.

== Investigation and war crimes charges ==
Investigators identified the missile as an Iskander 9M723 from the Votkinsk Machine Building Plant.

The SBU determined that the 1st Missile Brigade of the 49th Combined Arms Army launched the missile. They named Col. Gen. Aleksey Kim, Vice Admiral Alexander Peshkov, Rear Admiral Aleksey Petrushyn, and Col. Alexander Kisiedobriev as responsible. Ukraine charged the four men with war crimes under Part 2 of Article 28 and Part 2 of Article 438 of Ukraine's Criminal Code.

== Aftermath ==
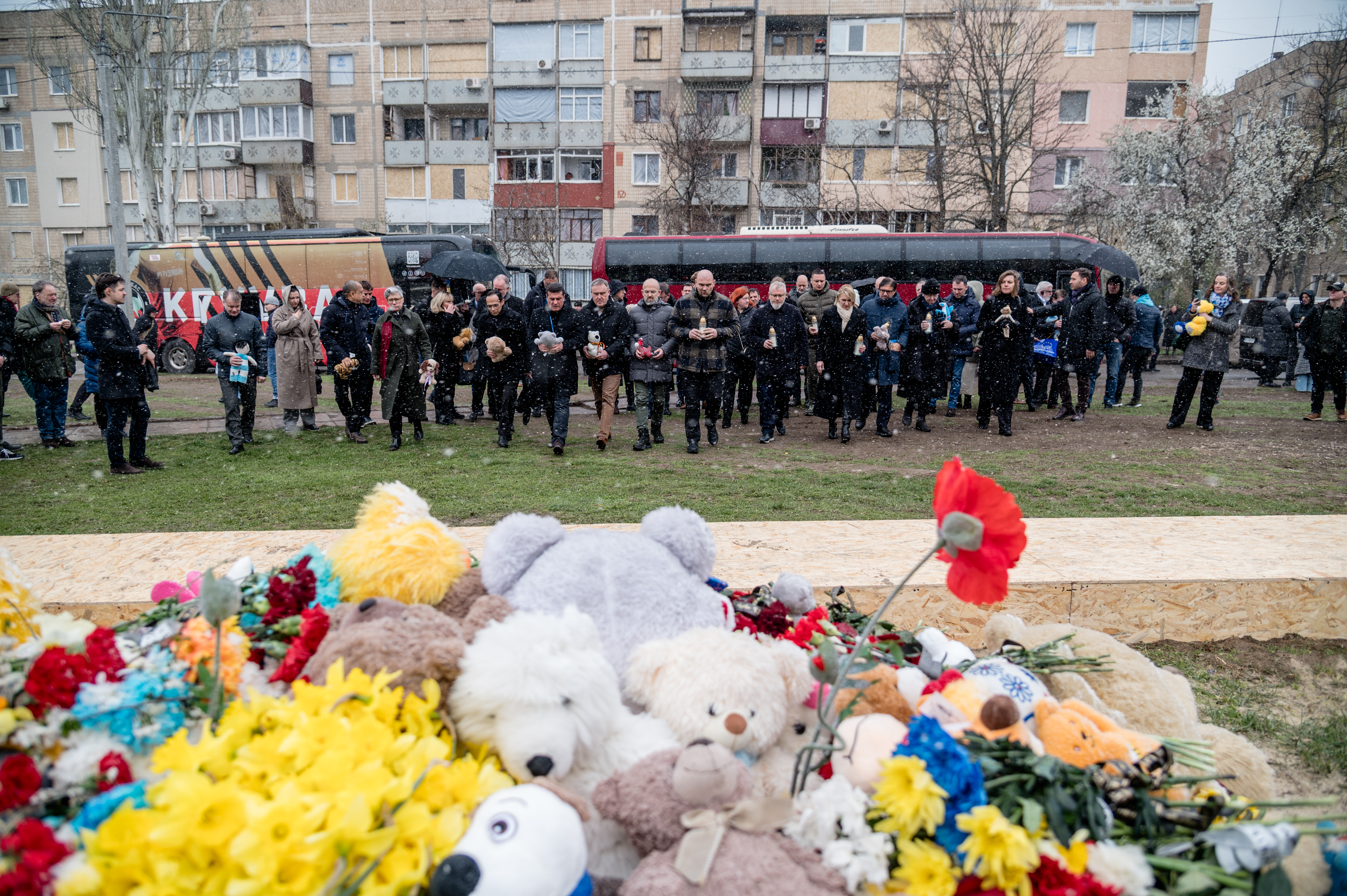
Foreign delegation visits Kryvyi Rih, Ukraine on April 9, 2025

A lawsuit was brought against Texas Instruments, Intel, AMD and Mouser Electronics in Texas, claiming the western components were found in the playground strike. Family members of the victims claimed the companies evaded US export laws and ignored government warnings to stop export to sanctioned actors in Russia and Iran.

== See also ==
- Kryvyi Rih strikes (2022–present)
- Russian invasion of Ukraine
- Iskander (missile)
- Russian attacks on civilians in the Russo-Ukrainian war (2022–present)
