= Fyodorovka, Fyodorov District =

Fyodorovka
- village
- Location within Kazakhstan
- Coordinates: 53°37′53″N 62°42′28″E
- Country: Kazakhstan
- Region: Kostanay Region
- District: Fyodorov District

Population (2019)
  - Total: 6,406
- Time zone: UTC+7

Fyodorovka (Kazakh: Фёдоров; Russian: Фёдоровка) is a village and the administrative center of the Fyodorov District of Kostanay Region in northern Kazakhstan.
