= Novoshumnoye =

Novoshumnoye Новошумное
- village
- Location within Kazakhstan
- Coordinates: 53°55′15″N 62°52′07″E
- Country: Kazakhstan
- Region: Kostanay Region
- District: Fyodorov District

Population (2009)
  - Total: 1,086
- Time zone: UTC+7

Novoshumnoye (Kazakh: Новошумное; Russian: Новошумное) is a village located in the Fyodorov District of Kostanay Region in northern Kazakhstan. Population: 1,086 (2009 census results).
