= Zver =

Zver is a Slovene surname. Notable people with the surname include:

- Billy Zver (born 1987), stage name of Macedonian rapper
- Mateja Zver (born 1988), Slovenian footballer
- Milan Zver (born 1962), Slovenian politician

== See also ==
- Zverev
