= Missile strike on the Black Sea Fleet headquarters =

Ukrainian military airstrike in Crimea

- Part of the Crimea attacks (2022–present)
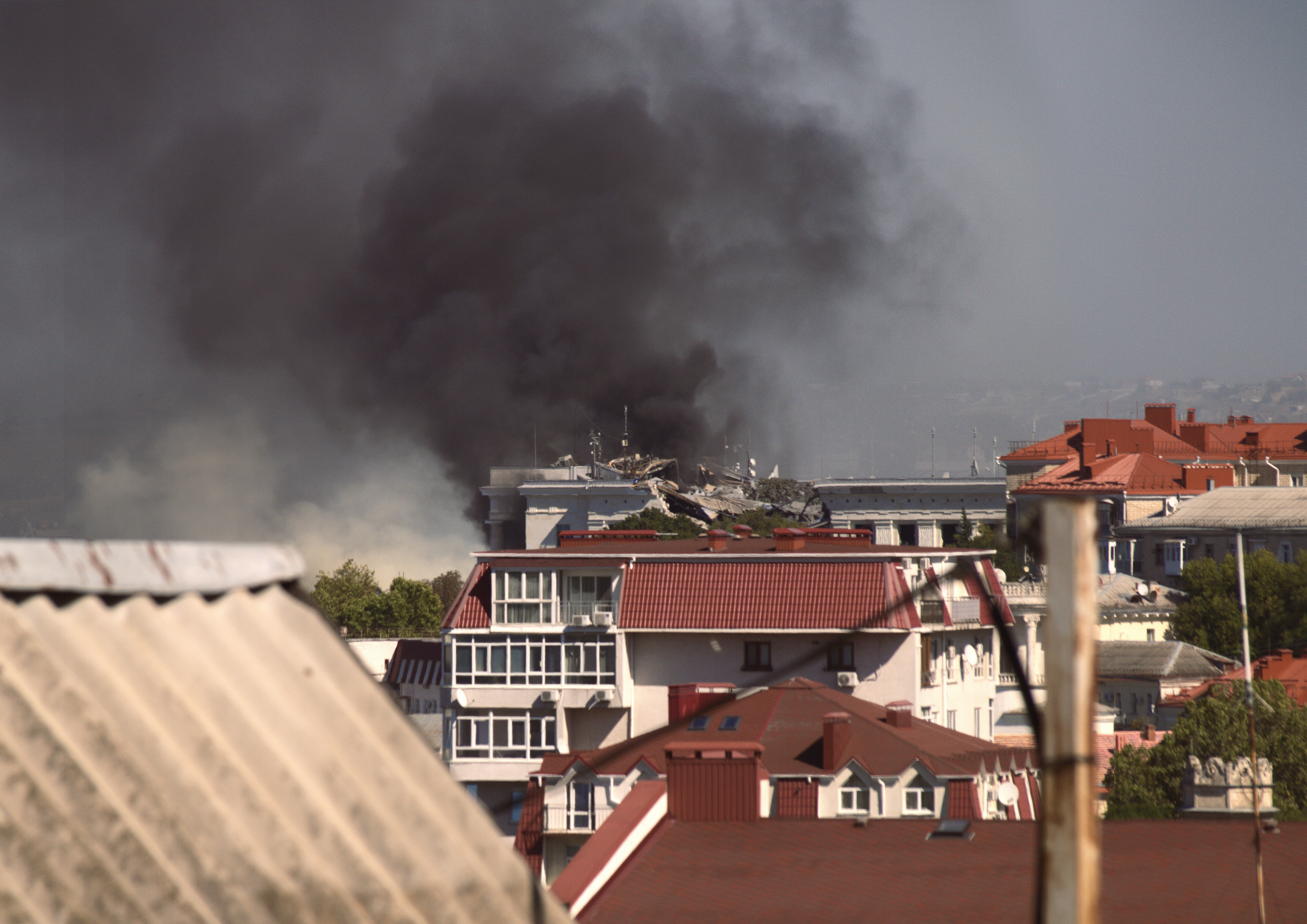
- Type: Missile strike
- Location: Sevastopol Naval Base, Crimea; 44°36′46″N 33°31′26″E
- Planned by: Ukraine
- Target: Black Sea Fleet
- Date: 22 September 2023
- Executed by: Armed Forces of Ukraine
- Casualties: Per Ukraine: 34 killed 105 injured Per Russia: 1 missing 6 injured

On 22 September 2023, headquarters of the Russian Black Sea Fleet at Sevastopol was attacked by Storm Shadow/SCALP cruise missiles launched by Su-24s of the Ukrainian Air Force. As a result, the headquarters building was partially destroyed. The strike was part of the war resulting from the ongoing Russian invasion of Ukraine, and was referred to as Operation Crab Trap (Ukrainian: Операція «Крабова пастка», romanized: Operatsiia "Krabova pastka") by Lieutenant General Kyrylo Budanov, the head of the Main Directorate of Intelligence (HUR).

== Background ==
Beginning in July 2022, a series of explosions and fires occurred on the Russian-occupied Crimean Peninsula from where the Russian Army had launched its offensive on Southern Ukraine during the Russian invasion of Ukraine. Occupied since 2014, Crimea was a base for the subsequent Russian occupation of Kherson Oblast and Russian occupation of Zaporizhzhia Oblast. The Ukrainian government has not accepted responsibility for all of the attacks, although it did later claim responsibility for the strike on the naval headquarters.

On 23 August, HUR released a video of a Russian S-400 surface-to-air missile system in Olenivka, Crimea, 120 kilometres (75 mi) south of Kherson, being struck by Ukrainian missiles, resulting in its total destruction and the deaths of several Russian military personnel in the vicinity. The loss of the S-400 system greatly depreciated Russia's ability to counteract Ukrainian missiles strikes in Crimea.

== Attack ==
At noon on 22 September 2023, two or more Storm Shadow/SCALP cruise missiles, supplied by France and/or the UK, struck the headquarters of the Russian Navy's Black Sea Fleet. The event was filmed and widely shared on social media, and confirmed by Russian installed governor Mikhail Razvozhayev. Local officials reported that the Ukrainian missile strike consisted of six missiles and that Russian air defense shot down five of them, but that one was able to hit the headquarters.

== Results of attack ==
=== According to Ukraine ===
Ukraine’s HUR Chief Kyrylo Budanov reported, in an interview with Voice of America the day after the attack, that the strike killed "at least nine people" and that 16 were injured, including high-ranking officers. He also reported that, "Among the wounded is the commander of the group [in the Zaporizhia direction], Colonel General Alexander Romanchuk, in very serious condition. The Chief of Staff, Lieutenant General Oleg Tsekov, is unconscious. The number of casual military servicemen who are not employees of the headquarters is still being determined." RFE/RL wrote that "Romanchuk commands frontline forces defending Russian-occupied parts of southeastern Ukraine's Zaporizhzhya region."

On 25 September, the Special Operations Forces Command of Ukraine's Armed Forces said that 34 Russian officers, including Sokolov, were killed and 105 soldiers injured in the attack.

=== According to Russia ===
Russian sources initially reported that only one soldier was unaccounted for, and nobody was injured. As videos of the strike circulated on Russian social media the following day, TASS increased the reported number of injured to six but reiterated that nobody was killed and that the situation was under control. Razvozhayev reported that the fire raging through the headquarters was contained as of 23 September.

Early reports circulated online that Admiral Viktor Sokolov, commander of the Black Sea Fleet, was killed in the strike, but such claims were denied by the Russian government, which showed video footage of Sokolov alive and well, although the time and date the video was filmed is unknown. The videos were later dated to prior to the attack, with the first being an awarding of soccer medals on 20 September and the second video references awarding of the 810th Guards Naval Infantry Brigade with the Medal of Ushakov, which publicly available information indicates happened on 29 August 2023. In February 2024, Viktor Sokolov was removed from his position as Commander of the Black Sea Fleet.

== See also ==
- 2023 Ukrainian counteroffensive
- History of Crimea
- Timeline of the Russian invasion of Ukraine (1 September – 30 November 2023)
