= Aleksandr Peshkov =

Russian naval officer (born 1972)

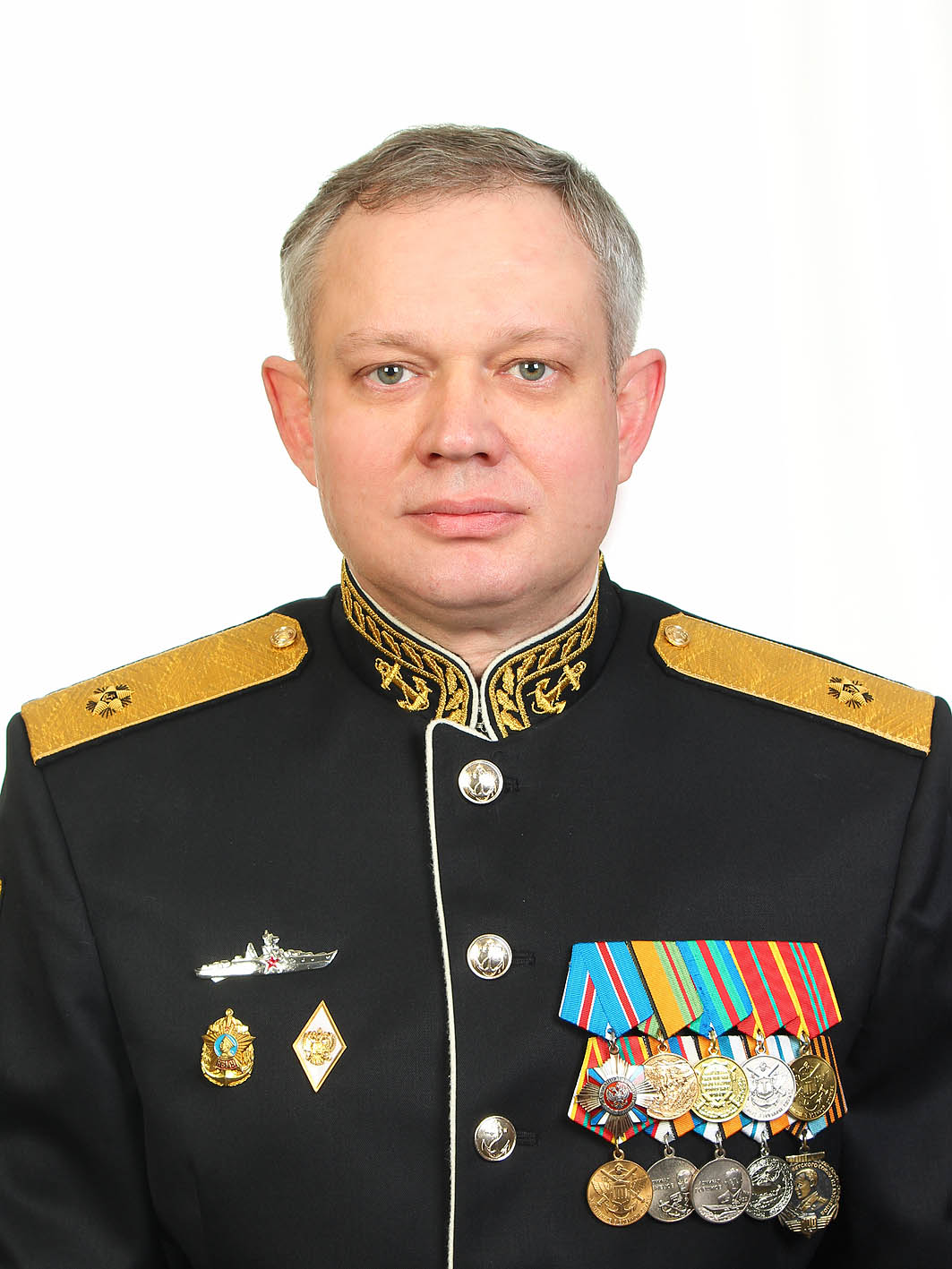
- Peshkov in 2018
- Born: 13 October 1972 (age 53); Murmansk, Russian SFSR, USSR
- Allegiance: USSR; Russia
- Branch: Soviet Navy; Russian Navy
- Service years: 1990–present
- Rank: Vice-Admiral
- Commands: Caspian Flotilla
- Awards: Order of Military Merit

Aleksandr Igorevich Peshkov (Russian: Александр Игоревич Пешков; born 13 October 1972) is an officer of the Russian Navy. He currently holds the rank of Vice-Admiral, and was commander in chief of the Caspian Flotilla between 2021 and 2024.

Intent on entering the Soviet Navy, Peshkov's education and training were only completed shortly after the dissolution of the Soviet Union in 1991. He nevertheless continued to serve with its successor force, the Russian Navy. A native of Murmansk, Peshkov initially served with the Northern Fleet on surface ships, primarily minesweepers. This began a long attachment to minesweeping forces, and after excellent results in training and exercises, he rose through the ranks to more responsible positions, and by 2001 was chief of staff and deputy commander of one of the fleet's minesweeping formations. After further studies at the Kuznetsov Naval Academy and the Military Academy of the General Staff Peshkov joined the Kola Flotilla of Mixed Forces.

In 2019, he left the Northern Fleet to take up a post with the Baltic Fleet, serving as commander of the Baltic Naval Base. Continuing to win plaudits for his service, in May 2021 he was appointed commander of the Caspian Flotilla.

Peshkov is wanted for war crimes in Ukraine for his involvement in the 2025 Kryvyi Rih playground strike.

== Family and early career ==
Peshkov was born on 13 October 1972 in Murmansk, then part of the Russian SFSR, in the USSR. His family was not directly connected with the navy, but had experience of maritime matters. His mother was born in Polyarny, during its period as the main base of the Northern Fleet, before moving to Murmansk and becoming a senior nurse in the cardiac intensive care unit of the Murmansk regional hospital. His father served in the Soviet merchant fleet as a sailor and later as a foreman of the deck crew. He did have a relative who served on the destroyers of the Baltic Fleet, and decided at an early age that he wanted to serve on large surface ships. In 1987, at the age of 14, he enrolled at the Leningrad Nakhimov Naval School.

After completing his studies at the naval school, Peshkov joined the M. V. Frunze Higher Naval School in Leningrad in 1990, graduating from the faculty of mine and torpedo warfare as a lieutenant in 1994. He then joined the Northern Fleet at Polyarny, initially commanding the weapons department on board ships. He rose rapidly in the service, within six months he was appointed assistant commander of the ship, and in 1997, by now a senior lieutenant, he was given command of the minesweeper Yelnya, which he commanded until 2001. He was promoted to the rank of captain 3rd rank ahead of schedule after good results in exercises, and in 2001 took part in the operations to raise the sunken submarine Kursk and bring her into port. Having achieved this task, Peshhkov was appointed chief of staff and deputy commander of one of the fleet's minesweeper divisions.

== Northern Fleet minesweeping commands ==
In 2002, Peshkov entered the Kuznetsov Naval Academy, graduating with honours in 2004 and returning to Northern Fleet as chief of staff and deputy commander of a minesweeper formation, and later becoming the formation's commander. His appointment made him one of the youngest brigade commanders in the fleet. Over his time with the formation, he continued to take part in fleet exercises, including the Ladoga-2009 exercise. The minesweeper formation was repeatedly declared the best in the fleet's Kola Flotilla of Mixed Forces, and on 9 May 2009 Peshkov was presented with the Order of Military Merit by the commander of the Northern Fleet, Vice-Admiral Nikolai Maksimov. Peshkov credited the award primarily to the entire brigade and its sailors for their hard work.

Video of ships of the Northern Fleet carrying out exercises in 2017, during Peshkov's time with the Kola Flotilla of Mixed Forces

In 2012, Peshkov graduated from the Military Academy of the General Staff and was briefly appointed chief of staff and deputy commander of the Northern Fleet's missile ship division, before later that year becoming deputy commander of the fleet's Kola Flotilla of Mixed Forces. The period was one of increased activity and responsibility for the fleet and flotilla's forces. In November 2014, a taskforce consisting of the Udaloy-class destroyer Severomorsk, the Ropucha-class landing ship Aleksandr Otrakovsky, the rescue tug SB-406 and the replenishment oiler Dubna, sailed from Severomorsk for exercises, before carrying out a cruise in the North-East Atlantic. Peshkov stated that "the main goal is to ensure the naval presence of our country in the operationally important regions of the World Ocean, as well as to ensure the safety of maritime navigation and other types of maritime economic activities of Russia."

== Baltic Fleet and Caspian Flotilla ==
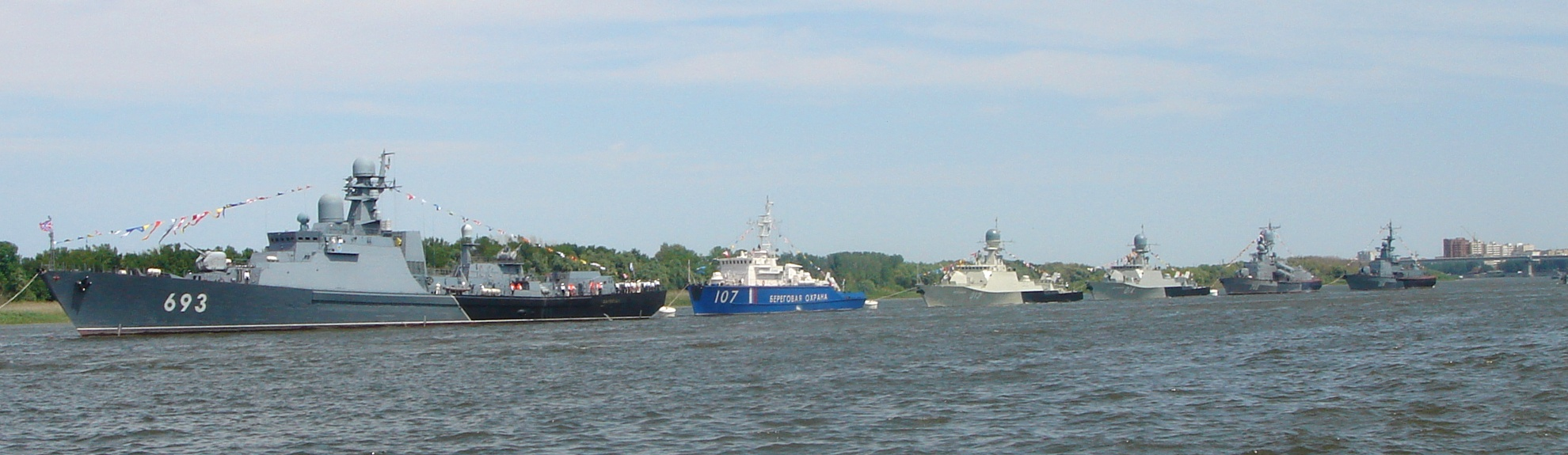
Ships of the Caspian Flotilla in 2012. Peshkov took command of the flotilla in May 2021.

In January 2019, Peshkov was appointed commander of the Baltic Naval Base, serving under Baltic Fleet commander Admiral Aleksandr Nosatov. Among the tasks taking place at the base during his time in charge was the deployment of minesweepers to detect and make safe old naval mines. On 13 October 2020, Peshkov welcomed the Alexandrit-class minesweeper Aleksandr Obukhov back into port at Baltiysk. The Aleksandr Obukhov had been sweeping the waters outside the base, and had discovered 12 galvanic contact anchor mines dating from the Second World War, which were neutralized by detonation. The Baltic Naval Base was recognized as one of the fleet's best formations for 2020, having carried out a large number of successful cruises and exercises.

In May 2021, Peshkov was appointed commander of the Caspian Flotilla, succeeding Vice-Admiral Sergei Pinchuk, who had been appointed deputy commander of the Black Sea Fleet. One of his first duties was to participate in the events surrounding that year's Victory Day celebrations and the Victory Day parade in Kaspiysk. He stepped down as commander in July 2024, having been promoted to vice-admiral on 6 December 2023.

== Legal issues ==
For Peshkov's involvement in the 2025 Kryvyi Rih playground strike, he was charged in absentia for war crimes under Part 2 of Article 28 and Part 2 of Article 438 of Ukraine's Criminal Code.

Military offices
Preceded by Sergei Pinchuk	Commander of the Caspian Flotilla; 2021–2024	Succeeded by Oleg Zverev
