= Oleg Zverev =

Russian naval officer

Oleg Yuryevich Zverev
- Born: 7 May 1967 (age 59); Moldino, Udomelsky District, Kalinin Oblast, Russian SFSR, USSR
- Allegiance: Soviet Union; Russia
- Branch: Soviet Navy; Russian Navy
- Rank: Rear-Admiral
- Commands: Caspian Flotilla
- Awards: Order of Alexander Nevsky; Order of Courage; Order of Naval Merit; Order "For Merit to the Fatherland" Second Class

Oleg Yuryevich Zverev (Russian: Олег Юрьевич Зверев; born 7 May 1967) is an officer of the Russian Navy. He currently holds the rank of Rear-Admiral, and has been commander in chief of the Caspian Flotilla since 2024.

== Biography ==
Zverev was born on 7 May 1967, in the village of Moldino, Udomelsky District, in what was then Kalinin Oblast, Russian Soviet Federal Socialist Republic, in the Soviet Union. In 1991 he graduated from the Higher Naval School of Submarine Navigation and went on to serve onboard submarines of the Northern Fleet. He graduated from the Higher Special Officer Classes of the Navy in 1999 and between 8 October 2002 and 29 February 2008 he was commander of the Akula-class submarine Volk. He graduated from the Kuznetsov Naval Academy in 2010, spent two years as head of the submarine training centre in Obninsk, and then more than five years as head of the Northern Fleet's combat training department.

In 2020, Zverev graduated from the Military Academy of the General Staff and was appointed commander of the White Sea Naval Base. He held this position until May 2024, when he was, by Decree of the President of Russia, appointed to command the Caspian Flotilla.

== Awards and honours ==
Over his career Zverev has been awarded the Order of Alexander Nevsky, the Order of Courage, the Order of Naval Merit, the Order "For Merit to the Fatherland" Second Class, and various departmental medals.

== Personal life ==
Zverev is married and has two daughters.

Military offices
Preceded by Aleksandr Peshkov	Commander of the Caspian Flotilla; 2024–	Succeeded by Incumbent
