= Hamid Gasimbayov =

Soviet military personnel (1923–2005)

- Azerbaijani: Həmid Həbib bəy oğlu Qasımbəyov
- Born: May 13, 1923; Nakhchivan, Nakhichevan ASSR, Azerbaijan SSR, Soviet Union
- Died: April 22, 2005 (aged 81); Baku, Azerbaijan
- Spouse: Tatyana Sidorova
- Military career
- Service years: 1945–1984
- Rank: Vice admiral
- Unit: Navy
- Conflicts: World War II; Soviet–Japanese War
- Awards: Order of the Patriotic War; Order of the Red Banner of Labour; Order of the Red Star; Order of the Red Star; Medal "For Battle Merit"; Jubilee Medal "In Commemoration of the 100th Anniversary of the Birth of Vladimir Ilyich Lenin"; Medal "For the Defence of the Caucasus"; Medal "For the Victory over Germany in the Great Patriotic War 1941–1945"; Medal "For the Victory over Japan"; Medal "Veteran of the Armed Forces of the USSR"

Hamid Habib bay oglu Gasimbayov (13 May 1923, Nakhchivan – 22 April 2005, Baku) was a Soviet military officer, vice admiral.

In 1945, he participated in military operations against Japan. He was awarded the Order of the Red Star for his service with minesweeper No. 604 under heavy artillery fire and attack by Japanese aircraft.

In 1957, he was appointed commander of the military defence brigade of the Soviet Navy in Świnoujście, Poland. In 1970, he was appointed Chief of the General Military Staff of the Baltic Sea Navy.

He received the rank of rear admiral in 1971 and vice admiral in 1976.

From 1980 to 1984, he was elected as a deputy in the 10th convocation of the Supreme Soviet of the Azerbaijan SSR.

He was awarded with two Orders of the Red Star, an Order of the Red Banner of Labour, and about 30 orders and medals. In 1973, he was awarded an honorary weapon – a sword by the commander of the USSR Navy.

== Life ==
Hamid Gasimbayov was born on May 3, 1923, in Nakhchivan. At a young age, his family moved to the city of Ganja, where he began to study at school No. 3 in the Nizami district. After ten years of school, he entered the faculty of railway construction at the Moscow Institute of Transport. After the start of World War II, he worked as a blacksmith in a non-ferrous metals factory alongside his studies. In the fall of 1941, the institute was moved from Moscow to Tbilisi due to the German threat.

== Military service ==
=== In World War II ===
At the end of December 1941 Hamid Gasimbayov entered the Caspian Sea Higher Naval School. After graduating in February 1945, Lieutenant Gasimbayov was sent to serve in the Black Sea Fleet.

At the beginning of May 1945 he was sent to the Pacific Fleet in Vladivostok as part of the team. He joined the commission established to receive new ships manufactured in the United States and sent to support the USSR. Here, after completing the task, the navigator was assigned to the minesweeper. He participated in military operations against Japan in August–September 1945. He served on minesweepers ships serving in the defense of South Sakhalin and Kuril Islands. He participated in the anti-mine defense of Port Arthur of the Kuril Islands and in mine clearance operations in the Seas of Okhotsk and Japan, as well as in the Laperuz and Tatar Straits. Gasimbayov, who served as navigator on minesweeper No. 604, was awarded with the Order of the Red Star for his service under heavy artillery fire and attack by Japanese aircraft.

=== In later period ===
At the beginning of 1948 Lieutenant Gasimbayov was appointed the commander of the "МТЩ-602" fortification ship, and from the spring of 1949, 5 detachments of US-made landing ships and boats. In 1949, Hamid Gasimbayov was appointed as the commander of the fortification rodent division of the naval base belonging to the Baltic Sea Fleet. In 1957, he was appointed as a commander of the military defense brigade of the Soviet Navy in Świnoujście, Poland.

In 1963 he was appointed as a commander of the 71st amphibious brigade of the Baltic Sea Navy, which is the most powerful and strategically important of the former USSR Minister of Defence. In 1970, by special order of the USSR Navy Command, Hamid Gasimbayov was promoted to the position of Chief of the General Staff of the Baltic Sea Navy. In 1971, he was given the high military rank of rear admiral. From 1973 to 1977, he served as the garrison chief of the Baltic Sea Navy.

By the order of the Supreme Assembly of the USSR on March 4, 1975, Rear Admiral Gasimbayov was awarded with the "Red Banner of Labour" order. In 1976, he was awarded with the rank of vice admiral. In 1977, he was appointed as the commander of the Caspian Sea Navy. He was discharged from the army in 1984 due to his health.

He was elected as a deputy at the 10th convocation of the Supreme Soviet of the Azerbaijan SSR.

Along with the medals of foreign countries such as Poland and Germany, he was awarded about 30 medals and orders. In 1973 he was awarded an honorary weapon – a sword by the commander of the USSR naval forces.

== Family ==
His father, Habib Gasimbayov, started working in road construction after graduating from the military school in Gori. He participated in the First World War. After returning from the front, he married Nina Dushinskaya and moved to Baku. He served in the border service during the Azerbaijan Democratic Republic.

Hamid Gasimbayov married Tatyana Sidorova. They had two daughters and one son from this marriage.

== Death ==
He died in 2005 as a result of a long-lasting illness. He was buried in the Second Alley of Honor.

== Memory ==
On April 18, 2018, the deputies of the Baltiysk city Duma of the Kaliningrad region of the Russian Federation adopted a decision to perpetuate the name of Hamid Habib oglu Gasimbayov. A memorial plaque of the legendary admiral has been placed in front of building No. 11 on Lenin Street in the city.
