= Zhizdrinsky Uyezd =

Subdivision of the Russian Empire

Zhizdrinsky Uyezd (Жи́здринский уе́зд) was one of the subdivisions of the Kaluga Governorate of the Russian Empire. It was situated in the southwestern part of the governorate. Its administrative centre was Zhizdra.

== Demographics ==
At the time of the Russian Empire Census of 1897, Zhizdrinsky Uyezd had a population of 240,347. Of these, 99.5% spoke Russian, 0.3% Belarusian, 0.1% Yiddish, 0.1% Latvian and 0.1% Polish as their native language.
