= Fyodorov District =

Coordinates: 53°37′53″N 62°42′28″E

Fyodorov
- District
- Фёдоров ауданы
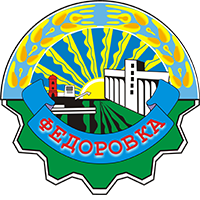
- Coat of arms

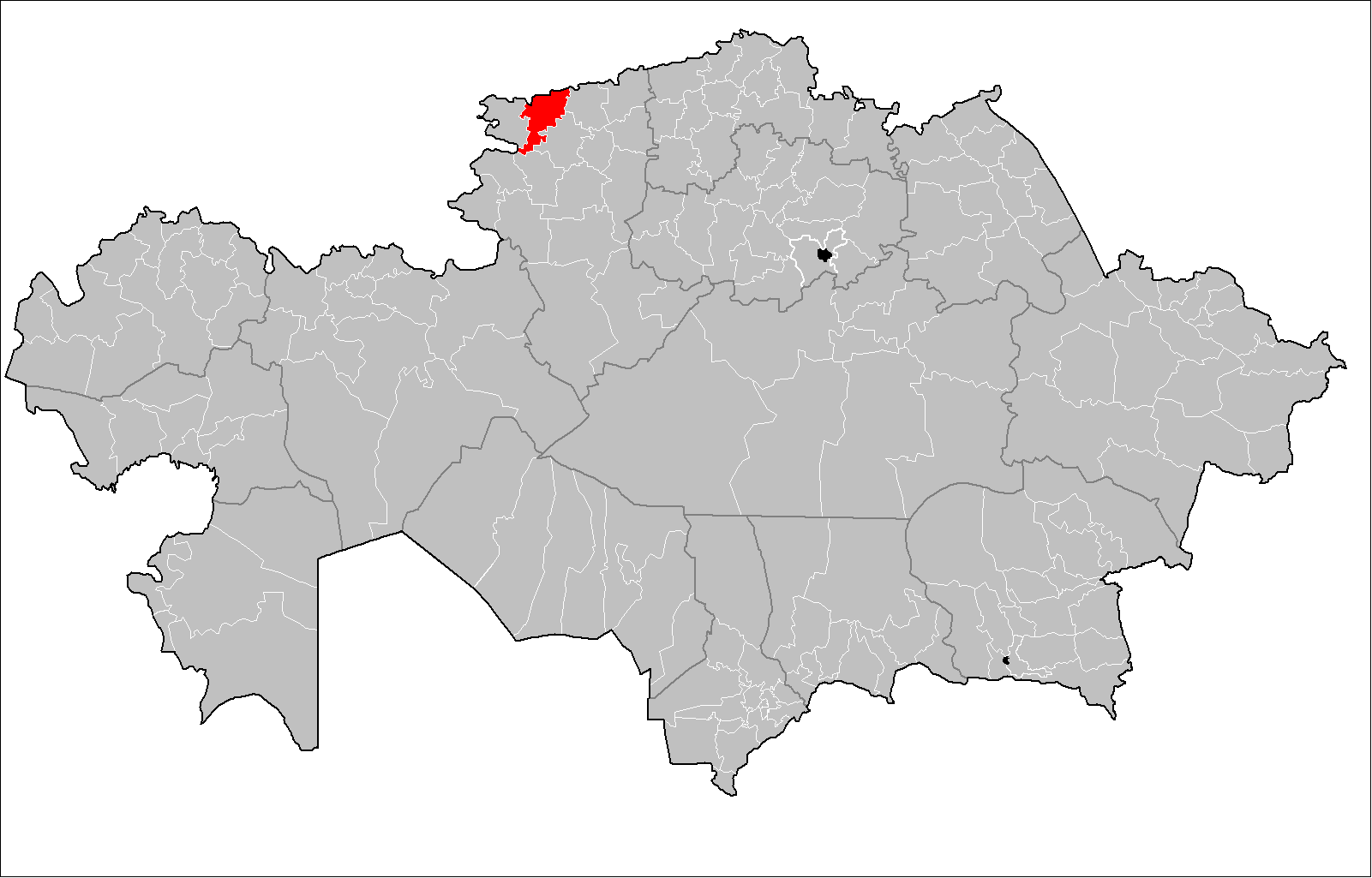
- Country: Kazakhstan
- Region: Kostanay Region
- Administrative center: Fyodorovka
- Established: 1928

Government
  - Akim: Tauba Isabaev

Population (2013)
  - Total: 27,389
- Time zone: UTC+6 (East)
- Website: http://fedorovka.kostanay.gov.kz

Fyodorov (Kazakh: Фёдоров ауданы, Fiodorov audany; Russian: Фёдоровский район, Fyodorovsky rayon) is a district of Kostanay Region in northern Kazakhstan. The administrative center of the district is the selo of Fyodorovka. Population: 27,389 (2013 estimate); 28,348 (2009 census results); 37,973 (1999 census results).
