= Mikhail Zvinchuk =

Russian military blogger (born 1991)

- Михаил Звинчук
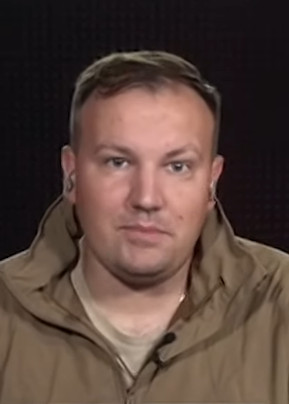
- Zvinchuk in 2024
- Born: July 19, 1991 (age 35); Vladivostok, Russian SFSR, USSR
- Other name: Rybar
- Occupation: Milblogger
- Years active: 2001–present

Mikhail Sergeevich Zvinchuk (Russian: Михаил Сергеевич Звинчук; born 1991) is a Russian milblogger and author of the Russian Telegram channel Rybar (Russian: Рыбарь, lit. 'fisherman'), which has over 1.3 million subscribers. Until 2019, he worked in the press service of the Russian Ministry of Defense. Each Zvinchuk report is read by an average of 600,000 people.

== Early life and education ==
Zvinchuk was born in Vladivostok. From the age of 14, he studied at the Suvorov Military School in Moscow. He graduated from the Military University of the Ministry of Defense of the Russian Federation as a military interpreter in Arabic and English.

== Career ==
After graduation, he served in the Spetsnaz GRU and was the commander of a reconnaissance group.

During the Russian military intervention in the Syrian civil war, he worked in the press service of the Russian Ministry of Defense and based on that, in 2018, he was included in the Ukrainian Myrotvorets list of "enemies of Ukraine" as "an accomplice in information and propaganda campaigns and manipulations of the Russian Ministry of Defense to justify Russian aggression against Ukraine and massacres of civilians in Syria". In 2019, he retired from the military.

On December 20, 2022, by order of Vladimir Putin, Zvinchuk was included in the working group for mobilization.

On 9 October 2026, Mikhail Zvinchuk was arrested, along with his wife Zvinchuk and three other people, by Montenegrin police and Agency for National Security officers. The detainees were deported from Montenegro shortly thereafter; the authorities ordered their deportation on grounds of “national and internal security.”

== Rybar Telegram channel ==
The Rybar channel on Telegram was created by Zvinchuk and Denis Shchukin, a Moscow-based programmer. The creators remained anonymous until their identities were revealed by Bell journalists in November 2022. According to The Bell, initially the channel was independent, but at some point Zvinchuk began to cooperate with Yevgeny Prigozhin's Internet Research Agency. In the course of cooperation, Prigozhin allocated funding to the Telegram channel, and a permanent section of the channel was published on the Internet Research Agency's website from June 2020 to August 2021. The collaboration ended in 2021 or 2022.

In an interview with RTVI in 2022, Zvinchuk stated that about 40 permanent employees are working on the channel, and the monthly budget is 4 million rubles. According to Zvinchuk, the channel is funded by donations. The channel published criticism of the actions of the Russian Ministry of Defense during the invasion of Ukraine. In October 2022, the Telegram channel Mash reported that Valery Gerasimov, Chief of the General Staff of the Armed Forces of the Russian Federation, asked Roskomnadzor to check the channel for "fake" news and "discrediting" of the Russian army. At the same time, according to The Bell, three days before the announcement of the check, the channel published three messages advertising the mobilization. In 2024, Zvinchuk also reported on the 2024 Syrian opposition offensives, which placed the Russian Khmeimim Air Base and Tartus naval base in the country at risk of being captured by rebels.

== Sanctions ==
On January 15, 2023, Zvinchuk was included in the sanctions list of Ukraine because he "propagates war, spreads disinformation and supports the Putin regime."

On June 23, 2023, Zvinchuk was included in the sanctions list of all EU countries for supporting actions that undermine and threaten the territorial integrity, sovereignty and independence of Ukraine.

== Awards ==
- Order "For fidelity to duty" (Russian: За верность долгу), Republic of Crimea, June 8, 2023 - for a significant personal contribution to the development of journalism in the Republic of Crimea, initiative and dedication shown in the performance of civic duty, and in connection with the Day of Russia
- Medal of the Order "For Merit to the Fatherland" (Russian: Медаль ордена «За заслуги перед Отечеством») second class, 16 November 2023
